= Human rights in Algeria =

In 2011, the then Algerian president Abdelaziz Bouteflika lifted a state of emergency that had been in place since the end of the Algerian Civil War in 2002, as a result of the Arab Spring protests that had occurred throughout the Arab world.

Serious challenges to human rights in Algeria have included torture, arbitrary arrest and detention, serious restrictions on free expression and media, overly restrictive laws on the organization, funding, or operation of NGOs, restrictions of religious freedom, serious government corruption, people trafficking, significant restrictions on workers' freedom of association and child labor. In 2017, Human Rights Watch reported the Algerian government had increasingly resorted to criminal prosecutions against bloggers, journalists, and media figures for peaceful speech, via articles in the country's penal code criminalising "offending the president", "insulting state officials" and "denigrating Islam", in addition to dismissing peaceful demonstrations as "unauthorised gatherings".

Bouteflika resigned in 2019 after months of protests following the declaration of his intention to run for a fifth term as president. Following an interim period, Abdelmadjid Tebboune was elected president, who spoke out in favour of protestors. Despite this, Human Rights Watch reported in 2021 that the Algerian government continued to arrest and imprison protestors, activists, and journalists from the Hirak movement, alongside amending the country's constitution to restrict freedom of speech and further curtail judicial independence.

== Historical background ==
Algeria has been categorized by Freedom House as "not free" since it began publishing such ratings in 1972, with the exception of 1989, 1990, and 1991, when the country was labeled "partly free". To the extent that there is democracy in today's Algeria, it is founded in three pieces of legislation:

- The Political Parties Act (1989, amended 1997), which allowed multiple political parties
- The Associations Act (1987, amended 1990), which permitted establishment of associations
- The Information Act (1990), which paved the way for independent news media

Free elections were held in the country beginning in 1988, but a victory by the Islamic Salvation Front (FIS) in the 1991 parliamentary ballot sparked a military coup d'état and the imposition, in February 1992, of a state of emergency under which basic human rights were suspended. Freedom of expression, association, and assembly were severely restricted, and many individuals were arrested without charge and held without trial. A civil war raged from 1991 to 1999, and since its end there have been no proper official investigations into the massive human-rights violations that took place during the conflict.

The government's main opponent in the war was the Armed Islamic Group (GIA), an Islamic terrorist organization and Al Qaeda affiliate that was described by John R. Schindler in The National Interest in July 2012 as "supremely violent" and as the perpetrator of "a wave of bombings in Paris in the summer of 1995" that were "Al Qaeda's first attacks on the West". Schindler notes that "Algeria's nightmare years of 1993–1997 were a focus of the international human-rights community" but that "the terrible fratricide [of] the 1990s got little coverage in Western media, despite the fact that it probably claimed twice as many lives as the Bosnian conflict, which ran concurrently and received nonstop Western attention." Schindler added that "Algeria's bloody civil war, which began twenty years ago, never really ended."

December 2010 marked the beginning of a period of frequent and nationwide protests inspired by the so-called "Arab Spring" and sparked by widespread anger over high unemployment, a serious housing shortage, high food prices, extensive corruption, and severe restrictions on freedom of expression and other human rights.

The National Coordination Committee for Change and Democracy (CNCD) is an umbrella group of opposition parties, unions, and human-rights groups that was formed in January 2011 in the wake of the violent suppression of protests in which several people were killed and hundreds injured or arrested.

The CNCD planned a march in Algiers on January 21, 2011, to demand an end to the state of emergency and a restoration of democracy and freedom. The government sought to prevent the demonstration by blocking roads to Algiers, stopping trains to Algiers, setting up checkpoints and barricades within Algiers, refusing visas to representatives of the international media, detaining government opponents and journalists, and shutting down the Internet. Still, the protest went on, with authorities estimating the number of participants at 800 and the organizers estimating the number at 2000. Many protesters were beaten and cameras confiscated.

The state of emergency was lifted in February 2011, but extensive restrictions on human rights remain.

In April 2019, president Abdelaziz Bouteflika, who had been in the role since 1999, resigned following mass protests after he announced his intention to run for a fifth term. Bouteflika was succeeded by Abdelmadjid Tebboune, who spoke in favour in the protestors.

During the 2020 COVID-19 pandemic in Algeria, public health was used by the government to justify the dispersion of ongoing Hirak protests by implementing a lockdown. When the lockdown was lifted in June 2020, protests in major Algerian cities were subsequently repressed, leading to riots in Béjaïa.

The following chart shows Algeria's ratings since 1972 in the Freedom in the World reports, published annually by Freedom House. A rating of 1 is "free"; 7, "not free".^{1}

Historical ratings

Year	Political Rights	Civil Liberties	Status	President^{2}
1972	6	6	Not Free	Houari Boumediene
1973	6	6	Not Free	Houari Boumediene
1974	6	6	Not Free	Houari Boumediene
1975	7	6	Not Free	Houari Boumediene
1976	6	6	Not Free	Houari Boumediene
1977	6	6	Not Free	Houari Boumediene
1978	6	6	Not Free	Rabah Bitat
1979	6	6	Not Free	Chadli Bendjedid
1980	6	6	Not Free	Chadli Bendjedid
1981	6	6	Not Free	Chadli Bendjedid
1982^{3}	6	6	Not Free	Chadli Bendjedid
1983	6	6	Not Free	Chadli Bendjedid
1984	6	6	Not Free	Chadli Bendjedid
1985	6	6	Not Free	Chadli Bendjedid
1986	6	6	Not Free	Chadli Bendjedid
1987	6	6	Not Free	Chadli Bendjedid
1988	5	6	Not Free	Chadli Bendjedid
1989	6	4	Partly Free	Chadli Bendjedid
1990	4	4	Partly Free	Chadli Bendjedid
1991	4	4	Partly Free	Chadli Bendjedid
1992	7	6	Not Free	Ali Kafi
1993	7	6	Not Free	Ali Kafi
1994	7	7	Not Free	Liamine Zéroual
1995	6	6	Not Free	Liamine Zéroual
1996	6	6	Not Free	Liamine Zéroual
1997	6	6	Not Free	Liamine Zéroual
1998	6	5	Not Free	Liamine Zéroual
1999	6	5	Not Free	Abdelaziz Bouteflika
2000	6	5	Not Free	Abdelaziz Bouteflika
2001	6	5	Not Free	Abdelaziz Bouteflika
2002	6	5	Not Free	Abdelaziz Bouteflika
2003	6	5	Not Free	Abdelaziz Bouteflika
2004	6	5	Not Free	Abdelaziz Bouteflika
2005	6	5	Not Free	Abdelaziz Bouteflika
2006	6	5	Not Free	Abdelaziz Bouteflika
2007	6	5	Not Free	Abdelaziz Bouteflika
2008	6	5	Not Free	Abdelaziz Bouteflika
2009	6	5	Not Free	Abdelaziz Bouteflika
2010	6	5	Not Free	Abdelaziz Bouteflika
2011	6	5	Not Free	Abdelaziz Bouteflika
2012	6	5	Not Free	Abdelaziz Bouteflika
2013	6	5	Not Free	Abdelaziz Bouteflika
2014	6	5	Not Free	Abdelaziz Bouteflika
2015	6	5	Not Free	Abdelaziz Bouteflika
2016	6	5	Not Free	Abdelaziz Bouteflika
2017	6	5	Not Free	Abdelaziz Bouteflika
2018	6	5	Not Free	Abdelaziz Bouteflika
2019	6	5	Not Free	Abdelaziz Bouteflika
2020	6	5	Not Free	Abdelmadjid Tebboune
2021	6	5	Not Free	Abdelmadjid Tebboune
2022	6	5	Not Free	Abdelmadjid Tebboune
2023	6	5	Not Free	Abdelmadjid Tebboune

In 2022, Freedom House rated Algeria's human rights as 32 out of 100 (not free).

== Basic rights ==
Discrimination based on birth, race, gender, and a number of other attributes is illegal, although women, in particular, face considerable and systemic discrimination. Although it is unconstitutional, the government monitors the communications of its political opponents, the news media, human-rights organizations, and terrorist suspects. Homes are searched without warrants. The constitution also guarantees freedom of speech and of the press, but with various caveats. Public comments about the conduct of government forces during the 1990s are illegal, as are criticism of Islam, speech that insults government leaders, or anything that threatens "national unity" or offends against "individual dignity".

Pressure is exerted by the government on the news media, largely by arresting journalists for defamation, which is defined broadly and punished harshly under Algerian law. Self-censorship by some journalists is common, although other journalists do not hesitate to criticize the government openly. Radio and TV, which are entirely state-owned, provide slanted coverage and deny access to opponents of the regime. Most newspapers are printed at government-owned presses, and the regime uses this fact to exert influence on editors and reporters. It also exerts influence by wielding the power of the government-owned advertising company to place or not place ads in various publications.

Internet access is usually not a problem, although the government monitors e-mail accounts and chat rooms. Academic conferences and the like are sometimes subject to governmental interference, with visas sometimes being denied to foreign scholars who have been invited to participate in such events. In the past, Algerian academics have needed official approval before attending conferences abroad, and are often denied that approval.

Though Algeria's constitution guarantees freedom of worship, it also declares Islam the state religion and prohibits activities incompatible with Islamic morals, and in reality religious liberty for non-Muslims is limited by a number of laws and practices. Registering non-Muslim groups is difficult, proselytizing is punishable by up to three years in jail, and Christian groups often have trouble obtaining visas, although this last problem has apparently eased in recent years. The Protestant Church of Algeria has been particularly targeted, with eighteen of their churches shut down between November, 2017 and October, 2019. This casts doubt on the state of religious freedom in Algeria. In general, non-Muslims are socially tolerated, but some discrimination and abuse exists, and many Christians keep a low profile.

Although the rights of assembly and of association are guaranteed by the constitution, they are severely curtailed in practice. Demonstrations have been banned in Algiers since 2000. Permits are required for public meetings, and are often difficult to obtain. Official approval is required in order to form political parties and many other types of organizations, such as NGOs.

While congratulating Algeria for lifting the state of emergency in February 2011, Human Rights Watch urged that the government still needed to "restore basic liberties" by amending "numerous repressive laws and end various arbitrary practices that have no legal basis". Sarah Leah Whitson of HRW said that lifting the state of emergency had had "very little impact on civil liberties because a whole range of laws is on the books that can be just as repressive, or applied in a repressive manner". Freedom of assembly, HRW noted, was "still stifled in Algiers, and inconsistently and selectively observed in the provinces".

In May 2012, HRW complained that the Algerian government had been using "arrests and other tactics to keep people from demonstrating in the capital in the period leading up to the May 10, 2012 elections". Peaceful demonstrators in Algiers, including at least one candidate for election, were being detained, and some individuals had been prevented from entering the city. HRW noted that while the state of emergency had technically been lifted February 2011, security forces were still enforcing "repressive laws on public gatherings, including a ban on gatherings in Algiers". HRW described these laws as being "contrary to Algeria's binding human rights obligations under international law" and called on the country's government to "end its unjustified restrictions on freedom of assembly in Algiers".

Similarly, although the constitution guarantees free movement, this, too, is restricted in practice. There are limits on travel to and through the country's southern provinces. The minister of interior is empowered to place people under house arrest. Young men who still owe the country military service cannot leave the country without permission. Married women cannot travel abroad without their husbands' permission.

A 1992 state of emergency law remains in effect, and the government is especially concerned with enforcing the restrictions on assembly and association. These restrictions, which are used to limit the activities of opposition political parties and other opponents of the regime, are among the major human-rights problems in Algeria.

On 21 February 2022, the Human Rights Watch reported that the Algerian authorities arbitrarily imprisoned human rights defenders, civil society activists, opposition figures and journalists for peacefully exercising their rights to speak and assemble.

On 2 March 2022, Amnesty International reported that Algerian authorities ramped up their assault on civil society, with 27 human rights defenders and peaceful activists arrested in February. According to the reports, the authorities have sought to suppress Hirak protests, have arrested hundreds of activists, human rights defenders and journalists, and held them in pretrial detention or sentenced them under vaguely worded charges.

== Women's rights ==
The Algerian Family Code of 1984, according to Amnesty International, "imposed many serious limitations on women's rights, including the right to equality before the law and the right of self-determination".

Under Algerian law, nonspousal rape is illegal, but spousal rape is not. Women often choose to report their rapes, but convictions can be difficult to obtain. Things have improved on these fronts since a 2007-2011 nationwide program to combat violence against women. Women abused by their husbands cannot file charges unless they can provide medical confirmation that they have been incapacitated for at least 15 days. A number of women's groups run rape-crisis centers and provide counseling to abused women, but have limited resources and have trouble getting spousal abuse taken seriously. Sexual harassment is a crime punishable by a fine. Women receive decent medical care during pregnancy and childbirth.

Although the sexes are equal under the constitution, there are discriminatory elements of sharia in Algerian law. Muslim women cannot marry non-Muslims, for example. Women have the ability to get a divorce and are usually awarded child custody, although certain decisions about children's lives remain in the father's hands. Men can marry up to four women, although this is supposedly allowed only if the first wife approves and if the man can afford it. Women can choose their own husbands. Daughters inherit less than their brothers by law. Women are discriminated against in employment. In cities, women are encouraged to seek an education, and more girls than boys actually make it through secondary school. In 2010, the majority of health-care and media professionals were women, as were many judges and business owners.

In a 2012 report, the UN Committee on the Elimination of Discrimination against Women called on Algeria to take action to "promote gender equality and eliminate patriarchal attitudes and deeprooted discriminatory stereotypes concerning the roles and responsibilities of women and men in the family and society". It asked Algeria specifically to promote equal opportunity in the workplace, to eliminate sexual stereotypes from school curricula, in the media, and among the judiciary, to pass legislation on violence against women, ensure that the definition of rape includes spousal rape.

In November 2019, a new constitution was approved by 66% of voters in a referendum, with a national turnout of 23%, a historical low. The new constitution included within it protections for women from "all forms of violence in all places and circumstances" in addition to the provision of "shelters, care centres, appropriate means of redress and free legal assistance". Despite this, it was reported that feminicides continued into 2020, with at least 36 murders of women and girls.

Between 2019 and 2021, the Féminicides Algérie platform registered 187 cases of men murdering women in Algeria because of their gender, referred to as femicides.

== Children's rights ==
A child can inherit Algerian nationality from either parent. The child of a Muslim father is automatically Muslim. Education through high school is free and, up to age 16, compulsory. Although illegal, child abuse is a problem, attributed to a "culture of violence". Child sexual abuse is technically punishable by 10-20 years in prison but offenders rarely receive such long sentences. Algeria is not a signatory of the 1980 Hague Convention on the Civil Aspects of International Child Abduction.

There is no organized system of adoption in Algeria, and orphans and other children are placed with guardians in accordance with the so-called "Kafala" system, under which the children are in a "precarious" situation, with very little in the way of individual rights, according to the UN Committee on the Rights of the Child. The system is inconsistent with the UN Convention on the Rights of the Child. Similar to other countries in the Maghreb region, this results in a high number of children in institutions in Algeria.

== Freedom of Assembly ==
Human Rights Watch said in its annual report -2015-2016- that Algerian authorities continued to suppress peaceful protests by prohibiting all kind of gatherings held without prior approval. According to Article 97 of the penal code, organizing or participating in an unauthorized gathering, even if it is peaceful, is regarding a crime and imposes a penalty of up to one year in prison. In February, a court sentenced eight members of the National Committee for the Defense of the Rights of Unemployed Workers to one-year prison after convicting them of "unauthorized gathering" and "exercising pressure on the decisions of magistrates".

== Disabled people's rights ==
Discrimination on the basis of disability is illegal, but this law is not well enforced, and social prejudice is common.

== LGBT rights ==
Homosexuality and lesbianism are punishable by up to 3 years imprisonment with fines up to 10,000 dinars, torture, beatings, or vigilante execution. Police join in on the attacks, are complicit, or turn a blind eye. There is intense social discrimination, and very few gay people live openly. Gender expression is banned and discrimination is rampant.

== HIV/AIDS rights ==
There is social discrimination against people with HIV/AIDS; the government reported in 2022 that it does not take measures to specifically prevent and treat HIV/AIDS in the LGBTQI+ community.

== Refugee and asylum seekers' rights ==
The country has provisions for helping refugees and asylum seekers, and works with the Office of the UN High Commissioner for Refugees (UNHCR) and other groups. Algeria has helped some such individuals from sub-Saharan Africa while turning away many others. In 2020, 17, 000 mostly sub-Saharan migrants were expelled from the country, including some asylum seekers.

== Employees' rights ==
Government approval is required to form unions, and a union can lose its legal status for various reasons. Strikes are permitted, but require government approval, and are only allowed after two weeks of mediation or conciliation. Collective bargaining is permitted. Forced labor is prohibited. The Ministry of Labor is supposed to enforce the ban on child labor, but 1.5 million Algerian children work, mostly on farms and in shops. There is a low minimum wage, but enforcement of it is inconsistent. however, the Algerian government is helping the workers with benefits. There are rules about work hours and the like which are better enforced in the public than in the private sector.

== Rights of persons under arrest ==
Arbitrary arrest and detention is unconstitutional in Algeria, but there is nonetheless frequent use of pretrial detention. A 2009 report noted that suspects were subjected to "physical abuse and other brutalities" while in pretrial detention and during questioning. A summons is required to compel a suspect to preliminary questioning and to compel defendants and plaintiffs to appear in court. Warrantless arrests may be made by police who have witnessed an offense. There are also rules indicating how long suspects may be held without charge, These procedures are usually followed. A major problem, however, is that suspects are often held before trial for very long periods. Prosecutors' requests to extend preventive detention are rarely denied by judges. There is no bail, but defendants are often released pending trial, and must report regularly to the police. The right to legal representation, and to government-paid counsel if one cannot afford to pay, is respected.

Torture is forbidden by law but there were a few reports of this in 2022.

On 28 December 2021 the Algerian authorities unjustly imprisoned Algerian blogger and activist Merzoug Touati. He was prosecuted for his online criticism of prison conditions. On 3 January 2022, he was sentenced to one year in prison and a fine of 100,000 dinars (US$700).

== Rights of persons on trial ==
Although Algeria's constitution stipulates that the judiciary is to be independent and provide fair trials, the president has ultimate power over the courts and defendants' rights are not always respected. Defendants enjoy the presumption of innocence, the right to present witnesses and evidence, the right to appeal, and other rights, and these rights are generally respected. In the past, verdicts have often been influenced by family connections and status. In February 2020, Algiers-based prosecutor Mohamed Sid Ahmed Belhadi was transferred to El Oued after calling for 16 Hirak protestors to be acquitted, citing their right to freedom of assembly.

Human Rights Watch complained in June 2012 about the cases of eight terror suspects who had been detained secretly for several years and who faced "trials of questionable fairness because the judges refuse to allow an important witness to testify". These cases, according to HRW, underscore "the continuing obstacles faced by those charged with terrorist offenses, even after authorities lifted a state of emergency in 2011, to obtaining justice that is both prompt and fair". Sarah Leah Whitson of HRW said that "President Abdelaziz Bouteflika speaks often about judicial reform, but when it comes to trying suspected militants, reform does not yet mean fairness."

== Rights of prisoners ==
As a rule, prison conditions are below international standards, and human-rights groups are not allowed to inspect many facilities. Overcrowding is a widespread problem, as are poor lighting, ventilation, food, and hygiene. Prisoners are allowed regular family visits and private worship. In the past, Amnesty International and Human Rights Watch have both complained that members of radical Islamic groups are treated more harshly in prison than others.

== Rights of journalists ==
In December 2016, the Euro-Mediterranean Human Rights Monitor issued a report regarding violation of media freedom in Algeria. Death of the journalist Mohammed Tamalt, 42, is an example of using the government its power to silence the individuals whose writing insulted the president of republic and the official bodies. He died after three- month hunger strike in Algeria prison on 11 December. He was sentenced two years and started his hunger the same day. He spent his three months in intensive care unit in a coma since he was suffering severe lung inflammation. He was deprived of his family and his lawyer visits. In addition, it showed that detention of a journalist because of his writing criticizing the government and not paying attention to their health are considered as violation of human rights. In July 2014, he was accused of being convicted committing crimes against the government by the Algerian court. As a result, he was sentenced two years as well as a payment of a fine of 140,000 Algerian Dinars (equal to $1800). Finally, it clarified that the Algerian government imposed restriction on freedom of the press; expression; and right to peaceful demonstration, protest and assembly as well as intensified censorship of the media and websites. Due to the fact that the journalists and activists criticize the ruling government, some media organizations' licenses are canceled.

== See also ==
- Freedom of expression in Algeria
- Censorship in Algeria
- Disability in Algeria
- Freedom of religion in Algeria
- Human trafficking in Algeria
- LGBT rights in Algeria
- Politics of Algeria

== Notes ==
1.Note that the "Year" signifies the "Year covered". Therefore the information for the year marked 2008 is from the report published in 2009, and so on.
2.As of January 1.
3.The 1982 report covers the year 1981 and the first half of 1982, and the following 1984 report covers the second half of 1982 and the whole of 1983. In the interest of simplicity, these two aberrant "year and a half" reports have been split into three year-long reports through interpolation.
