= Global Conferences on World's Religions after September 11 =

Following the September 11 attacks in the United States in 2001, religious and academic figures organized conferences in Montreal in 2006, 2011 and 2016. The aim was to counter any negative image of religion that may have resulted from the attacks, and to formulate a "Universal Declaration of Human Rights by the World's Religions".

== Brief account of the conferences ==
Religion in general began to acquire a negative connotation after the events of September 11, 2001 on account of the close association of these events with Islamic fundamentalism. Many in the academic and faith communities, however, felt that such a negative image of religion was detrimental to the future of humanity because religion is a major force in human affairs which can be harnessed for either good or evil. Many members of these communities also felt that associating religion exclusively with evil was not only historically inaccurate, it also deprived humanity of a major source of promoting well-being.

A series of conferences was therefore organized to emphasize that religion can play a positive role in human affairs, and to evolve a Universal Declaration of Human Rights by the World's religions.

The motto of the first global conference which met September 11–15, 2006, and was inaugurated by the Iranian Peace laureate Madam Shirin Ebadi was: "Can religion be a force for good?"

The second global conference met on September 4, 2011. It was inaugurated by Nobel Peace laureate the Dalai Lama with the motto: "Peace through religion."

The third conference met on September 15, 2016, at the Palais des Congrès in Montreal, Canada. The motto of this conference was" From Faith to Interfaith".

The theme which unifies all these conferences is that of evolving a Universal Declaration of Human Rights by the World's Religions, a project which was launched in Montreal in 1998 on the occasion of the celebration of the 50th anniversary of the adoption of the Universal Declaration of Human Rights by the United Nations.

== Importance of these conferences – The interface of religion and human rights ==
The relationship of the religions of the world and human rights has been a much debated issue ever since the adoption of the Universal Declaration of Human Rights on December 10, 1948, by the United Nations.

Two basic approaches to this relationship are prominent. According to one, religions have a negative relationship to human rights inasmuch as human rights discourse provides a norm in the light of which the doctrines and practices of the world's religions could be judged. Such an attempt reveals that religions often fall short of meeting human rights norms and therefore the relationship of religion to human rights acquires a negative aspect. Another view takes a somewhat opposite position. According to it, the religions of the world played a major role in the very formulation of human rights and can offer fresh perspectives on ways to secure human flourishing, which is the obvious goal of human rights discourse.

This more positive approach to the relationship between religion and human rights is evident in the various documents on human rights produced by the religions of the world, some of which are enumerated below.

1. Pacem in Terris (Peace on Earth), June 23, 1963
2. Declaration on Judaism and Human Rights, adopted in Montreal on April 23, 1974
3. a) Universal Islamic Declaration of Human Rights, September 19, 1981; b) The Dhaka Declaration of Human Rights in Islam, 1983; c) The Cairo Declaration on Human Rights in Islam, August 5, 1990; d) The Arab Charter on Human Rights, 22 May 2004
4. Universal Declaration of Human Rights by the Hindus, June 27, 1999

All these and similar declarations engage the issue of religion and human rights but from the perspective of only a single religious tradition, such as Judaism, Christianity, Islam, Hinduism, and so on. The three conferences mentioned above represent a progressive effort to formulate a joint response from the world's religions to the Universal Declaration of Human Rights, by way of formulating a Universal Declaration of Human Rights by the World's Religions, a project which has the support of five Nobel Peace laureates who are its patrons: the Dalai Lama, Archbishop Desmond Tutu, Madam Shirin Ebadi, Bishop Belo of Timor Leste, and Professor Elie Wiesel.
