= Faouzi Tarkhani =

French-Tunisian writer, rapper, and songwriter

- Born: 1975 (age 50–51); Sarcelles, Val-d'Oise, France
- Musical career
- Genres: Hip hop; French hip hop; R&B; funk; soul
- Instrument: Voice
- Years active: Since 1999
- Label: PolyGram

Faouzi Tarkhani (born 1975 in Sarcelles, Val-d'Oise, France) is a French-Tunisian writer, essayist, rapper, singer, and songwriter. After playing in the 1998 TV film Né quelque part by Malik Chibane, Faouzi released his first solo album, Guerrier pour la paix, in April 1999. His second solo album, entitled Brise de conscience, was released in 2001.

== Early life ==
Faouzi Tarkhani was born in 1975, in Sarcelles, Val-d'Oise, France. Following an accident when he was 11, he became blind.

== Musical career ==
Faouzi was one of the first hip-hop artists to escape Algeria's censorship.

His song "Le noir me met à l'abri" peaked at 61 on the Single Top 100 French Charts. Faouzi released his first solo studio album, Guerrier pour la paix, on 20 April 1999. The album used the sounds of rhythm and blues, funk, hip-hop, and West Coast hip hop. In 2001, he released his second studio album, Brise de conscience. The album, which was an opposition of suburban violence, featured singers Lââm, Faudel, Shurik'n and Bernard Lavilliers, as well as segments from non-musicians Dieudonné, Gad Elmaleh, Djamel Bourras, Tariq Abdul-Wahad, and Zinedine Zidane. The funds raised from the album were entirely donated to the organization created and named for the album, Brise de conscience.

== Writing career ==
On 3 November 2016, via Don Quichotte, he published his religious testimony, Mal vu, témoignage d'un salafiste qui condamne le terrorisme. In 2018, he published his first novel, Une Repentance. In May 2019, he released a children's book, La Juvenile Force contre Sambo le Terrible.

== Personal life ==
He has lived in Sarcelles since his birth. He married his wife, Melanie Diam’s, in 2006. They have three kids: one girl and two boys.

== Discography ==
=== Studio albums ===
- Guerrier pour la paix (1999)
- Brise de conscience (2001)

=== Singles ===
- "Un Mike Est Une Arme" (1999)
- "Le noir me met a l'abri" (1999)
- "Comme Le Vent" (1999)

== Written works ==
- Mal vu, témoignage d'un salafiste qui condamne le terrorisme, Don Quichotte, 2016, 208 pages, ISBN 978-2-35949-555-3.
- Une Repentance : roman, Afnil, 2018, 288 pages, ISBN 978-2956474401.
- La Juvénile Force contre Sambo le Terrible : roman jeunesse, Afnil, 2019, 154 pages, ISBN 978-2956474418.
