= Omar Belhouchet =

Algerian journalist

- Born: 9 February 1954 (age 72); Sétif, Algeria
- Education: University of Algiers
- Occupation: journalist
- Organization: El Watan
- Awards: International Press Freedom Award (1993); Golden Pen of Freedom Award (1998); World Press Freedom Hero (2000)

Omar Belhouchet (Arabic: عمر بلهوشات; born 9 February 1954 in Sétif) is an Algerian journalist who is renowned for his investigative reporting and supporting freedom of the press; his work and persistence have received international recognition. During the civil war of the 1990s, which put enormous pressure on the free press from both sides, Belhouchet was prosecuted numerous times by his government and survived two assassination attempts.

Belhouchet started his journalism career at Algérie Presse Service followed by reporting for El Moudjahid (English: "The Holy Warrior"), the FLN government-owned newspaper. After the government allowed independent newspapers, in 1990 Belhouchet founded the daily newspaper El Watan (English: "The Nation"), together with nineteen colleagues from El Moudjahid.

== Journalism ==
Belhouchet received a degree in economics from the University of Algiers, and first went to work for Algérie Presse Service. He moved as a journalist to El Moudjahid, the government-established newspaper of the FLN. In 1990, he left the paper to found the independent El Watan.

In a 1999 interview with the Committee to Protect Journalists, Belhouchet estimated that between 1993 and 1997, he faced thirty legal actions initiated by Algerian officials, sometimes requiring him to appear in court two or three times a week. He reported being threatened by Islamic militants more than 100 times. According to the New York Times, he has "narrowly escaped" two assassination attempts. One of these attempts occurred in 1993, when an assailant fired a machine gun at his car while he was driving his children to school; Belhouchet escaped by dropping low in the seat and gunning the accelerator. Islamist militants were suspected to be responsible.

In 1997, El Watan published an investigation into the suffocation deaths of 32 prisoners during the tenure of Justice Minister Muhammad Adami; the minister resigned several weeks after the article's publication. In November of that year, Belhouchet was convicted of "harming state institutions" and sentenced to one year in prison for a 1995 remark he made to French television stations Canal+ and TF1: "There are journalists that embarrass the authorities. I would not be surprised if tomorrow I found out that some of my colleagues were murdered by men in power."

In 2006, Belhouchet protested the banning of the Pop Idol-like show Star Academy from Algerian television in the face of Islamist protest, stating, "Today, they ban television shows. Tomorrow they will brain-wash the population, in the name of Islam."

Belhouchet lost a defamation suit in 2008 to a faith healer that he and El Watan reporter Salima Tlemçani had alleged to be a fraud; both were imprisoned for three months. The International Federation of Journalists issued a press release protesting the conviction as "another attempt by the powerful to silence investigative journalism by means of judicial interference". In 2009, Reporters Without Borders issued a protest on Belhouchet's behalf after judicial police reportedly summoned him for interrogation on defamation charges fourteen times in the space of a few weeks.

== International recognition ==
Belhouchet's work has received praise, awards, and support from numerous press freedom organizations. In 1993, he won the International Press Freedom Award of the committee to Protect Journalists, and the following year, he won the annual press freedom prize of the International Federation of Newspaper Publishers. He has also won the Maghreb Liberty Prize, the Golden Pen of Freedom Award of the World Association of Newspapers, the Rob Bakker Memorial Award in 1997, and the Friedrich Ebert Stiftung Human Rights Award in 1998. In 2000, the International Press Institute selected him as one of 50 World Press Freedom Heroes of the past half-century.

When UNESCO Director-General Federico Mayor protested one of Belhouchet's arrests, he also praised Belhouchet as "a journalist known for his professional competence and his devotion to press freedom".

== See also ==
- Censorship in Algeria
