= Ali El Kenz =

Algerian sociologist and writer (1946–2020)

- Born: 1946; Skikda, French Algeria
- Died: 1 November 2020 (aged 73–74); Nantes, France
- Occupations: Sociologist; Writer

Ali El Kenz (1946 – 1 November 2020) was an Algerian writer and sociologist. He was born in 1964 in Skikda. He began his academic career in the early seventies, he studied in the philosophy department at the University of Algiers. Then in the mid-seventies he chose to study sociology. One of his most prominent writings is a book called “Writing in the Exile” (original text: alkitaba fi almanafaa).

== Biography ==
Ali El Kenz is an Algerian academic who was an intellectual, a researcher, a sociologist, a writer. He was influenced by the late figures of sociology such as Ibn Khaldoun, Franz Fanon, Mustafa Al-Ashraf, and the Egyptian scientist Samir Amin, who published a number of studies with him.

== Works ==
- The Economy of Algeria (original text: alaiqtisad fi aljazayir) (1980)
- 5 studies on Algeria and the Arab world, Dar Buchan (original text: 5 dirasat hawl aljazayir walealam alearabii), (1990)
- Arab-European Relations (original text: alealaqat alearabia al'awribia), Arab Research Center, (2002), Cairo
- Identity and its Issues in Contemporary Arab Consciousness (original text: alhuia waqadayaha fi alwaey alearabii almueasir), Center for Arab Unity Studies, Beirut, (2013)

His French books:

- Le hasard et l'histoire (1990)
- Au fil de la crise (1993)
- Gramsci dans le monde arabe (1994)
- Le monde arabe (2003)
- Écrit d'exil (2009)

== Career ==
He was a professor at Algiers 1 University and the University of Nantes. He also wrote in the daily newspaper El Watan.

Assistant Professor of Philosophy at the University of Algiers (1970–1974)

Professor of Sociology at the same university until 1993.

Director of the Research Center in Applied Economics of the University of Algiers.

Associate Professor at Tunis University for two years from 1993 - 1994.

He also occupied several positions in the Arab Society for Sociology as well as the Council Development and Research in Social Sciences in Africa.

A scientific advisor in charge of the "science and society" axis at an American university.

== His scientific contributions ==
The founding of the Arab Society for Sociology, and the Jahizia Cultural Association which brought together a group of French Arab intellectuals and Arab sociologists.

As an outcome of a research in the social sciences in Algeria and the Arab world he published in the Ansaniyat Journal, the African Journal of Books and various major conferences.

He put his initiatives and experience in helping many scientific institutions around the world, especially the Council for the Development of Social Research in Africa (CODESRIA).

He contributed to the Algerian press and scientific magazines, especially Al-Ahdath newspaper and Al-Watan newspaper.

He collaborated with the Center for Maghreb Studies in Tunis in several researches and studies.

== His death ==
The late Ali El Kenz died at the age of 74 in the city of Nantes in France. According to his relatives he died because of an incurable disease.
