= Zahra Kamalkhani =

Zahra Kamalkhani (born 1954) is an Iranian anthropologist.

Zahra Kamalkhani was educated at the University of Tehran, University of Bergen and SOAS. She started teaching the anthropology of gender and Middle Eastern studies at the University of Bergen in 1986, completing her PhD there in 1996. She has lived in Bergen since 1981. She subsequently conducted post-doctoral research at Edith Cowan University and the University of Western Australia.

== Works ==
- Iranian immigrants and refugees in Norway, 1988
- Women's Everyday Religious Discourse in Iran, 1993
- Women's Islam: religious practice among women in today's Iran, 1998

=== Iranian Immigrants and Refugees in Norway (1988) ===
It is a six chapter monograph published by the University of Bergen, Department of Social Anthropology in 1988. The author herself calls it a report to map out the life and settlement of Iranian migrants in Norway. Two main stages of the Iranians' out-migration are described in the book. First section is about the historical context of migration, the factors that influenced the Iranians' decision to migrate. The second section is about the settlement of Iranian migrants in Norway, their adaptation and integration to the new social and cultural environment.

==== Reception ====
The language of the book is mainly descriptive and less analytical. There is less almost no information about the methodology of the research.

=== Women's Everyday Religious Discourse in Iran (1993) ===
The essay was published in the book Women in the Middle East: Perceptions, Realities, and Struggles for Liberation edited by Afshar Haleh. It is part of the project on Women’s Studies at York Series with the purpose of presenting real images of women from East who are often depicted "seductive and mysterious" In the notes about contributors of the book Kamalkhani was described as PhD candidate in the Department of Anthropology at the University of Bergan.

Kamalkhani's this essay focuses on complex religious rituals of Shiraz women as a unique way of performing their identities and political agency. The gatherings are referred as rowzeh (or rowzeh-zanāneh) which are stories about the Islamic saints (Imams) and oral narratives about the historical events significant for Iranian Shiism.

=== Women's Islam: religious practice among women in today's Iran (1998) ===
This book was initially published in 1998 based on Zahra Kamalkhani's Ph.D thesis. The book focuses on the religious practices and family rituals of Iranians women, particularly, women from Shiraz, the author's hometown. After returning to Iran in 1989, the author started to attend religious meetings performed and led by women and the idea of researching women's religious activities was born with this quest. As a native Iranian anthropologist, Kamalkhani describes that women-only religious meetings offered Iranian women public space to perform their identities as in most denominations of Islam and in Muslim cultures, women have comparatively limited participation in public space and Mosques.
