= Battle of Shwabir =

Battle of the Algerian War

- Part of Algerian War
Date	3 October 1956
Location	El Ghicha, Algeria
Result	Algerian victory, according to Algerian sources

Belligerents
(France) French Republic	(Algeria) FLN

Commanders and leaders
	(Algeria) El-Moulay Abdallah

Strength
16-truck convoy and four T-6 aircraft, according to Algerian sources	Four ALN battalions

Casualties and losses
Disputed: More than 1,375 killed and 500 wounded, and more than 90 trucks destroyed (Algerian accounts); 38 killed in ambushes near Aflou (French veterans' chronology, entry dated 5 October)	14 fighters and 11 civilians killed (Algerian accounts)

The Battle of El Chouabir was a battle in the El Chouabir area of the Al-Qaada mountains on October 3, 1956, between the Algerian National Liberation Army (ALN) and the French Army. Algerian accounts say the French Army lost 1,375 dead, including 91 senior officers, a figure attributed to an interview given by Colonel Lotfi to El Moudjahid in May 1959. The same accounts report 14 Algerian fighters and 11 civilians killed. A French veterans' chronology instead records 38 dead from the 1st and 110th infantry regiments in ambushes near Aflou, in an entry dated October 5.

According to Aissa Bougrine, the battle grew out of the Ambush of El Khetifa on October 2, 1956, is known as the "Mother of Battles," and was covered at the time by The Daily Gleaner, The New York Times, and Le Monde.

== See also ==
- Algerian War
- FLN
