= Universal Islamic Declaration of Human Rights =

The Universal Islamic Declaration of Human Rights is a document created by Islamic Councils in Paris and London. It restates basic human rights using the language of Islamic jurisprudence. The difference between the original Arabic version and the official English translation has been described as "very problematic." Among other problems, Mayer notes that throughout the document, references specifically to shari'a law are mentioned only as "the Law," which could mislead readers of only the English version.

Similar documents include the "Draft Charter on Human and People’s Rights in the Arab World", endorsed by the Arab Union of Lawyers in 1987, and the "Cairo Declaration on Human Rights in Islam", adopted by the Organisation of the Islamic Conference in 1990. The latter declaration was specifically written with more secular language than Universal Islamic Declaration, and was less biased against Shi'ite Islam.

== See also ==
- Arab Charter on Human Rights
