= Disability in Algeria =

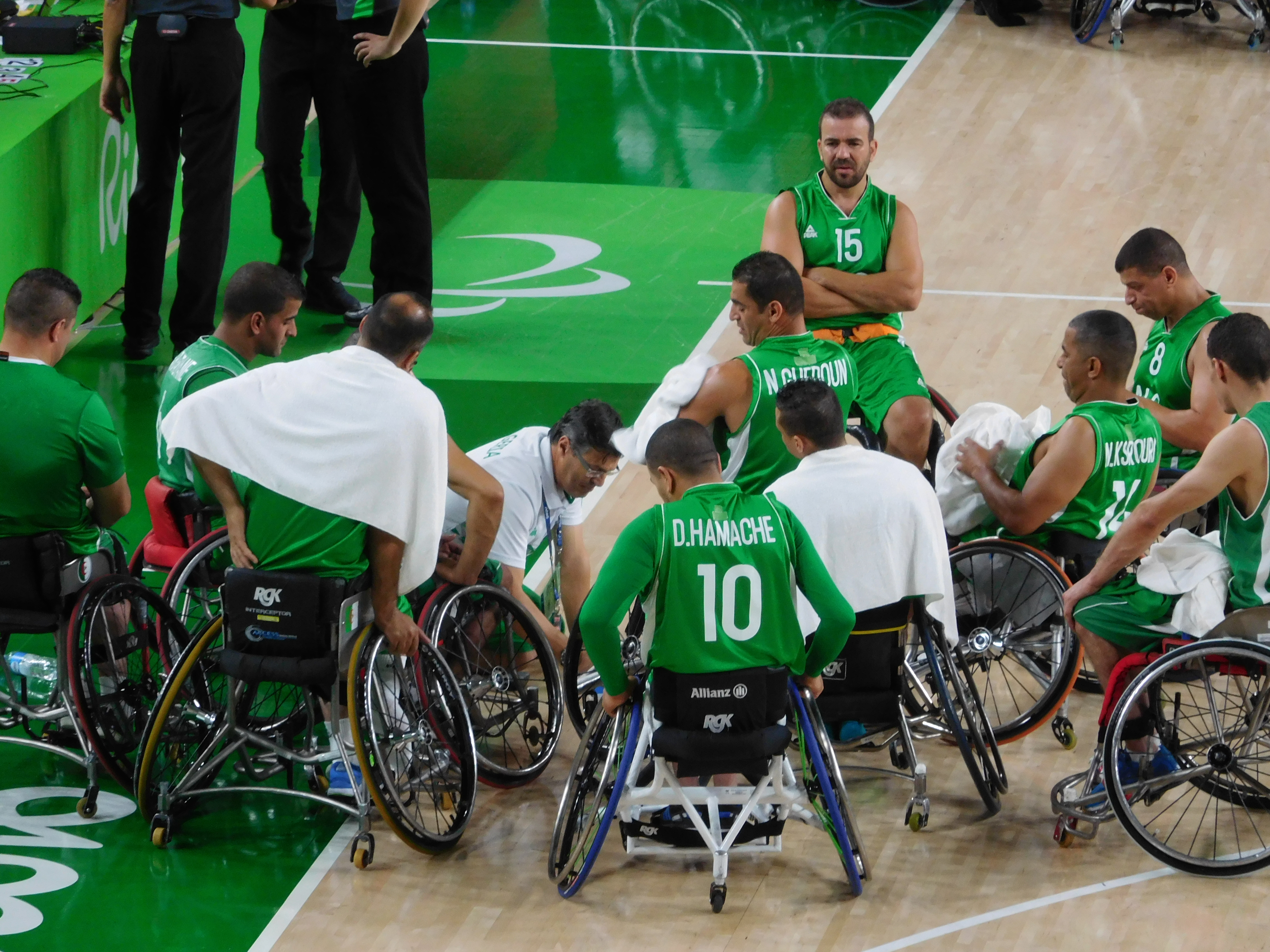
Algerian wheelchair basketball team at the 2016 Paralympics.

People with disability in Algeria are protected under the law. Algeria has adopted the Convention on the Rights of Persons with Disabilities and the Arab Charter on Human Rights. Algeria is working to make the country more accessible to people with disabilities. Overall, about 2.5 percent of the country has some type of disability with men having a higher rate of disability than women.

== History ==
One of the earliest descriptions of people using sign language occurs during the 4th century in Tagaste, which was located in what is now modern Algeria.

Early traditional views of people with blindness in countries in North Africa involved beliefs that it was based on family curses or djinn. Communities provided for the poor and people with disabilities through a special social tax called a zakât. Families also believed that marabouts could heal sick or disabled children, though marabouts, who used "mystical practices" were later denounced in 1930s.

In the early 20th century, the French had an influence on Algeria in relationship to helping people with blindness. A training workshop for people with blindness was created in Algiers in 1902. Later, schools for teaching Braille were also created in Algiers. Many children who were blind were sent to France to study on various scholarships.

In the 1940s, the government gave money to Muslim charities to help aid individuals with disabilities. Schools and institutions often favored the French and European individuals as opposed to the native Muslim Algerians. In the late 1940s, blind Algerians, such as André Balliste, fought for their rights. They were able to finally secure full rights in 1951.

In the 1950s, individuals could be issued a disability or blindness card which allowed them access to various accommodations.

== Demographics ==
In a 2006 survey, it was found that the rate of disability in Algeria was higher among men than in women. Overall, the survey found that the rate of disability in the population overall is around 2.5 percent. A 2017 survey found that 1.3 percent of the population has a developmental disability.

Individuals with disabilities often have a higher rate of poverty in Algeria.

== Causes ==
Landmines, which were placed in Algeria during World War II and from other conflicts have caused physical disabilities in the country.

== Policy ==
The Algerian government has passed laws which prevent discrimination against people with disabilities. The Ministry of Vocational Training and Education works to provide equal access to all groups of people, including people with disabilities to work and get vocational education.

People who have disability benefits in Algeria receive funds based on the extent of their disability. There is also a 100% grant for people with full disability under La Pension Handicapée.

Algeria is a member of the League of Arab States and signed onto the 2004 Arab Charter on Human Rights. Article 40 recognizes the human rights of people with disabilities. Algeria submitted an initial report on their progress in implementing the rights for people with disabilities in 2009.

=== Non-governmental organizations ===
Non-governmental organizations (NGO) receive a small portion of their financial budget from the government.

Humanity & Inclusion began to work in Algeria in 1998. The organization works towards the rights of people with disabilities and inclusive education.

=== Legislation ===
In 2002, Algeria passed a law protecting people with disabilities and which provided the following benefits: access to specialized hospitals, prosthetics and free transportation. Individuals who have become disabled due to landmine explosions are also provided guaranteed a minimum income and housing assistance. The law defines people with disabilities broadly and includes individuals who were born with disabilities as well as people who acquired them later in life. This law also works to provide accessibility for people with disabilities in the public sphere.

In January 2003, Executive Decree No. 03-45 was created to provide implementation of welfare and financial aid for people with disabilities. In April and October of that year, wilaya specialist medical and educational committees were created through Executive Decree No. 03-175 and 03-333 respectively.

Reduced fares and free transportation for people with disabilities was provided through Executive Decree No. 06–144 in April 2006. Also that same month, Executive Decree No. 06-145 was created to specify the membership and responsibilities of the National Council for Persons with Disabilities. In December 2006, accessibility was addressed by Executive Decree No. 06-455. This decree also addresses "reasonable accommodations" in different environments.

Two Executive Decrees in 2008 specify the creation of supported employment centres and sheltered workshops.

Algeria ratified the Convention on the Rights of Persons with Disabilities on May 12, 2009, through Presidential Decree No. 09-188.

In 2011, Prime Ministerial Instruction No. 368 specifies the mainstreaming of disability in several programmes.

=== Education ===
Algeria, in 1998, ordered that children who are in hospitals long-term must be provided education. Also that year, special education classes for hearing and visually impaired children was opened in the national education system. The Ministry of National Education and the Ministry of National Solidarity work to make sure that children with disabilities are able to fully access education whether they have a physical disability, sensory impairment or mental disability. Schools teaching blind children use sound libraries and Braille.

By the end of 2013, children with disabilities were passing primary school at a rate of 92.26%, lower secondary education at a rate of 58.36%, and earning a high school diploma at a rate of 47.10%. Many schools are not staffed with teachers who have training for special education.

== Accessibility ==
Algeria's National Office for Assistive Devices works to obtain, create and distribute necessary physical and technical aids to people with disabilities. Several of the country's ministries work with the National Commission on Accessibility to monitor implementation of building and public space accessibility.

Transport in Algeria has been modified to provide physical accessibility in several ways. Metro platforms have direct access for people with physical disabilities and provide special seating and room to maneuver on trains. Edges of platforms are marked with tactile paving. Similar modifications have been made on buses.

== Cultural attitudes ==
Blindness in many Muslim countries does not affect the social status of the individual.
