= Sexual taboo in the Middle East =

Regional social stigmas around sexuality

The Middle East, which is commonly known as a region that includes most countries of Southwestern Asia, the Persian Gulf, the Arabian Peninsula, and several North African countries, and are often seen as part of a wider cultural and geopolitical landscape. Majority of the people in these countries participate in Abrahamic religions such as Islam, Christianity, or Judaism, some of which prohibit premarital sex depending on the wide variety of different sects. While dating and premarital sex are looked down upon for religious and social reasons, it is not illegal. In addition, young people rarely learn about sexual health in school, and other sources of information may not be reliable.

Sexuality is an essential part of everyday life, which not only includes sex, gender identities and sexual orientation, but also pleasure and intimacy, and as the World Health Organization argued, the sexual health of a woman is physical, mental, and emotional state of being, which should be not tolerated but accepted. Cultural taboos consist of Sexual and Reproductive Health (SRH) and other related issues, such as early marriage, female genital mutation, sexually transmitted infections (STIs), and women who suffer from the ignorance of all of these, which globally seen as basic rights.

== Access to Sexual and Reproductive Health Education ==
Sexual health education differs across countries, reflecting a variation in cultural, religious, and political frameworks. Reproductive health (RH) is a part of sexual health, which can be defined to have a desirable and safe sexual life with the ability to reproduce and having a free will to determine if, when, and how we do so. RH also refers to the basic right to access health care and education which, for instance, allows women to have safe pregnancies and deliveries, but it should also enable the appropriate care and consultation concerning reproduction and sexually transmitted diseases.

In many Middle Eastern countries, young people primarily rely on their parents to receive information about sexual and reproductive health. However, cultural sensitivities create barriers for open communication, as many young people fear that their inquiry into sexuality will be interpreted as evidence of personal sexual activity. Media in the Middle East provides limited content related to sexual and reproductive health. Additionally, policy makers fall short in their advocating for comprehensive education in this area.

Development Alternatives with Women for a New Era (DAWN) argued that the SRH services are challenged by the lack of integration and inequity in access and also questionable quality of the services, therefore an urgent call is needed to the SRH services in the MENA region, making sure that these services are not distinguished between socio-economic levels, urban or rural areas, or between age groups, and to improve the quality of the services. DAWN also realized, that by engaging more in the region between research institutes, civil society, and governments, they are able to create better outcomes in the Middle East.

Quantitative research in the Middle East and particularly in surveys done with the youth have shown that there is a lack of adequate education of younger populations as to their sexual health, including taboos, contraception and family planning. Empirical data gained from interviews clearly show a clear discomfort of younger generations in broaching these subjects, making it all the more difficult to properly address the problem of their insufficient education.

As sexually transmitted diseases and infections can be especially preeminent in low-income countries, the sexual and reproductive health of younger individuals is seen as paramount by governments, NGOs and health professionals. Awareness of the dangers of unprotected sex and wider lack of reproductive healthcare infrastructure is the focus of many campaigns in increasing SRH.

=== Egypt ===
The formal education system in Egypt provides young people with very limited information on sex and reproductive health. A survey conducted in 2009 by the Population Council in Cairo showed that 15,000 people aged 10–29 received little to no information on sexual health from public school.

== Media literacy ==
It is paramount to look at sexual and reproductive education challenges using a single service delivery system as opposed to the current disposition of no vision at all. Among the numerous problems dogging media literacy in Middle East are reproductive health and sexual health issues. The twist in the tale is that premarital sex is largely prohibited while media coverage of such issues as sexual and reproductive health is considered taboo. This indicates a society characterized by self-denial and hypocrisy because people think and even know that sexual reproduction health is crucial but nobody wants to confront it.

== Perceptions of Premarital Relations ==
=== Iran ===
In recent decades, influenced by modernity and increased access to global technologies, Iran's traditionally conservative and religious society has gone through shifts in social values. These changes have widened the gap between the older and younger generation of Iranians, many of whom have begun delaying their marriages. As these marriages are delayed, the gap between puberty and marriage for young Iranian women increase, leading to more open and accepting attitudes toward premarital sex.

A majority of both men and women in Iran support dating as a way to get better acquainted with a potential spouse before marriage. However, when it came to intimacy and non-sexual contact, 69% of men were open to it compared to only 50.5% of women. Several factors could affect a person's attitudes towards premarital sex. Religion played a big part in the attitudes towards premarital sex. Those who identified as more religious were less inclined to premarital sex compared to those who identified as less religious.

=== Turkey ===
Turkey has been a secular country since 1928, but Islamic values are still present in daily life. With urbanization, majority of middle class urban family place less value on honor, and the separation of sexes is less strict. The younger generations have more access to autonomy and are thus less restrictive in interactions with the opposite sex and more accepting of Western practices.

A 2003 study done in Turkey including 124 undergraduate students and 60 adults, showed some of the various views on premarital sex. Premarital sex is growing more acceptable for men in Turkey, but is still widely disapproved of for women. Although men looked more negatively upon premarital sex, they engaged in premarital sex more than women did. Women who have engaged in premarital sex are looked at as being less desirable than women who are virgins. This reflects the value placed on female purity in Turkish culture.

== Political and Public Goodwill ==
Disconnect between policy, research, and practice is detrimental to sexual and health reproduction in Middle East. Usually, the official policies in Middle East do less than combat the underlying sexual taboo.

New policies and projects were introduced in connection to Sexual and Reproductive Rights in the region in the last two decades, however it should be a great importance to assure those rights in a more detailed manner.

All efforts by all stakeholders should ensure the following: prevention of early marriage through programs which take into consideration the circumstances and needs of the girls/women, their parents and communities prevention of FGM, legislative reform is needed in connection to abortion, SRH rights should be given not only to local, but for migrant workers as well, the region needs to develop a comprehensive sex education as an integral part o school curricula (and not only at universities), and they should develop comprehensive strategy to prevent gender based violence in the MENA region.

== Religion and Sexuality ==
The Middle East is home to many religions, with the three most widely practiced being Islam, Christianity, and Judaism.

=== Islam ===
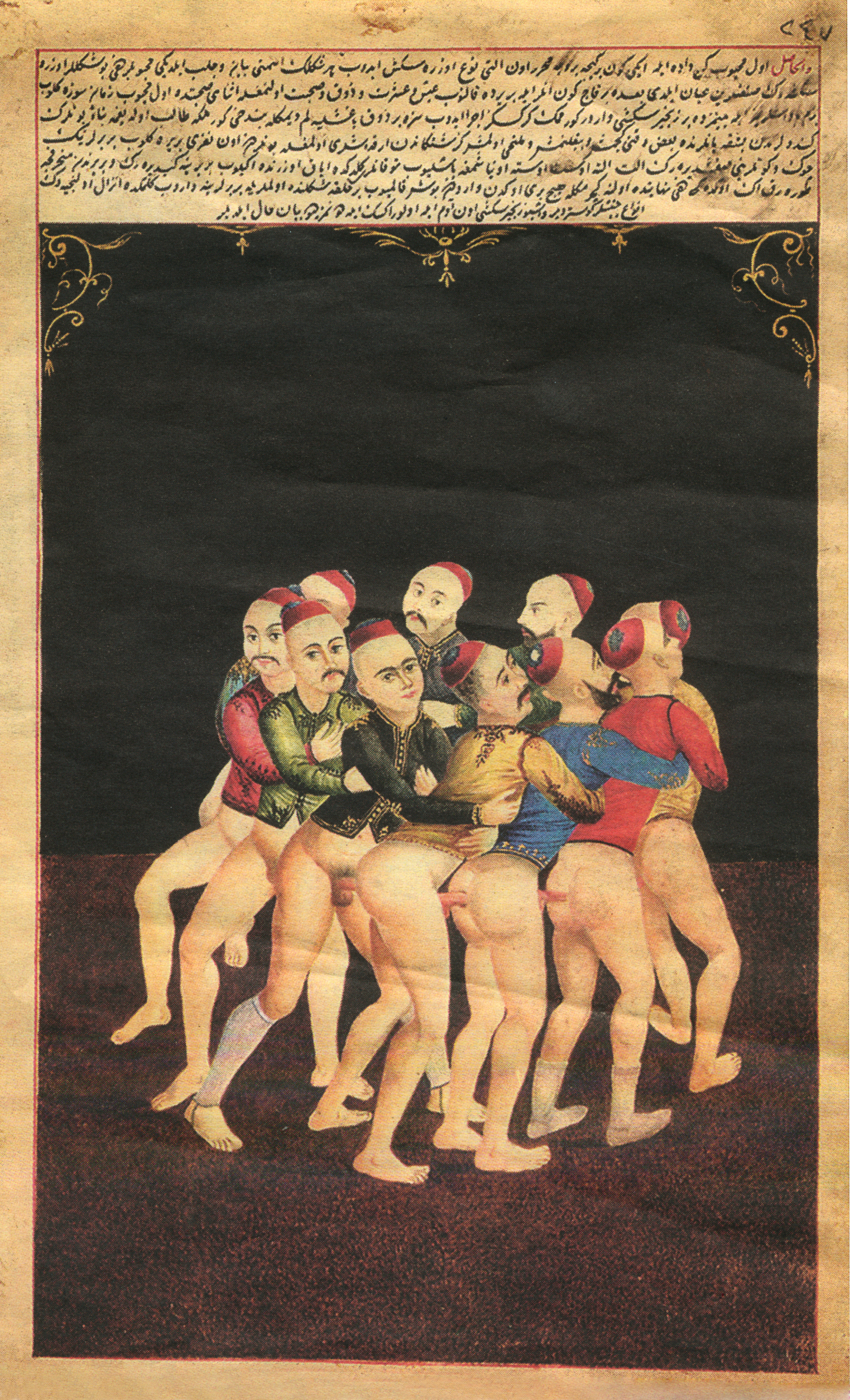
Turkish Erotic Manuscript, Dated 1817 AD

Although there are various interpretations of scripture, the hegemonic viewpoint paints homosexual attraction and gender diversity as problematic. Under Islamic law sodomy is prohibited. The story of "the people of Lut" in the Qur'an is often cited as God's forbidding homosexuality, Lot being the Islamic prophet who preached against homosexuality in the cities of Sodom and Gomorra. However, many Muslim scholars have argued that rather than homosexuality, the Story of Lot reflects God's anger toward the violence, inhospitality, and sexual immorality that occurred.

In addition to the hegemonic viewpoint on homosexuality and gender diversity, there are progressive Muslims who have interpreted the Qur'an differently. Throughout Islam's history, Islamic art such as poetry, literature, and paintings, have recorded sexual behavior between same-sex individuals. There is no record of the prophet punishing anyone for homosexuality. Their one interpretation holds that homosexuality in this case is a natural diversity that occurs in human societies.

=== Christianity ===
Christianity has a variety of sects in the Middle East, but two important ones are the Coptic and Maronites Churches. Maronites have long taken a stance against same-sex relations, and most recently, have rejected the Catholic Pope’s statement to welcome LGBTQ+ people into churches. The criminalization of homosexual relations with Article 534 of the Lebanese Penal code (Lebanon having the highest concentration of Maronites in the Middle East) was heavily supported by Maronite and Jesuit communities.

According to the Coptic Church “Everything that is created by God (specifically those attributes that relate to the image of God which all human were created on) is not just good but is very good (Genesis 1:31). This means that when the human being uses and expresses all the God given faculties in a proper way as intended by God, in the proper time and proper place, these things lead to edification and even to salvation. This includes the expression of love through the means of marital relations and sexuality.” This being said, same-sex marriage in most countries in the Middle East, rendering homosexuality intolerable by Coptic religious moors.

=== Judaism ===
There are many reactions to homosexuality within Judaism. Orthodox Judaism does not condone homosexuality as a way of life, however, with modernity, gay liberation movements have begun to challenge the Orthodox. Reconstructionist Judaism, a small movement in North America were accepting of homosexuality, being the first rabbinical school open to lesbian and gay students as well as to endorse same-sex ceremonies.

Although there exist many myths on sexuality within the Jewish community, many are misconceptions. There exist many specific restrictions on nuances of sexual contact, that vary with the wide number of communities around the MENA region. To exemplify, “Traditional Jewish observance expressly forbids sexual contact between spouses during the days of menstruation and for a week thereafter”. Despite this, Judaism is very encouraging towards sexual relations in the context of marriage, not only for the objective of bearing children, but also for sexual health and strengthening the marital bond.

== Advocacy for Sexual and Bodily Rights ==
In 2003 a conference was held at Malta, named the Sexual and Bodily Rights in the Middle East and North Africa, which was co-organized by Women for Women’s Human Rights and where 22 representatives of NGOs from Jordan, Egypt, Lebanon, Palestine, Tunisia, Morocco, Algeria, Turkey, Pakistan and the USA participated. Experts came from different backgrounds, such as healthcare, law, psychology, academia and education gathered together to have a discussion about the revealed human rights violations across the region.

The goal of the conference was to explore the themes of sexuality and gender issues around bodily rights, and to develop regional, national and international strategies to overcome these violations with the use of law, social and political practices. In the focus they placed the deconstructing taboos around sexuality, laws leading to violations of sexual and bodily rights, women’s rights to pleasure and to control over their bodies, and the eradication of all forms of violence.

During the conference they realised, that despite the positive changes across the region, sexuality for most part of the Middle East and North Africa still remains a taboo, where Islamic law treats rape not as a crime against God (as in case of adultery), but as theft or violation of property, and honour killings are encouraged in case of adultery if it is caused by a woman.

“Violations of women’s sexual and bodily rights do not simply originate from religion, but rather are the result of the combination of historical, traditional, social and economical constructs. Many violations in the region such as early, forced and temporary marriages, lack of alimony, honor crimes, stem from traditions and customary laws.”

== Sexual Diversity in the Middle East ==
=== Before Colonization ===
Prior to European colonization, same sex relations within Middle Eastern societies was neither an obscure concept or an entirely “taboo” concept. In Marshall Hodgson’s book, The Venture of Islam, he discusses that there was a common practice of homosexual relationships from the mid-10th century up until around the 1500s. These relationships were often characterized by an older man’s affection toward a prepubescent male. These relationships were often expressed through poetry, literature, and art — reflecting a wider understanding of the flexibility of desire.

Although there are limited verses in the Qur’an that address same-sex relations — most notably the story of Lot — the moral and legal condemnation centers on the act of sodomy, which is understood to be a major transgression (e.g. Surah Al-A’raf 7:80-84). However, the wider practice of same-sex relations was not relentlessly criminalized or socially shunned, and interpretations varied greatly between the region and eras.

Most importantly, pre-modern Middle Eastern societies encountered sexuality in a way that differs fundamentally from Western frameworks. The concept of fixed sexual identities — such as being “gay” or “lesbian” — was not a constructed category within these societies. Rather than understanding same-sex relations as a signal of personal identity, instead it was viewed through the lens of behavior, social status, and gender roles. In Joseph Massad’s article, Reorienting Desire, he explains that the concept of sexual identity is a distinctly Western perspective, which was enforced upon non-western societies through colonization. This historical dynamic calls into question contemporary assumptions and encourages a more complex understanding of how sexuality was established in the precolonial period.

=== Contemporary ===
The concept of homosexuality being regarded as “deviant” in the Middle East emerged with the presence of Europeans. Europeans were stunned by the seemingly overt display of same sex relations throughout the region. As their presence and authority within the Middle East grew in the 19th century — particularly due to the collapse of the Ottoman Empire and the aftermath of World War II — so did their ability to impose their views on morality and acceptable behavior, as well as their capacity to mold them. In one example of European suppression, upon arriving in Morocco after the establishment of the French Protectorate, French troops arrested all the adolescent boys on the street, who were later subjected to medical inspection. One of the French doctors involved explained the procedures, believing that with the repression of homosexuality “the education of the natives and by persuasion,” would proceed. The strong cultural stigma against homosexuality in the Middle East and the reality that it is frequently suppressed was heavily influenced by the influx of Europeans who abruptly imposed their own moral frameworks onto the local cultures. In reaction to Western Imperialism, many Arabs sought political and cultural independence. As a result, there was an influx in reform movements, resistance, and return to Islamic values. In response to the Islamic revival, Middle Eastern societies began to adhere more closely to the principles of the Qur'an, specifically the teachings that prohibit same sex relations.

Today, the rights of individuals who identify as LGBTQ+ face severe legal and social limitations in the Middle East. In many countries throughout the region, including Iran, Saudi Arabia, Qatar, and Yemen, same-sex relationships are criminalized and can carry harsh punishments such as imprisonment and death penalty. Even in countries where anti LGBTQ+ laws are less strict, widespread stigma and discrimination compel LGBTQ+ identifying individuals to live in secrecy.

=== Analysis of Western Moral Influence on Sexuality ===
Today, for some, the Middle East is often seen as one of the most repressive regions with regards to sexual expression. Some historians have argued, however, that with respect to homosexuality, such repression was due to influence from the West. [T]he encounter with European Victorian morality was to have profound effects on local attitudes toward what came to be called "sexual inversion" or "sexual perversion" (shudhūdh jinsā). With the Middle East's contact with the West came an increasing importance placed on assimilation, so to speak, with the values and systems prescribed from the West. The rise in participation in international markets came the destruction of the kinship-based community and an increasing stigma toward homosexuality. "‘The concept of homosexuality as defining a particular type person and a category of ‘deviance’ came to the Middle East [through the agency] of the West’ as well. Until Western influence, homosexuality did not carry a negative connotation in the Muslim world. The change in community structure and the rising influence of Western perceptions thus largely created the contemporary taboo against homosexuality in Muslim societies."

== See also ==
- Democracy in the Middle East
- Education in the Middle East and North Africa
- Human rights in the Middle East
- Human trafficking in the Middle East
- LGBT in the Middle East
- Women in Arab societies
- Cousin marriage in the Middle East
- Freedom of religion in the Middle East
- Islam and modernity
- Middle East and globalization
- Pederasty
- History of concubinage in the Muslim world
- Concubinage in Islam
