= Human trafficking in the Middle East =

The trafficking of persons is the fastest growing and most profitable criminal activity after drug and arms trafficking. According to the United Nations Protocol to Prevent, Suppress and Punish Trafficking in Persons, Especially Women and Children, human trafficking is defined as follows: “Trafficking in persons shall mean the recruitment, transportation, transfer, harboring or receipt of persons, by means of the threat or use of force or other forms of coercion, of abduction, of fraud, of deception, of the abuse of power or of a position of vulnerability or of the giving or receiving of payments or benefits to achieve the consent of a person having control over another person, for the purpose of exploitation. Exploitation shall include, at a minimum, the exploitation of the prostitution of others or other forms of sexual exploitation, forced labor or services, slavery or practices similar to slavery, servitude or the removal of organs.”

== Prevalence ==
According to Kapstein in the Journal of Foreign Affairs, the industrial states have failed to put in much effort to alleviate the issue. He believes that the problem is not one of political capability, but political will. A challenge in combating human trafficking in Middle Eastern countries is that the governments deny there is a problem. The lack of political will is partially the result of empty threats from the international community, but most of it can be attributed to deeper economic forces and sociological factors at play. In her article in "Global Tides," Stephanie Doe states that sex trafficking is a sensitive topic in the Middle East for various reasons. On one level, it suggests moral corruption, which implies the waning influence of Islamic values in society. On a more significant level, in most Middle Eastern countries, because the governments are responsible for preserving tradition and upholding Islamic authority, it challenges their ability to retain a nation unified by Islam. Consequently, if the government was to acknowledge sex trafficking as a problem, it could be interpreted as alluding to the state's diminishing power. It is difficult to quantify how large the problem of human trafficking is because trafficked persons are usually kept out of sight and in inaccessible locations. Human trafficking is an underground activity and the victims are referred to as a “hidden population.” The profits from this industry often go through a process of money laundering, making it difficult to trace the activities of traffickers. Girls and women who are sexually exploited by rape, forced prostitution, or sexual slavery are tainted with social stigmas for the rest of their lives. The link to sexual immorality further exacerbates this stigma. Once that link is created, the damage to the woman's reputation can never be undone. In 2003, a study published in the Journal of Trauma Practice found that 89 percent of women in prostitution wanted to escape. Additionally, 60-75 percent of women in prostitution had been raped and 70-95 percent had been physically assaulted.

== Types of trafficking in the Middle East ==
For the majority of the 1990s, human trafficking was incorrectly defined as illegal migration, smuggling, or sex work. The UN Protocol to Prevent, Suppress, and Punish Trafficking in Persons defines trafficking comprehensively: its focus is on coercion for the purpose of exploitation, and it precludes the possibility of legal consent by the victims of traffickers. In the Middle East, some of the most prevalent forms of human trafficking are forced labor of migrant workers, sexual enslavement and forced prostitution and camel jockeying of young boys.

=== Forced labor ===
Today slavery typically involves women and children being sold into involuntary servitude by the means of violence and deprivation. There is a clear lack of labor protection laws for domestic workers in the GCC (Gulf Cooperation Council) countries. The international community recognizes the trafficking of women and children as a modern form of slavery. Many migrant people, mainly from Asian states, are tricked into coming to the Middle East, where they find themselves in a forced labor situation or working for very low wages. Traffickers trap their victims by coercion, force, or fraud. The forced labor of migrant workers is especially prevalent in the oil-rich Persian Gulf states of Kuwait, Oman, Qatar, and the United Arab Emirates. The workers are frequently held to pay off the debt they have accumulated from the costs of travel and housing.

In July 2022, a research body from Washington DC, The Wilson Center published a report stating that Qatar passed legislation to improve conditions for migrant workers, becoming the first Gulf country to allow workers to switch jobs before their contract has expired and the second to set a minimum wage for migrant workers. According to an International Labor Organization's representative, there was progress in worker mobility, in addition to other concerns like occupational safety, access to justice, and representation on labor committees. “Both the resources and watchful eye of the ILO have proven critical to support legislative progress” said the representative.

Trafficking from South Asia to the Middle East is a serious problem, with about 200,000 persons trafficked over 20 years, and 3,400 children over the last 10 years. The International Labor Organization estimates the minimum number of persons in forced labor in the Middle East and North Africa is around 230,000.

=== Sexual enslavement ===
Most commonly, but not exclusively, human trafficking is exploitation in the form of forced prostitution or sexual enslavement. State authorities have typically confused sex trafficking with prostitution. Some young impoverished women are attracted to the sex industry because it appears to offer quick and easy money. Traffickers often lure desperate young women with the promise of a better paying job or higher education into a destination country where their documentation and passports are forcibly taken from them as soon as they arrive. These women often find themselves in slave-like situations. Once trafficked into the sex industry, traffickers control the women through physical and psychological means. Prostitution in the Middle East is strictly illegal, along with all sexual activity outside lawful marriage. The religious outlawing of extramarital sex reinforces this trade and consequently further bolsters the demand for prostitution. The issue is exacerbated by the lack of legislative actions taken by states to control prostitution and trafficking.

=== Camel jockeying ===
Even though the most common forms of human trafficking are sexual enslavement and forced labor, these are not the only cases. The type of trafficking that is quite unique to the Middle East is the forced camel jockeying of young boys. Camel racing is a particularly dangerous and violent practice that young boys are forced into against their will. Boys from Bangladesh, India and Pakistan are recruited around five years of age to be camel jockeys in Middle Eastern countries such as the United Arab Emirates. Their parents normally sell them to agents who go around poor districts in these countries and offer to take male children away to the UAE to work. These agents tell parents that the children will earn large sums of money that will be sent home to the families. The parents are typically deceived about the conditions of work. They are led to believe that the children are going to obtain good jobs and will have a better future than if they remain at home. Usually the boys do not know who is taking them abroad or for what purpose. Most of the boys are not aware they will become camel jockeys against their will. When they arrive in the UAE, the children are transferred to azbas, which are camel training complexes in the desert. The children are subject to several forms of abuse during their stay, including punishments such as a lack of food and electric shocks. Lack of food is a common practice because their owners try to maintain their weight at less than 20 kg (44 lbs) for racing purposes. Deaths and injuries of children during racing is another major concern. If children accidentally die during a race they are buried straight away to avoid police investigations of the death. The conditions in the azbas are very restricting. Children are not allowed to leave the camel training complex. They sleep on cardboard boxes, making them very prone to scorpion bites. The children rise at 4:00am to begin exercising the camels. Every day they take the camels for rides until 11:00am. Then they are allowed to rest for two hours before feeding and cleaning the camels. Then they exercise the camels again until nightfall. The children are supposed to be paid for their work but that is almost never the case. The agent usually takes the salary and keeps it without allocating any to the child or his family. Running away is a virtual impossibility for children deployed as camel jockeys since the azbas are usually in remote desert locations. Usually children leave when they become too old or heavy and are no longer considered suitable for camel racing. Other children are sent home because they become seriously injured from racing. Police or immigration rescues are virtually unknown in the azbas.

== Driving forces behind trafficking ==
=== Foreign migration ===
One of the major forces driving human trafficking in the Middle East is the large influx of foreign migration. Research conducted in 1996 on the routes of illegal migration, smuggling and trafficking concluded that over the period 1992–97, the majority of illegal migrants to Europe had originated from Iraq, China, Pakistan, India or Africa. The International Organization for Migration (IOM) notes trafficking of women from Ghana to Lebanon, Libya and EU countries, women for domestic service from Central and West Africa to Saudi Arabia and Kuwait, and even voluntary migrations of women from Ethiopia to the Middle East, where working conditions are considered to be virtual slavery. The Middle East is a destination region for men and women trafficked for the purpose of commercial and sexual exploitation. Wealthy Arab men from the Persian Gulf area have been known to rent flats that are ‘furnished with housemaids’ for anywhere from a few hours to a few months. Most of the prostitutes and human trafficking victims tend to be from Ethiopia, Nigeria, and Pakistan. Very few countries in the Middle East are devoid of the commercial sex industry.

=== Poverty ===
Of the many locations where human trafficking is prevalent in the Middle East, most are characterized by poverty. Human trafficking is a market fueled by principles of supply and demand. Therefore, where there is poverty, there is a likely supply to meet the growing demand for sexual entertainment. Economic vulnerability increases the likelihood of women becoming sexual commodities for wealthy Arabs in the Persian Gulf area. Although there are overwhelming social implications, there also seem to be regional financial patterns that perpetuate this trend. Fewer work opportunities for women have led to prostitution as an alternative. For example, in Egypt, women from lower-class backgrounds see that a few nights in prostitution generates more money than one month's work in the public sector. This makes Egypt a popular location for international sex tourism. Despite sex tourism being illegal, Egyptians find it hard to turn away Gulf hard currency due to their crumbling economy. The proliferation of prostitution, sex tourism, and misyar marriages can be understood as the consequence of uneven economic development, further exacerbated by principles of supply and demand. Persian Gulf nationals have the will and the means to pursue sexual entertainment, and poorer Muslim communities can supply services in return for financial security.

== Misyar marriages ==
To avoid the repercussions of sex outside marriage, Middle Eastern men and women in certain countries engage in a common practice by the name of "misyar marriage", also called Nikah Misyar. This type of marriage was born for the sole purpose of physical pleasure. It can be defined as a “temporary marriage,” or its literal translation, “traveling marriage.” Misyar marriages do not require cohabitation of the husband and wife, long-term commitment, welfare provisions to the wife, or the intention of procreating, which are all the elements of a traditional Islamic marriage. While misyar marriages do have a technical contract, the duration of the marriage is not explicitly stated in the contract but instead implied. Misyar marriages have been commonly referred to as “legal prostitution,” A marriage of this kind is not an option for a woman who wants to be viewed as respectable because it compromises many of her rights and basic values. Despite its controversial nature, misyar marriages are both religiously and legally accepted as valid marriages. According to Syed Ahmad, misyar marriages are popular in Islamic countries because it legitimizes sexual relations outside conventional marriages. Sheikh Yusuf Al-Qaradawi, a leading authority and one of the few remaining figures of Islamic scholarship, states that the misyar marriage is religiously legitimate. Al-Qaradawi adds that “there is no doubt that such marriage may be somehow socially unacceptable, but there is a big difference between what is Islamically valid and what is socially acceptable.” He is indicating that as long as both parties accept the terms of the marriage contract, they are legally married in the eyes of Allah. Misyar marriages purportedly prevent unmarried youth and widows from fulfilling their sexual desires outside marriage, which would traditionally be considered sinful. Misyar legitimizes these acts that would otherwise be seen as unlawful. The Middle East is well known for its strict observation of moral codes and sensitivity to the taboo subject of sex. In most societies of the Middle East where Islam is the dominant religion, premarital and extramarital sex is considered fornication. In a few countries, fornicators receive one hundred lashes of a whip with a crowd of witnesses for sins such as premarital sex. Zina is the word in many Middle Eastern countries for the concept of sexual misconduct by men and women. Despite all of these repercussions for extramarital sex, media coverage and human rights groups are revealing that prostitution is present and thriving in the Middle East. Misyar marriages also tend to exploit the economic vulnerability of women in poverty.

== See also ==
- That Most Precious Merchandise: The Mediterranean Trade in Black Sea Slaves, 1260-1500
- Human rights in the Middle East
- LGBT in the Middle East
- Sexual taboo in the Middle East
- Women in Arab societies
- History of slavery in the Muslim world
- Sex trafficking in Dubai
