= El Moudjahid =

Algerian French-language newspaper

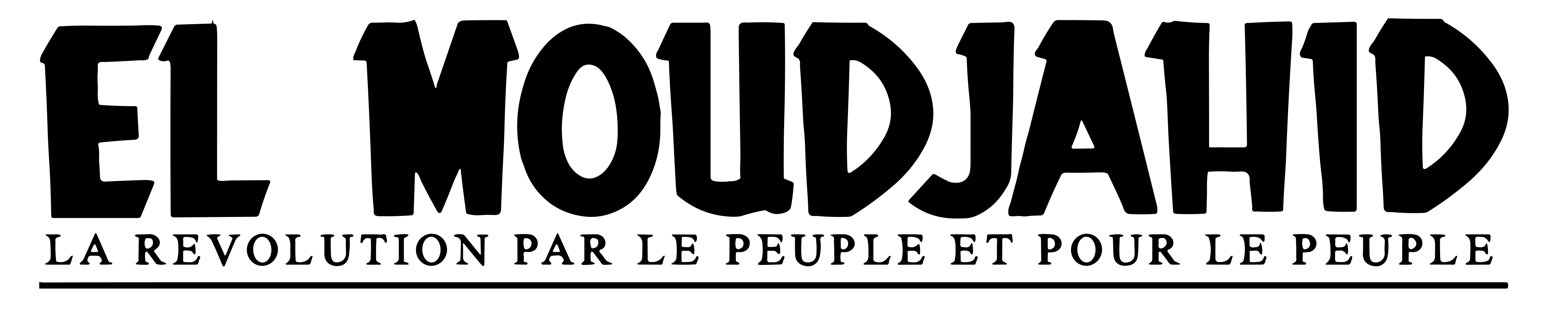
- Type: Daily newspaper
- Founded: 22 June 1965; 61 years ago
- Language: French
- Headquarters: Algiers, Algeria
- ISSN: 1111-0287
- Website: www.elmoudjahid.com

El Moudjahid ("The Struggler") is an Algerian French-language newspaper. It was founded during the Algerian War to inform FLN resistance fighters, and after independence it became the newspaper of the single-party FLN government. After the FLN was voted out of power in 1991, the newspaper ceased its affiliation with that party.

== History and profile ==
El Moudjahid was originally conceived as an FLN guerrilla information bulletin during the 1954-62 Algerian War, circulated among resistance fighters. Its name, a French transliteration of the Arabic مجاهد (Mujahid), means "holy warrior", which the FLN called its fighters. Noted writer, activist and psychiatrist Frantz Fanon wrote for the newspaper. Eveline Safir Lavalette also worked on this newspaper, notably distributing pamphlets for it.

After the war, in 1962 this became the chief newspaper of Algeria. It served as a propaganda organ for the single-party FLN government. When Algeria opened up its closed system in 1988 and allowed for the publication of independent newspapers, El Moujahid continued to publish. Today it is a state newspaper, but its ties with the FLN were cut after the party was voted out of power in the 1991 elections.

It is published daily, except Fridays, which in Algeria is the weekly holiday. The paper's headquarters are on the Algiers seafront, near the parliament and central bank.

Omar Belhouchet, an award-winning journalist, worked at El Moudjahid early in his career. In 1990 he left with nineteen colleagues to found the independent El Watan.

== See also ==
- List of newspapers in Algeria
