= El Watan =

French-language Algerian newspaper

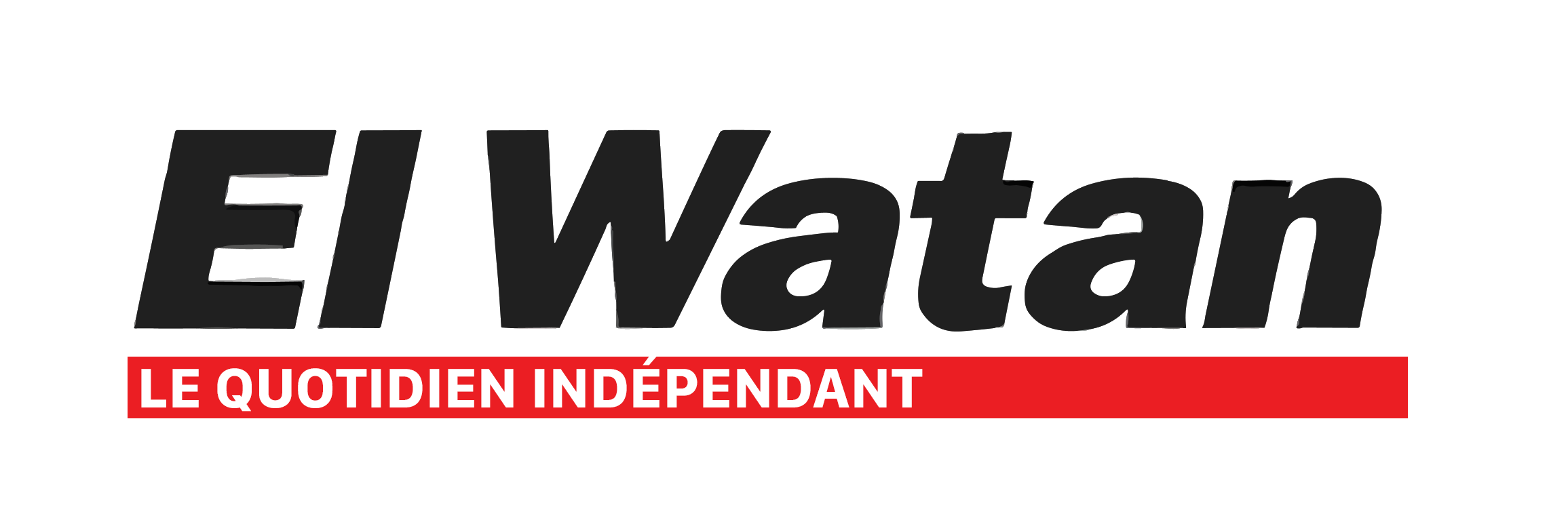
- El Watan logo
- Type: Daily newspaper
- Format: Tabloid
- Owner: SPA El Watan Presse
- Editor: Mohamed Tahar Messaoudi
- Founded: October 8, 1990
- Political alignment: Centre-right
- Language: French
- Headquarters: Maison de La presse Tahar Djaout, 1er Mai, Algiers, Algeria
- Circulation: 200,000 (May 2006 – May 2007)
- Website: El Watan

El Watan (Arabic: الوطن, "The Homeland") is an independent French-language newspaper in Algeria.

== History and profile ==
The paper was founded in 1990 after Omar Belhouchet and nineteen colleagues left the FLN government-owned newspaper El Moudjahid (English: "The Martyr").

It aims to promote democracy and to give coverage to the Algerian opposition, and has acted as an outspoken voice against censorship and corruption. It has been suspended several times by the Algerian government, and journalists and editors jailed for various offenses. Its reporters have, according to the international press watchdogs Reporters Without Borders (RSF) and Committee to Protect Journalists (CPJ) been targeted by both government forces and Islamist insurgents.

In July 2007, the paper started the first weekend edition in Algeria. Subsequently, the newspaper started economic, real estate, and television supplements, with the goal of having one supplement per day. In 2008, El Watan launched a trilingual Arabic, English, and French website. Fayçal Métaoui, an El Watan journalist, said that the paper created the website because its most significant competition originated from Arabic-language and English-language news sites.

El Watan is one of the few newspapers in Algeria to own its own private printing facilities.

== Controversy and Strikes ==
El Watan has faced numerous boycotts from the Algerian National Publishing and Advertising Agency (ANEP) and the Algerian Press Service (APS), preventing the newspaper from accessing public advertisement. In 2018, El Watan editor Omar Belhouchet noted that fear of reprisals have led "media companies [to] self-censor regarding certain topics".

In September 2020, El Watan released a critical report detailing alleged large-scale corruption by Ahmed Gaid Salah, son of a late Army Chief of Staff. The report prompted the government to suspend El Watan’s advertising revenue and the newspaper eventually responded by emphasizing its support for the army.

In 2022, following months of inconsistent, and then unpaid, salaries, El Watan's staff went on strike. Newspaper management claimed unpaid salaries were due to revenue lost from bullying from the state, as well as improper notification of debt repayment by tax authorities and Crédit Populaire d’Algérie's decision to "freeze the company's accounts despite continuous attempts to find a solution to the problem". Creditors responded that the newspaper has substantial unpaid debt.

In an effort to regain revenue, El Watan negotiated with ANEP and APS to allow the newspaper access to free public advertisement. Subtle changes in the newspaper's outputs following the end of strikes in late 2022 have been noted, especially in regards to foreign parties Algeria is increasing its economic and political relationships with.

== Global Popularity ==
The paper's online version was the 45th most visited website for 2010 in the MENA region.

== See also ==
- List of newspapers in Algeria
- Censorship in Algeria
- Arab News
- The Jordan Times
