= Human rights in the Middle East =

Humans rights situation since World War II

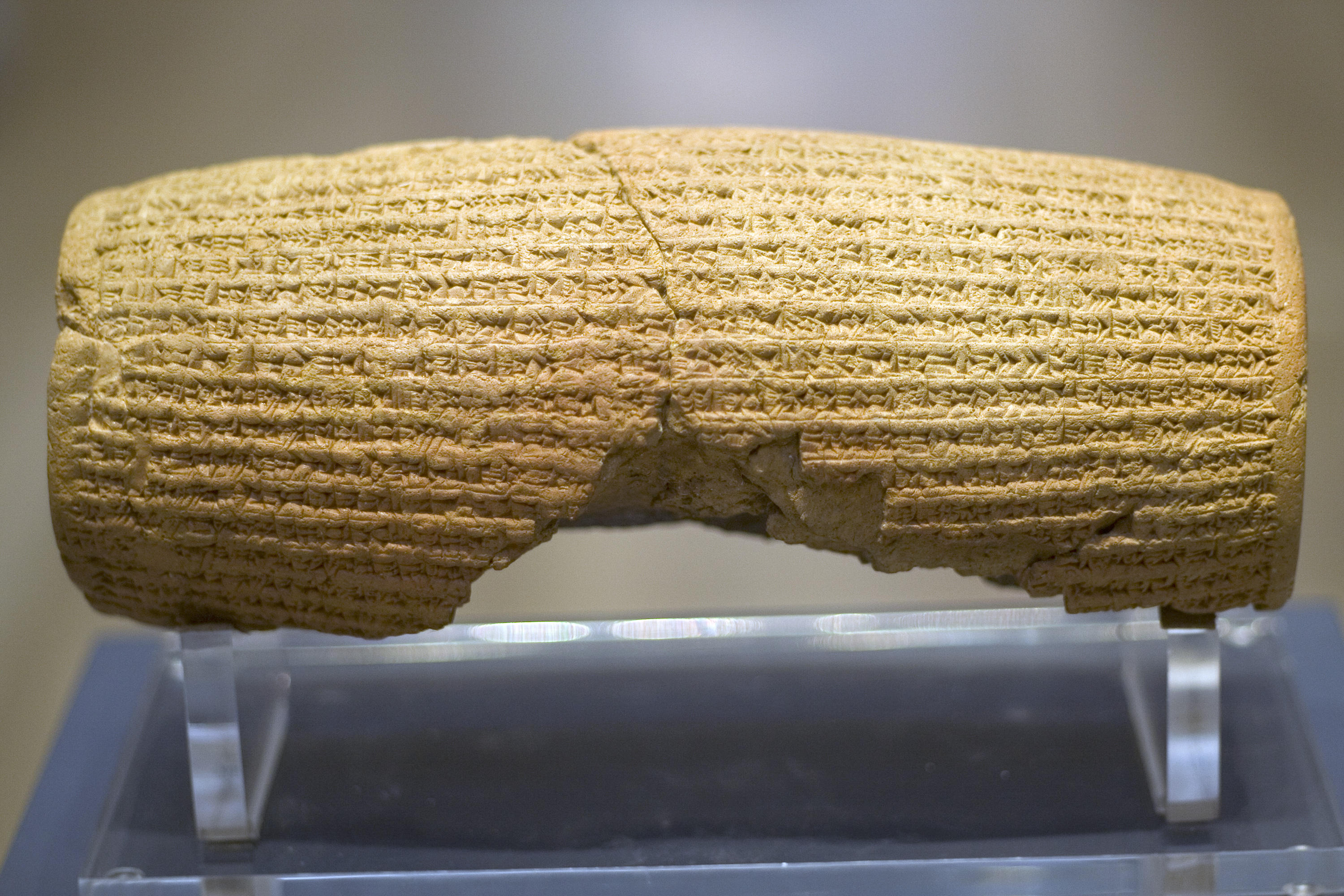
The advocacy for religious freedom by Iranian King Cyrus the Great, preserved in the Cyrus Cylinder, has been claimed as the first declaration of human rights.

Human rights in the Middle East have been shaped by the legal and political development of international human rights law after the Second World War, and their application to the Middle East. The 2004 United Nations Arab Human Development Report (AHDR) claimed that although Arab-Islamic tradition does hold unique importance for ideas of human welfare, history has proven that "they were not sufficiently prevalent in society to foster a culture based on a political contract, and allow for the legitimacy of differences of opinion, dialogue and transfer of power." Issues of the validity of democracy in the region and human rights are at the very centre of the challenges facing Middle Eastern society today.

== Legal framework ==
=== International obligations ===
In 1948 Egypt, Iran and Pakistan signed the Universal Declaration of Human Rights (UDHR). Saudi Arabia did not, arguing that it "failed to take into consideration the cultural and religious context of non-Western countries."

The Cairo Declaration of Human Rights in Islam was adopted by 45 member states of the Organisation of Islamic Cooperation (OIC) in August 1990. This declaration undermines many of the rights the UDHR guarantees allowing all the member states to abide by a set of human rights based on Shari'a law. For example, Article 18 of the UDHR establishes that everyone has the "right to freedom of religion, freedom to change his religion and freedom to manifest his religion in teaching, practice, worship and observance". Article 10 of the CDHRI establishes that "It is prohibited to exercise any form of compulsion on man or to exploit his poverty or ignorance in order to convert him to another religion or to atheism."

The Arab Human Rights Committee was established in 2009 to oversee compliance with the Arab Charter on Human Rights, which entered into force in March 2017. As of the beginning of October 2009, ten Arab states ratified the Arab Charter on Human Rights. These are: Algeria, Bahrain, Jordan, Libya, Palestine, Qatar, Saudi Arabia, Syria, United Arab Emirates, and Yemen. As of February 2012, another four States ratified the Arab Charter on Human Rights. These were: Iraq, Kuwait, Lebanon, and Sudan. The Charter creates a process through which the committee receives and reviews state reports and makes recommendations as appropriate. The Charter does not provide for a complaints mechanism.

The committee has had three sessions, during which it has been focusing on "procedural aspects of organising its work".

== Human rights issues ==
=== Capital punishment ===
In regards to capital punishment the countries of the region can be separated into two categories:

1. Tunisia, Algeria, Morocco, Israel and Mauritania are considered "abolitionist in practice". Aside from Israel, all of the above countries maintain the death penalty for serious crimes such as drug-related offences and murder, however no executions have been carried out in a long time. The last Israeli execution was carried out in 1962 as they have retained capital punishment not for ordinary crimes but purely exceptional circumstances. In March 2026, Israel enacted a law mandating the death penalty for terrorism-related murder convictions in specified cases, a departure from this decades-long moratorium. The Association for Civil Rights in Israel (ACRI) petitioned the Supreme Court the same day to have the law struck down, arguing it is unconstitutional and discriminatory.
2. All other countries in the Middle East execute prisoners for crimes including "ordinary crimes". In the de facto autonomous Rojava federation in Syria, formed during the Syrian Civil War, capital punishment has been abolished.

The death penalty has proven difficult to eradicate in the Middle East due largely to many countries’ legal systems being based around religion, which is more “resistant to change than systems based solely on legislation”. In most countries in the Middle Eastern region, the legal system is largely based primarily on Shari'a. However, Israel's legal system has different sources. In criminal law determined by Shari'a, most crimes classified as Hudud are punishable by death and are considered dangerous for Islamic society. Their punishments are fixed in the Quran and the Hadith. They include adultery, apostasy, armed robbery and rebellion. In 2012, Iran cemented its lead position in the region with two executions per day and Iran continues to execute juvenile prisoners despite its international obligations. According to studies undertaken by Amnesty International in 2015, at least 1,196 executions were carried out in eight Middle Eastern countries – “a rise of 26% from the 945 executions recorded in eight countries in 2014”. “Iran alone accounted for 82% of all recorded executions in the region and Saudi Arabia executed at least 158 people – a 76% increase on 2014 and the highest number recorded for Saudi Arabia since 1995”.

Capital punishment represents the most dramatic clash between a ‘UN-sponsored’ human rights concept and Shari'a law. Shari'a establishes the death penalty as mandatory punishment for a number of Hudud crimes. “Moreover, some execution methods envisaged in the holy texts, such as flogging, stoning and amputation, violate international conventions that prohibit torture and cruel and inhuman treatments.” The Second Optional Protocol to the International Covenant on Civil and Political Rights (ICCPR), aimed at abolishing the death penalty, was adopted by the UN General Assembly in 1989. Article 1 of the Protocol states that all the Protocol's Parties shall refrain from carrying out executions and shall take all necessary measures to abolish the death penalty within their jurisdiction. None of the countries in the Middle Eastern region have ratified this protocol, although most have signed and ratified the ICCPR.

=== Freedom of religion ===
In Egypt, the Constitutional Declaration of March 2011 and the new constitution ratified on December 22, 2011 provide for some freedom of religion, but certain constitutional provisions, laws, and government policies and practices limit that freedom.

In Saudi Arabia, freedom of religion is neither recognized nor protected under the law. Sunni Islam is the official religion according to the 1992 Basic Law and the Qur'an and the Sunna are Saudi Arabia's constitution. Besides mosques, there are also no churches or other places of worship in Saudi Arabia. It is the only country in the world to ban them.

Kuwait's Constitution allows for religious freedom however this is not often put into practice. The government generally enforces the restrictions on freedom of religion established by other laws and policies. Sharia (Islamic law) is the core source of legislation and Islam is the state religion. Both Iraq and Lebanon's governments generally respect religious freedom. It is protected in the constitution and various other laws. In Lebanon “The constitution declares equality of rights and duties for all citizens without discrimination or preference but establishes a balance of power among the major religious groups.” In Iraq, Islam is considered the official religion. The constitution instructs that Islam be considered the main source of legislation, and declares that no law may be enacted that contradicts the “established provisions of Islam.”

The Constitution of Rojava, the de facto autonomous Federation of Northern Syria – Rojava in Syria formed during the Syrian Civil War, guarantees freedom of religion.

=== Freedom of speech ===
Free speech has been largely censored in the Middle East for years, by the means of suppression/removal of online content, spying of dissidents, activists, or journalists, critical of their government, and arbitrary detention. In January 2021, among several governments, governments of Middle Eastern countries were called out for misusing the protection guideline for public health to suppress free speech and activism in the region. The countries included Egypt, Bahrain, Kuwait, Iran, Saudi Arabia, Morocco, UAE, and Tunisia. According to media reports of a massive expose into the use of Israeli spyware technology by authoritarian regimes, the list of governmental clients of the NSO Group’s Pegasus software included a number of Middle East nations such as Bahrain, the United Arab Emirates, and Saudi Arabia. Reportedly, human rights activists, lawyers, and journalists were globally targeted with the phone malware application sold to these governments. A list of more than 50,000 phone numbers belonging to the people of interest to the client(s) of the company was found on the software. The NSO Group denied any wrongdoing in the case. The malicious software was said to have infected the targeted mobile phones with Android or Apple operating systems, to extract personal user data such as photos, messages, emails, call records, and allowed the secret activation of cameras and microphones of the device for real-time spying. Allegedly, the devices of the people close to the assassinated Saudi journalist, Jamal Khashoggi, including his fiancée, were also targeted via the software.

=== Status of women ===
==== Employment ====
Women throughout the Middle East earn less than men although there are labour laws in place that dictate equal opportunities for promotion and training and equal pay for the same type of work. These labour laws are frequently violated in regards to not only salary but also benefits such as loans for senior officials or housing allowances. Women in most countries throughout the Middle East can file complaints of discrimination with government agencies but these are often ineffective due to their inability to effectively investigate discrimination cases or impose penalties for employers who violate the labour laws.

In many countries in the region, labour laws prohibit women from undertaking arduous or dangerous work, or work which could be deemed “detrimental to their health or morals”. Women are prohibited from working at night, with the exception of those employed in medicine and a few other fields. Although these provisions are seen locally as a means of protecting women, in effect they “treat women as minors who are unable to make decisions regarding their own safety and hold women’s guardians responsible if the rules are violated.”.

==== Driving ====
Women in Saudi Arabia were not allowed to drive, even if they had a licence from another country. Many women were fined or jailed for defying these bans. This was changed in 2017 when women were allowed to apply for a Saudi licence.

==== Education ====
Education has been an important area of advancement for women in the region, and is a significant path for their advancement toward wider equality. Since the 1990s, women in the region have made advances in access to literacy, education, university enrolment, and the range of subjects of study available to them. In Saudi Arabia, for example, three educational institutions started to permit women to study law in 2007. However, they remain prohibited from serving as lawyers and judges in court and are only allowed to act as legal consultants to other women. Despite these improvements, there are still many barriers to gender equality in education. In majority countries studied, universities largely remain segregated by gender. In Saudi Arabia, for example, the number and diversity of classes offered to men are much greater than those available to women.

==== Domestic abuse ====
No country in the region (with the sole exception of the de facto autonomous Rojava federation in Syria) offers specific protections against spousal rape or domestic violence however physical abuse is generally prohibited. There is a lack of official protection of rights within the home and a lack of government accountability in these regions. It is believed that most domestic violence is typically covered up and kept within the family as many women in the region feel they cannot discuss their abuse without damaging their own and their family's reputation and honour. Abused women rarely attempt to file complaints with police and when they do they frequently encounter officers who are “reluctant to get involved in what is perceived as a family matter and who encourage reconciliation rather than legal action. In Saudi Arabia in particular, guardianship laws make it very difficult for battered wives to find a safe haven.”.

=== Children's rights ===
All the states in the Middle East region have ratified the United Nations Convention on the Rights of the Child (CRC). Following the ratification of the CRC, Middle Eastern countries have enacted or proposed to enact laws to protect children from violence, abuse, neglect or exploitation. A number of countries have put in place comprehensive Child Laws that bring together legal provisions for the protection of the child. Egypt, pre 2011 revolution, had been making progress in education, access to vaccines and sanitized water for children. Child labour, violence against girls, gender gaps within education and socioeconomic conditions had continued to be identified as areas of concern. Today, child arrests, detention and imprisonment continue to be a protection risk for children in Egypt. In the second half of 2013, UNICEF estimated that 400 children wound up arrested in connection with political turmoil. Founded in 2000, the Egyptian Foundation for Advancement of Childhood Conditions (EFACC), advocates against children's abuse and exploitation, advances protections for those in conflict with the law and promotes children's welfare. EFACC also provides free legal aid to children in trouble. Both external and internal conflict, ongoing political instability and the Syrian refugee crisis remain grave dangers for children in Iraq. The escalating armed conflict with the Islamic State of Iraq and the Levant (ISIL) has placed more children in peril. Multiple aspects of children's lives are at high risk especially child labour, education, shelter, sexual violence and child recruitment. . Founded in 2005, South Youth Organization (SYO) raises awareness of human rights and works to achieve greater protections for them. SYO exposes and documents grave violations against children, focusing specifically on discrimination issues and sectarian violence .

In some areas of the Middle East, child camel jockeys were used; a lot of these children were from other countries and were malnourished. All this was changed and the practice was made illegal.

In Egypt, the military was accused by the UK-based Sinai Human Rights Foundation (SFHR) of jeopardizing children's right to education during its campaign against militants in North Sinai. Egyptian forces occupied and turned 37 schools into military bases. Following the take over, the government was unable to properly relocate the children. Students were left without access to education, while the illiteracy levels increased. Clashes between the army and armed groups also destroyed 59 schools, three of which were reportedly attacked or destroyed by militants.

=== Prisoner rights ===
A fact-finding panel from the UK, chaired by Crispin Blunt, revealed that Saudi Arabia was keeping former Crown Prince Mohammed Bin Nayef and King Salman’s brother Prince Ahmed Bin Abdulaziz under arbitrary detention. Also, the country denied these individuals access to their lawyers, doctors and family members. In December 2020, a group of British members of parliament urged the UK and other nations to stop any to Saudi Arabia. Citing the “gravely concerning allegations” about human rights abuses in Saudi prisons, the panel also asked them to impose Magnitsky-style sanctions on the country's officials.

Saudi Arabia was accused of detaining hundreds of African migrants, especially Ethiopian migrants, in filthy conditions, since October 2020. Reports by the Human Rights Watch informed that more than 350 migrants were being kept in small rooms of a detention center in Riyadh. Interviews of some of the migrants revealed than many of them are tortured and beaten by the guards, using rubber-coated metal rods. Details further highlighted that no measures were taken inside the centers to control the spread of COVID-19, despite some of the detainees having symptoms of the virus.

The EU Special Representative for Human Rights highlighted the cases of Bahraini prisoners Hassan Mushaima, Abdulhadi al-Khawaja, and Abduljalil al-Singace for its early 2021 human rights dialogue with Bahraini authorities. The EU has systematically raised concerns to the Bahraini authorities demanding the prohibition of torture on prisoners, their right to a fair trial, freedom of expression and association, arbitrary detentions, and mass trials.

The Mairie de Paris, as the oldest partner in the Paris FC, was called to end all support for the Bahraini government; a 20% shareholder in the club in February 2021. The decision was asked to be made during the vote on renewing the yearly subvention the City of Paris allocates to the Paris Club. Several non-profit organizations based in Paris, including ADHRB, called for the City of Paris to hold a dialogue on the abuse of human rights and the death penalty practiced in the Kingdom of Bahrain. The Council of Paris accused Bahrain of misusing soccer for ‘Sport-Whitewashing’ its human rights abuses. The Council demanded the release of detainees put on death row.

A small island in the Middle East, Bahrain faces frequent condemnation from the human rights organizations over the conditions of its prisons. Overcrowding, lack of medical care and poor sanitation were reasons believed to cause threatening situation in the prisons, during the COVID-19 pandemic. In April 2021, the human rights activists in Bahrain said that under a security operation, prisoners in the Jaw prison were being beaten. While inmates were protesting the prison conditions inside, their families held small protests outside demanding their release and better prison conditions. Bahrain's agency in charge of prisons described the use of excessive force as a response to disobedience.

In a press briefing released on 30 April 2021, the spokesperson for the United Nations High Commissioner for Human Rights, Marta Hurtado, expressed being disturbed by the unnecessary and undue physical force used by Bahraini special forces against prisoners during a peaceful sit-in inside its Jau prison on 17 April 2021. As per several eyewitnesses of the event, the special forces subjected the prisoners to beating on the heads, severe injury, followed by throwing stun grenades at them. The incident took place when the inmates were protesting the poor conditions inside the prison and lack of medical treatment. The UNHCR called on Bahraini authorities to consider releasing more prisoners detained at the Jau prison to ease the congestion faced inside and decrease the risk of further spreading COVID-19 throughout the population inside the prison.

Kameel Juma Hasan was imprisoned for alleged participation in ‘unlawful’ demonstrations, critical of the government of Bahrain. The act is being considered a violation of human rights by Amnesty International, as even though Kameel was first charged with the said allegations at the age of 14, he did not receive any of the procedural benefits falling under Bahrain’s new juvenile-justice law. Moreover, as per the statements provided by Kameel’s family, he had been subjected to beating and forced standing for long hours, after being transferred to the Royal Academy of Police post his detention.

The ADHRB, a human rights support organization reported in early August 2021 the worsening condition of a 22-year-old Bahraini national, Mustafa Abdulkarim Khatam, due to being subjected to torture during interrogation inside the prison. Mustafa was allegedly interrogated for nine days and subjected to psychological as well as physical forms of torture, including, verbal and physical insults, lashing, beatings, suspension, prevention of basic activities like sleeping, eating, using the bathroom, or sitting. Mustafa’s lawyer was reportedly prevented from attending the interrogations and as of 5 August 2021, he was not provided the urgent medical treatment required to stabilize his worsening condition at the time.

== Regional human rights initiatives ==
Several cross-regional programmes and initiatives are supporting Human Rights today, including:

- The Arab Commission for Human Rights (unrelated to the inter-governmental Arab Commission on Human Rights) was created in 1998 by 15 human rights activists, including Haytham Manna from Syria, Moncef Marzouki from Tunisia, and others from Egypt and other Arab world countries.
- The Coalition of Arab Cities against Racism, Discrimination, Xenophobia and Intolerance was launched in 2008, in Casablanca, Morocco. It is part of the International Coalition of Inclusive and Sustainable Cities (ICCAR), an initiative launched by UNESCO in March 2004. These regional coalitions seek to establish a network of cities interested in sharing experiences in order to improve their policies to fight racism, discrimination, xenophobia and exclusion.
- The Arabic Network for Human Rights Information, an NGO based in Egypt that collects publications, campaigns, reports, and statements from almost 140 Arabic human rights organizations across the region and republishes them in a daily digest.
- The Arab Master's in Democracy and Human Rights was created in 2015 with the support of the European Union. It groups together several universities from across the Arab Region (Jordan, Lebanon, Palestine, Morocco, and Tunisia) in joint activities, including a specialised master's programme with theoretical, practical and critical features.

== By country ==
See the following for more details on each country:

== See also ==
- Human rights in Africa
- Human rights in East Asia
- Human rights in Central Asia
- Human rights in Europe
- Human rights in China
- Human rights in Muslim-majority countries
- Human rights in the United States
- Xenophobia and racism in the Middle East
- Timeline of first women's suffrage in majority-Muslim countries
- Human trafficking in the Middle East
- Democracy in the Middle East
- Judaism and slavery
- Jewish terrorism
- LGBT in the Middle East
  - Sexual taboo in the Middle East
- Abduction of Syrian children and the role of Western charity organizations
