= Human trafficking in Algeria =

Algeria ratified the 2000 UN TIP (trafficking in persons) Protocol in March 2004.

Algeria is a transit and, to a lesser extent, destination country for men and women subjected to trafficking in persons, specifically forced labor and forced prostitution. Most commonly, sub-Saharan African men and women enter Algeria voluntarily but illegally, often with the assistance of smugglers, for the purpose of traveling to Europe. Some become victims of trafficking: men may be forced into unskilled labor and women into prostitution to repay smuggling debts. Criminal networks of sub-Saharan nationals in southern Algeria facilitate this irregular migration by arranging transportation, forged documents, and promises of employment. Reliable statistics on the number of potential victims are not available from the government or non-governmental organizations (NGOs). One NGO estimates that the populations most vulnerable to trafficking include between 10,000 and 15,000 illegal sub-Saharan African migrants.

In 2010 the government helped formulate a training program for police, judges, and prosecutors on its counter-trafficking law. Despite these efforts, the government did not show overall progress in punishing trafficking crimes and protecting trafficking victims and continued to lack adequate prevention and protection measures. Although the Government of Algeria has made efforts to fix the issue, they have not been significant.

The U.S. State Department's Office to Monitor and Combat Trafficking in Persons placed the country in the "Tier 2 Watchlist" in 2017. Algeria remained at Tier 3 in 2023.

In 2023, the Organised Crime Index gave the country a score of 4 out of 10 for human trafficking, noting increased numbers of investigations and prosecutions.

== Prosecution ==
The Algerian government made minimal efforts to address human trafficking through investigations, prosecutions, or convictions during the reporting period. Algeria prohibits all forms of trafficking under Section 5 of its criminal code. In March 2009, the government enacted a comprehensive anti-trafficking statute; prescribed penalties range from three to ten years’ imprisonment, which can be increased to 20 years if certain aggravating circumstances are found. These penalties are sufficiently stringent and commensurate with those prescribed under Algerian law for other serious crimes, such as rape. The government did not report investigating or prosecuting any trafficking offenses, or convicting or punishing any trafficking offenders during the year. The Ministry of Justice, in seminars on amendments to the criminal code, briefed judges and prosecutors on Algeria’s anti-trafficking law.

After the Algerian government failed to make any significant efforts over a long period of time, the Prime Minister adopted the Government's National Action Plan for Combating Human Trafficking for 2019-2021 and sensitized law enforcement agencies and other government institutions to trafficking issues. Algeria therefore remains on the Level 2 watch list for the third consecutive year. In 2017, 26 cases of human trafficking were investigated, 22 prosecuted and 14 convicted. In 2018, 16 alleged offenders were prosecuted by the government and 9 human traffickers were convicted.

== Protection ==
In 2010 the Government of Algeria made no discernible progress in protecting victims of trafficking over the last year. It did not demonstrate development or use of systematic procedures for the identification of trafficking victims among vulnerable populations, such as foreign women arrested for prostitution or illegal migrants. Victims therefore remained at risk of detention for unlawful acts committed as a result of being trafficked. According to local NGOs, the government did not provide specialized training to government officials in recognizing trafficking or in dealing with victims of trafficking. The government did not provide foreign victims with legal alternatives to their removal to countries where they faced hardship or retribution. The government did not provide medical, counseling, or legal services to victims, nor did it refer victims to other service providers. However, government-operated health clinics that provide emergency care to crime victims were available for victims of trafficking. There is no formal program to encourage trafficking victims to assist with investigation and prosecution of offenders.

== Prevention ==
The Algerian government made minimal prevention efforts during the reporting period. The government convened regional police chiefs in Algiers for a meeting with foreign officials in February 2010 to develop a long-term training plan on transnational crime, including trafficking in persons. Algeria hosted a meeting in March 2010 of Sahel-region foreign ministers to coordinate joint action against transnational crime, including trafficking in persons. The government did not conduct a public awareness campaign on trafficking in persons. It did not have a formal anti-trafficking policy or a national plan of action to complement its anti-trafficking law.

== See also ==
- Slavery in Algeria
