= Censorship in Algeria =

The working conditions of journalists in Algeria have evolved since the 1962 independence. After 1990, the Code of Press was suppressed, allowing for greater freedom of press. However, with the civil war in the 1990s, more than 70 journalists were assassinated by terrorists. Sixty journalists were killed between 1993 and 1998 in Algeria.

== 1990s-2000s ==
In the 1990s to the 2000s, President Abdelaziz Bouteflika ordered several newspaper closures, imprisoned journalists such as Mohammad Benchicou, director of Le Matin and author of a critical biography of Bouteflika, and forced other reporters into exile, mostly in France.

Reporters Without Borders's (RSF in French) index for freedom of press gives approximatively 40 for Algeria since five years (although the figure has increased, signifying a lesser freedom of press). Along with L'Humanité newspaper, RSF did denounce the imprisonment of Mohammad Benchicou, director of Le Matin, who was sentenced to two years in prison for denouncing corruption in Algeria. Benchicou was awarded in 2006 the PEN/Barbara Goldsmith Freedom to Write Award.

Algeria continued to experience many attacks on freedom of press, apart from Mohammad Benchicou's imprisonment. The La Tribune newspaper was closed in 1996 and the Sam blog was censored in March 2006. El Watan also suffered from attacks from the Algerian state in 1998. Its reporters had, according to RSF and the Committee to Protect Journalists (CPJ), been targeted by both government forces and Islamist insurgents. Journalists from Liberté and from Le Matin were forced into exile in France.

== February 2007 symposium on disappearances ==
The authorities blocked on February 7, 2007, a symposium titled "Pour la Vérité, la Paix et la Conciliation" (For Truth, Peace and Conciliation) organised by the CFDA (Collectif des familles de disparus en Algérie, Collective of the Families of Disappeared People in Algeria), SOS Disparus, Djazairouna, the ANFD (Association nationale des familles de disparus) and Somoud. This new form of censorship on a conference concerning the "disappearances" which occurred during the civil war in the 1990s has been criticized by the ACAT-France (Action des Chrétiens pour l'abolition de la torture), the International Federation of Human Rights (IFHR), and the World Organization Against Torture (WOAT). Furthermore, critics of the controversial Charter for Peace and National Reconciliation, adopted on September 29, 2006, have been targeted by the authorities, who use various methods of intimidation, including lawsuits, on lawyers and human rights defenders.

== 2020s ==
In April 2020, El País reported that the authorities had blocked the websites Maghreb Emergent and Radio M, which had been critical of the regime. Journalist Khaled Drareni who worked for Radio M and reported on the 2019–2020 Algerian protests was arrested. On June 13, 2021, the Algerian Ministry of Communication decided to rescind the media accreditation of well-known French news channel France 24.

Some subjects are de facto taboo, hence according to RSF "Simply mentioning corruption or the crushing of demonstrations can invite threats and police interrogation".

On August 13th, 2023, the movie Barbie was forbidden from screening in Algerian cinema theaters for “ disrespecting the values of Algerian society “.

In 2024, the country is ranked 139 out of 180 by reporters without borders.

== See also ==
- Hate speech laws in Algeria
- History of Algeria
- Politics of Algeria
- Freedom of expression in Algeria
- Human rights in Algeria
