= Arab Charter on Human Rights =

2004 multinational agreement

The Arab Charter on Human Rights (ACHR), adopted by the Council of the League of Arab States on 22 May 2004, affirms the principles contained in the UN Charter, the Universal Declaration of Human Rights, the International Covenants on Human Rights and the Cairo Declaration on Human Rights in Islam. It provides for a number of traditional human rights, including the right to liberty and security of persons, equality of persons before the law, protection of persons from torture, the right to own private property, freedom to practice religious observance and freedom of peaceful assembly and association. The Charter also provides for the election of a seven-person Committee of Experts on Human Rights to consider states' reports.

A first version of the Charter was created on 15 September 1994, but no state ratified it. The updated (2004) version of the Charter came into force in 2008 after seven of the members of the League of Arab States had ratified it.

On 24 January 2008, then UN High Commissioner for Human Rights Louise Arbour said the Arab charter was incompatible with the UN's understanding of universal human rights, including with respect to women's rights and capital punishment for children, in addition to other provisions in the Charter. The charter is listed on the website of her office, among texts adopted by international groups aimed at promoting and consolidating democracy.

As of November 2013 the Charter had been ratified by Algeria, Bahrain, Iraq, Jordan, Kuwait, Lebanon, Libya, Palestine, Qatar, Saudi Arabia, Syria, the UAE and Yemen. The Charter was criticized for setting human rights standards in the region below the internationally recognized regime.

In 2014 Arab League states elaborated an additional treaty - the Statute of the Arab Court of Human Rights, - to allow inter-state litigation concerning violations of the Charter. The statute will enter into force after 7 ratifications. The first country to ratify it was Saudi Arabia in 2016.

== See also ==
- Human rights
- Human rights in the Middle East
