= List of diplomatic missions in Algeria =

This is a list of diplomatic missions in Algeria. There are currently 98 embassies and a Delegation of the European Commission in Algiers, and many countries maintain consulates in other Algerian cities (not including honorary consulates).

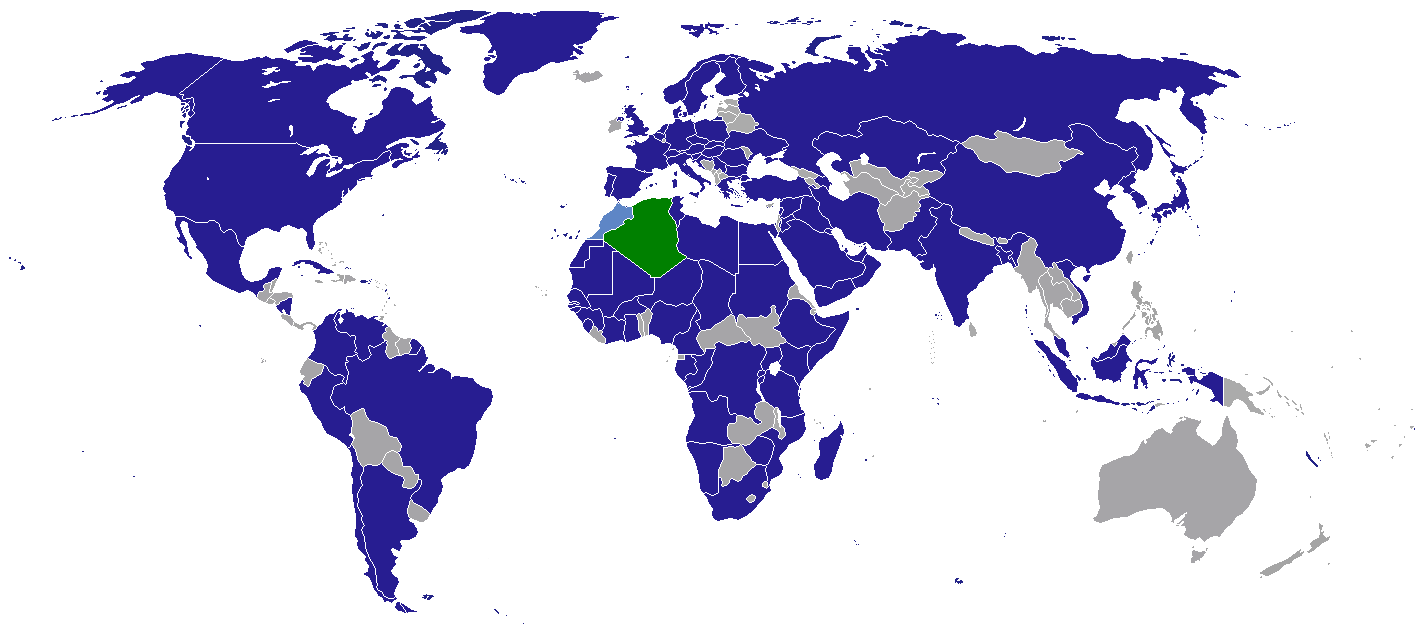
Map of diplomatic missions in Algeria

== Diplomatic missions in Algiers ==
=== Embassies ===
1. Angola
2. Argentina
3. Austria
4. Azerbaijan
5. Bahrain
6. Bangladesh
7. Belgium
8. Brazil
9. Bulgaria
10. Burkina Faso
11. Burundi
12. Cameroon
13. Canada
14. Chad
15. Chile
16. China
17. Colombia
18. Congo-Brazzaville
19. Congo-Kinshasa
20. Croatia
21. Cuba
22. Czech Republic
23. Denmark
24. Egypt
25. Ethiopia
26. Finland
27. France
28. Gabon
29. Gambia
30. Germany
31. Ghana
32. Greece
33. Guinea
34. Guinea-Bissau
35. Holy See
36. Hungary
37. India
38. Indonesia
39. Iran
40. Iraq
41. Italy
42. Ivory Coast
43. Japan
44. Jordan
45. Kazakhstan
46. Kenya
47. Kuwait
48. Lebanon
49. Libya
50. Madagascar
51. Malaysia
52. Mali
53. Mauritania
54. Mexico
55. Mozambique
56. Namibia
57. Netherlands
58. Nicaragua
59. Niger
60. Nigeria
61. North Korea
62. Norway
63. Oman
64. Pakistan
65. Palestine
66. Peru
67. Poland
68. Portugal
69. Qatar
70. Romania
71. Russia
72. Rwanda
73. Sahrawi Republic
74. Saudi Arabia
75. Senegal
76. Serbia
77. Sierra Leone
78. Slovakia
79. Slovenia
80. Somalia
81. South Africa
82. South Korea
83. Spain
84. Sudan
85. Sweden
86. Switzerland
87. Syria
88. Tanzania
89. Tunisia
90. Turkey
91. Uganda
92. Ukraine
93. United Kingdom
94. United States
95. Venezuela
96. Vietnam
97. Yemen
98. Zimbabwe

=== Other missions or delegations ===
1. European Union (Delegation)

== Gallery ==
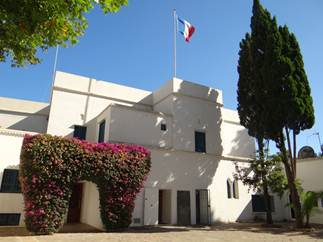
Embassy of France

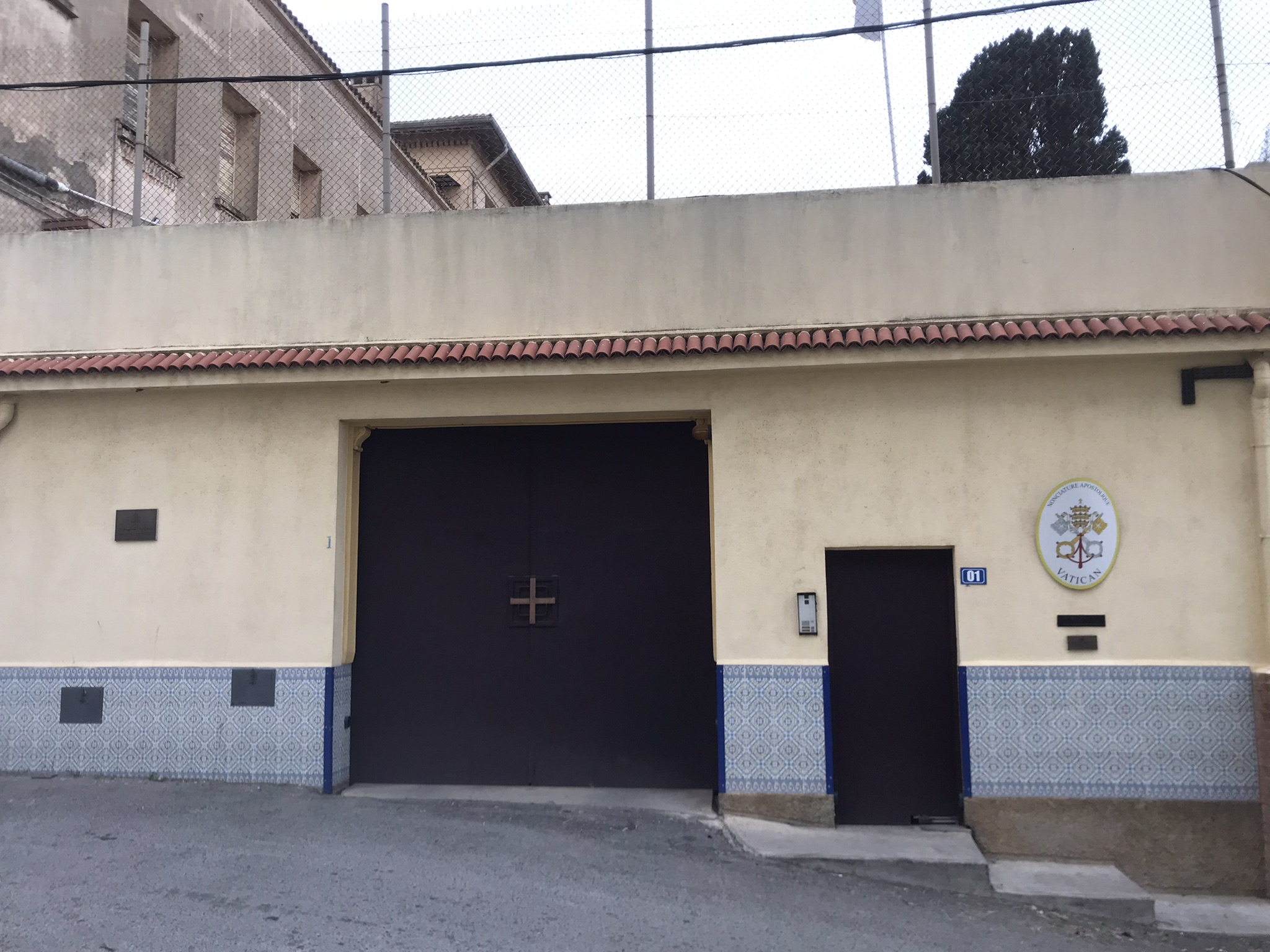
Apostolic Nunciature of the Holy See

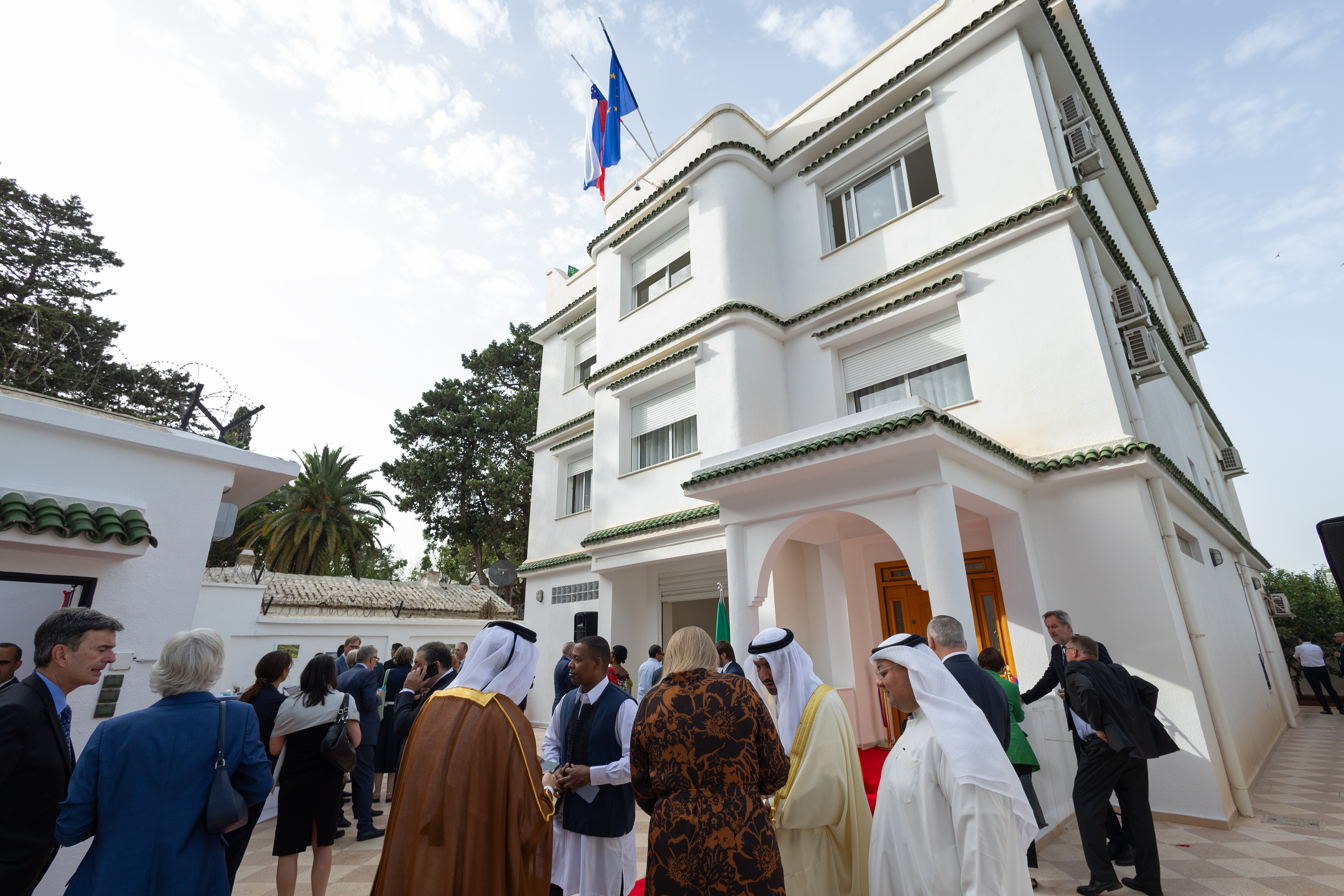
Embassy of Slovenia

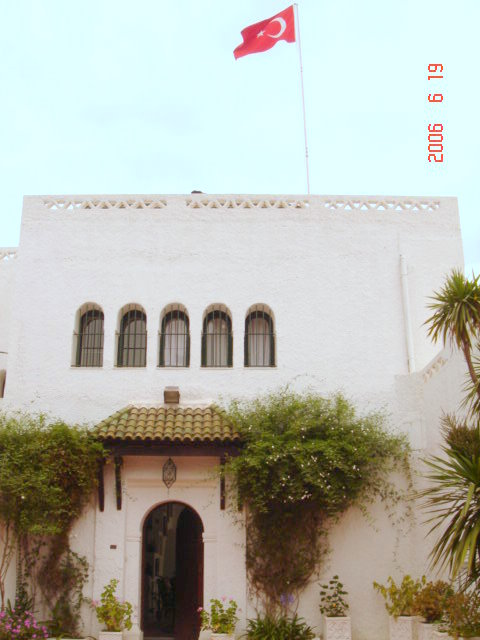
Embassy of Turkey

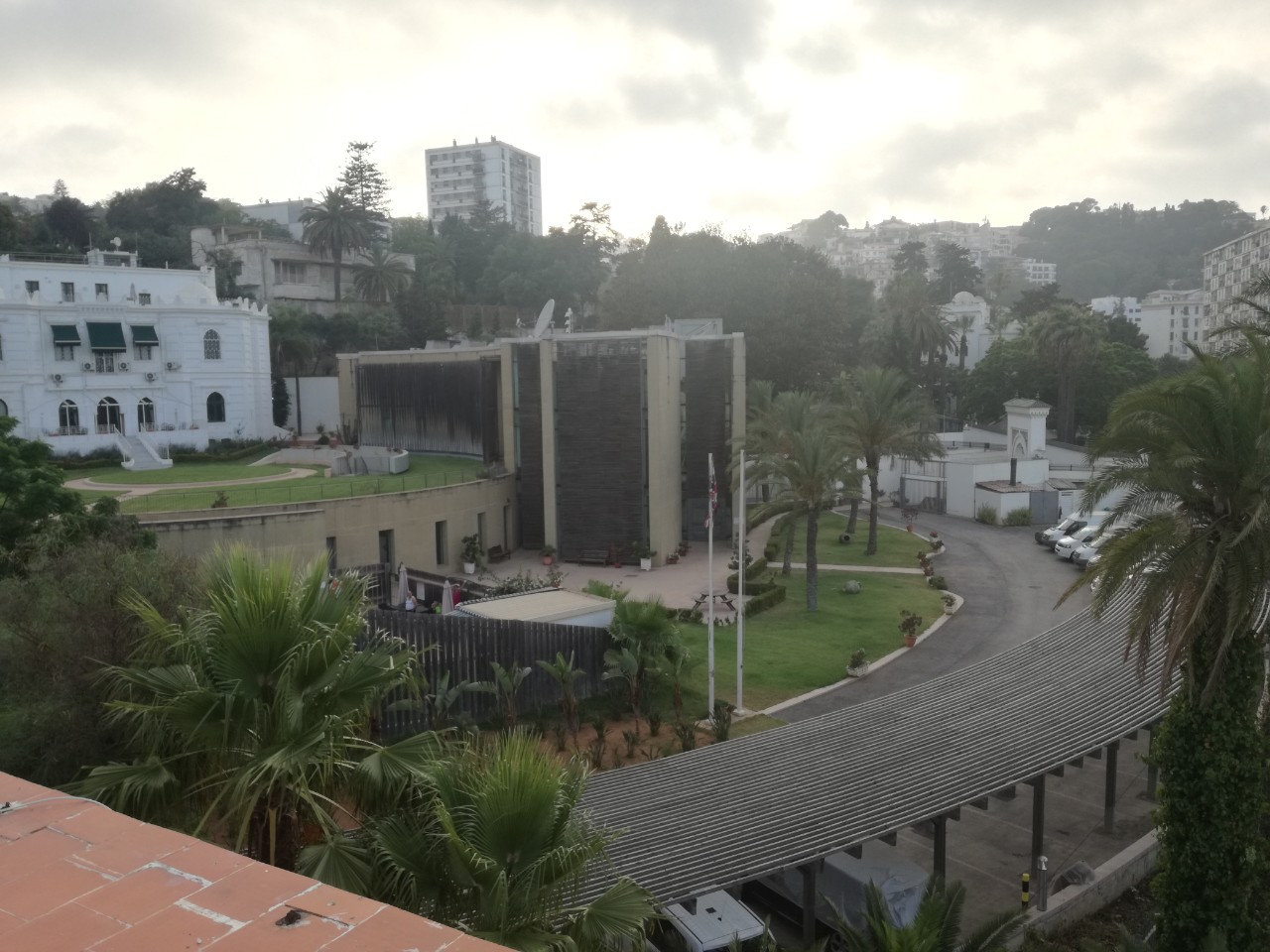
Embassy of United Kingdom

== Consular missions ==
=== Algiers ===
- Malta

=== Annaba ===
- France
- Tunisia (Consulate)

=== Oran ===
- France
- Morocco (Consulate-General)
- Spain (Consulate-General)
- Turkey (Consulate-General)

=== Sidi Bel Abbès ===
- Morocco (Consulate-General)

=== Tamanrasset ===
- Mali
- Niger

=== Tébessa ===
- Tunisia (Consulate)

== Non-resident embassies ==
=== Resident in Paris ===
- Afghanistan
- Australia
- Bolivia
- Bosnia and Herzegovina
- Costa Rica
- Ecuador
- Guatemala
- Haiti
- Honduras
- Iceland
- Jamaica
- Laos
- Panama
- Thailand
- Taiwan
- Uruguay
- Uzbekistan
- Vanuatu
- Zambia

=== Resident in Cairo ===
- Armenia
- Belarus
- Brunei
- Cambodia
- Mongolia
- Myanmar
- Nepal
- New Zealand
- Singapore
- South Sudan
- Uzbekistan

=== Resident in London ===
- Dominica
- Grenada
- Papua New Guinea
- Saint Kitts and Nevis
- Saint Lucia
- Saint Vincent and the Grenadines

=== Resident in other cities ===
- Barbados (Dublin)
- Central African Republic (Brazzaville)
- Cyprus (Beirut)
- Equatorial Guinea (Tunis)
- Estonia (Madrid)
- Eswatini (Addis Ababa)
- Fiji (Abu Dhabi)
- Georgia (Madrid)
- Ireland (Bern)
- Kyrgyzstan (Kuwait City)
- Lesotho (Tripoli)
- Lithuania (Brussels)
- Maldives (Geneva)
- Malta (Valletta)
- Micronesia (New York City)
- Nauru (New York City)
- Paraguay (Lisbon)
- Philippines (Tripoli)
- Seychelles (Addis Ababa)
- Tajikistan (Riyadh)
- Togo (Rabat)
- Turkmenistan (Ankara)
- Trinidad & Tobago (Abuja)
- Timor-Leste (Lisbon)

== Closed missions ==
Host city	Sending country	Mission	Year closed	Ref.
Algiers	Albania	Embassy	Unknown	
Algiers	Australia	Embassy (Note: Resident in Paris, France)	1991	
Algiers	Benin	Embassy	2019	
Algiers	Ecuador	Embassy	2019	
Algiers	Morocco	Embassy	2021	
Algiers	United Arab Emirates	Embassy	2026	
Algiers	Uruguay	Embassy	1993	
Annaba	Italy	Consulate	2000	
Annaba	Libya	Consulate-General	1998	
Annaba	Russia	Consulate-General	2016	
Annaba	United States	Consulate	1944	
Constantine	France	Consulate-General	1991	
Constantine	United States	Consulate	1972	
Oran	Italy	Consulate	2000	
Oran	United States	Consulate	1993	

== See also ==
- Foreign relations of Algeria
- List of diplomatic missions of Algeria
- Visa policy of Algeria
- Visa requirements for Algerian citizens
