= Mustapha Salma Ould Sidi Mouloud =

Sahrawi police chief

Mustapha Salma Ould Sidi Mouloud (born 1968 in Smara) is a former Police chief of the Polisario Front, and political dissident.

He was abducted in 1979 and deported to Algeria. He studied physics, and Police officer school in Algiers in 1991.

In 2010, following a family visit to the Moroccan-controlled part of Western Sahara, he announced on August 9, he wanted to open dialogue within the POLISARIO, on the Moroccan autonomy initiative for settling the conflict in Western Sahara. On August 30, 2010, he attempted to return to the Tindouf camps crossing the highly militarized Moroccan wall. He was detained by Sahrawi People's Liberation Army troops on September 21 at the liberated territories, and accused of high treason.

M. Brahim Ghali, ambassador of the Sahrawi Arabic Democratic Republic in Algiers, described Mustapha Salma as a traitor.

On October 8, 2010, there was a protest about the disappearance at the Embassy of Algeria in Washington, D.C. In October 2010, there was a report of his release. In December 2010, he was released to the United Nations High Commissioner for Refugees at the Western Sahara-Mauritania border.

Since his release, Sidi Mouloud had stayed in Mauritania, not returning to Morocco or the Western Sahara, and he had not made any declaration.
