= Visa policy of Algeria =

Policy on permits required to enter Algeria

Visitors to Algeria must obtain a visa from one of the Algerian diplomatic missions or on arrival from organized tours unless they are citizens from one of the visa-exempt countries.

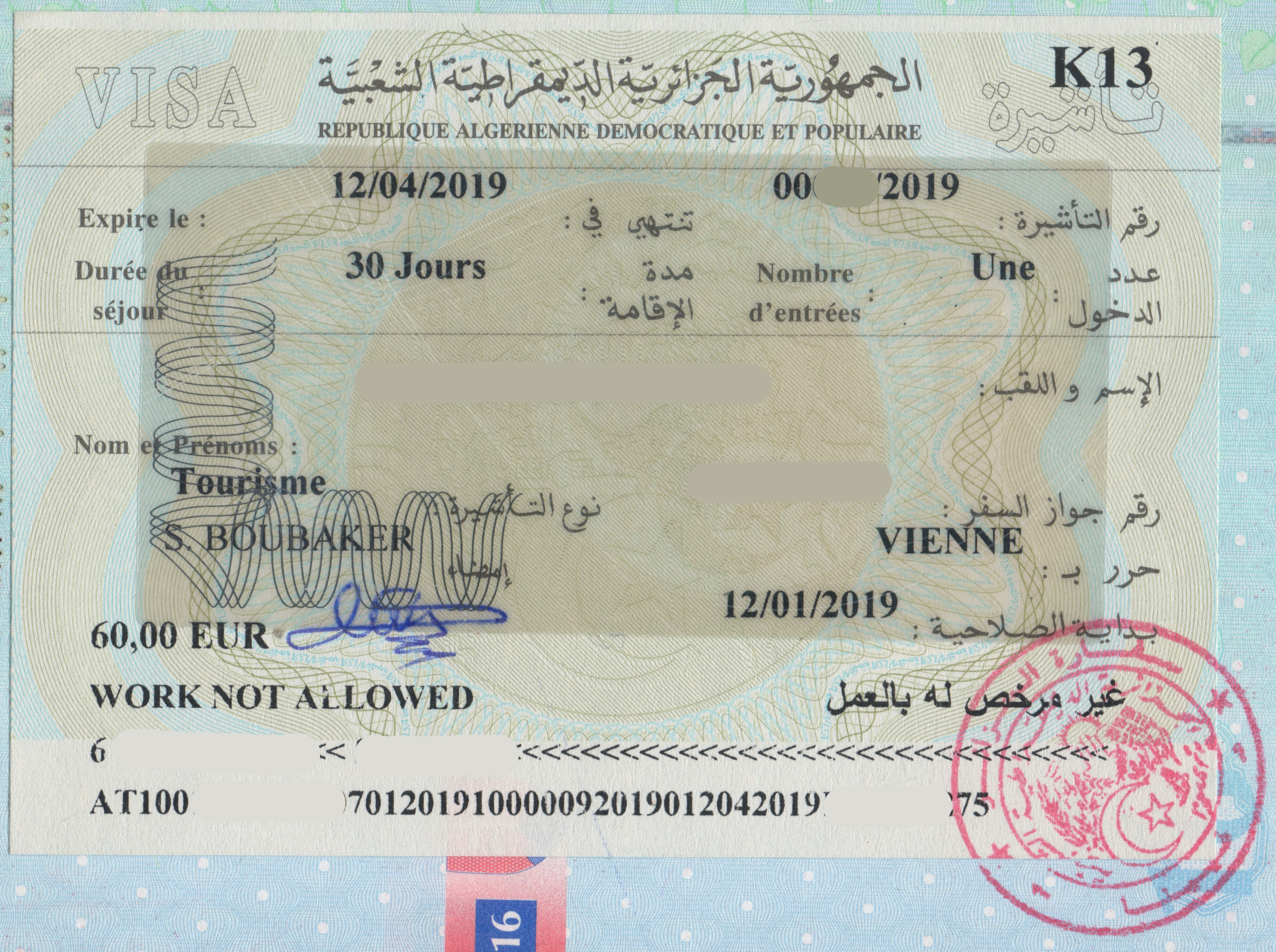
Algerian visa

All visitors must have a passport valid for at least 6 months from the date of arrival.

== Visa policy map ==
Visa policy of Algeria Algeria Visa not required (3 months) Visa not required (14 days) Visa required Admission refused

== Visa exemption ==
=== Ordinary passports ===
Citizens of the following countries as well as refugees and stateless persons residing in these countries may enter Algeria without a visa for the following period:

3 months

- Libya
- Malaysia
- Mali
- Mauritania
- Sahrawi Arab Democratic Republic
- Seychelles
- Tunisia

14 days

- Hong Kong

Date of visa changes
- 25 November 2025: Hong Kong

Cancelled:

- Unknown: Maldives
- N/A: Argentina
- October 2014: Syria
- 23 March 2016: Yemen
- 26 September 2024: Morocco

=== Non-ordinary passports ===
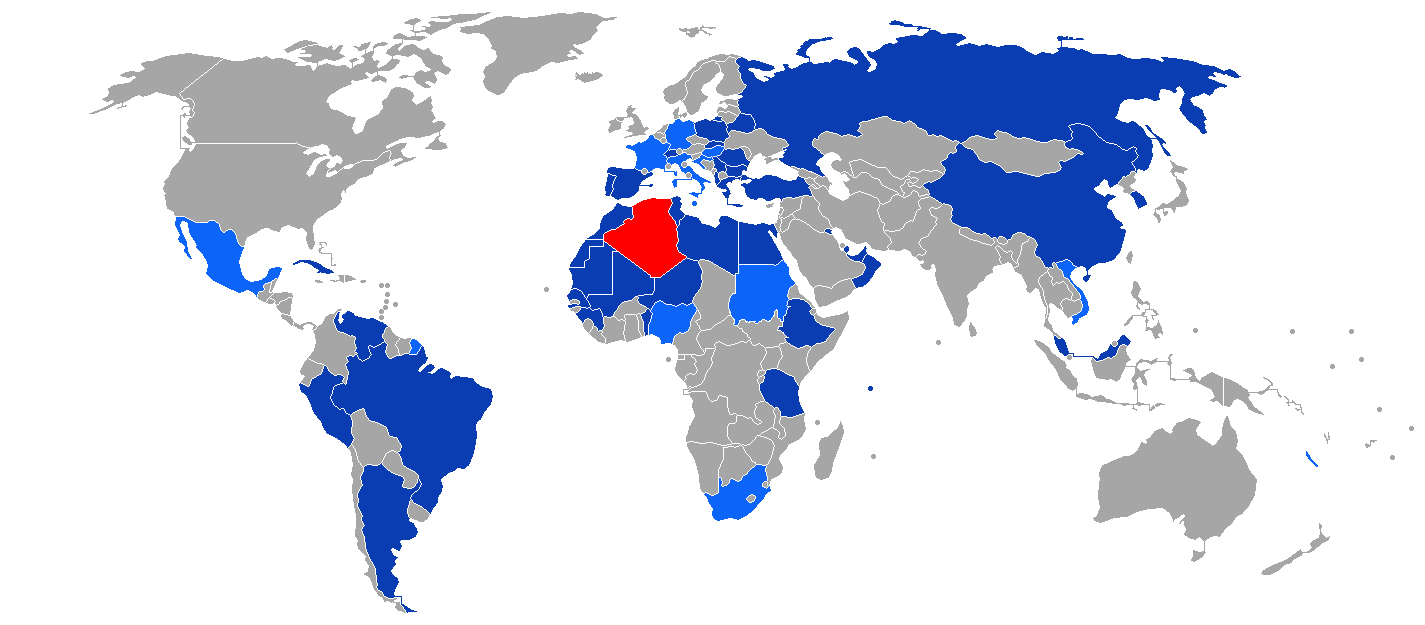
Visa policy of Algeria for holders of diplomatic and service passports Algeria Visa not required for holders of diplomatic or service category passports Visa not required for holders of diplomatic passports

In addition, holders of diplomatic or service passports of the following countries may enter Algeria without a visa (unless otherwise noted):

- Albania
- Argentina
- Belarus
- Benin
- Brazil
- Bulgaria
- China
- Croatia^{D}
- Cuba
- Egypt
- Ethiopia
- Germany^{D}
- Greece
- Guinea
- Hungary^{D}
- India
- Indonesia
- Italy^{D}
- Kuwait
- Malta^{D}
- Mexico^{D}
- Niger
- Nigeria^{D}
- Oman
- Peru
- Poland
- Portugal
- Romania
- Qatar
- Russia
- Rwanda
- Senegal
- Serbia
- Slovakia
- South Africa^{D}
- South Korea
- Spain
- Sudan^{D}
- Switzerland
- Tanzania
- Turkey
- United Arab Emirates
- Venezuela
- Vietnam^{D}

_{D - Diplomatic passports only.}

== Visa on arrival ==
Travelers arriving by cruise ship do not need to apply for a visa in advance. Their visas are processed on board the ship.

Travelers on tours organized by an approved travel agency may obtain a visa on arrival for up to 30 days. The itinerary must include one of these southern provinces: Adrar, Béchar, Béni Abbès, Biskra, Bordj Badji Mokhtar, Djanet, Djelfa, El Bayadh, El M'Ghair, El Menia, El Oued, Ghardaïa, Illizi, In Guezzam, In Salah, Laghouat, M'Sila, Naâma, Ouargla, Ouled Djellal, Tamanrasset, Timimoun, Tindouf, Touggourt. In December 2024, the government proposed expanding this provision to all provinces.

A number of countries are not eligible for the visa on arrival for southern Algeria and therefore must obtain visas from an embassy in advance of travel. Citizens of the following countries are not eligible:

- Afghanistan
- Bangladesh
- Iran
- Iraq
- Israel^{X}
- Laos
- Lebanon
- Myanmar
- North Korea
- Pakistan
- Palestine
- Somalia
- Sudan
- Syria
- Yemen

_{X - Admission refused}

== Visa application process ==
All non-visa-exempt citizens must apply for a visa before they travel to Algeria. Required documents vary, but at minimum all travellers must provide:

- Two completed copies of an application form
- Two passport-regulation photographs per form (for four in total)
- Two photocopies of every page in the applicant's passport
- The applicant's passport
- A justification for coming to Algeria
- Payment of the applicable fee, which is different depending on the visa applied for and the nationality of the applicant

Visas are currently issued for diplomacy, tourism, work, journalism, business visits, family reunification, cultural events, study, medical travel, and transit. The required documents differ, generally an invitation from an entity in Algeria is required. For tourist visas, a hotel booking is required, and for transit visas, proof of onward travel is required.

Additionally, travel insurance is required for citizens of the following countries, which determines the start date of the visa's validity:

- European Union member states (except Croatia, Cyprus and Ireland)
- Australia
- Canada
- Iceland
- New Zealand
- North Macedonia
- Norway
- Switzerland

== Entry restrictions ==
=== Morocco ===
Citizens of Morocco are required to obtain a visa prior to entry into Algeria, including those holding dual citizenship or another nationality.

=== Syria ===
Citizens of Syria are specifically required to show that they have sufficient funds to cover their stay in Algeria. They must show that they have at least €1,000 if they have an Algerian sponsor, and at least €4,000 if they do not.

== Israel ==
Entry and transit is refused to citizens of Israel, even if not leaving the aircraft and proceeding by the same flight.

== See also ==
- Visa requirements for Algerian citizens
