= List of diplomatic missions of Algeria =

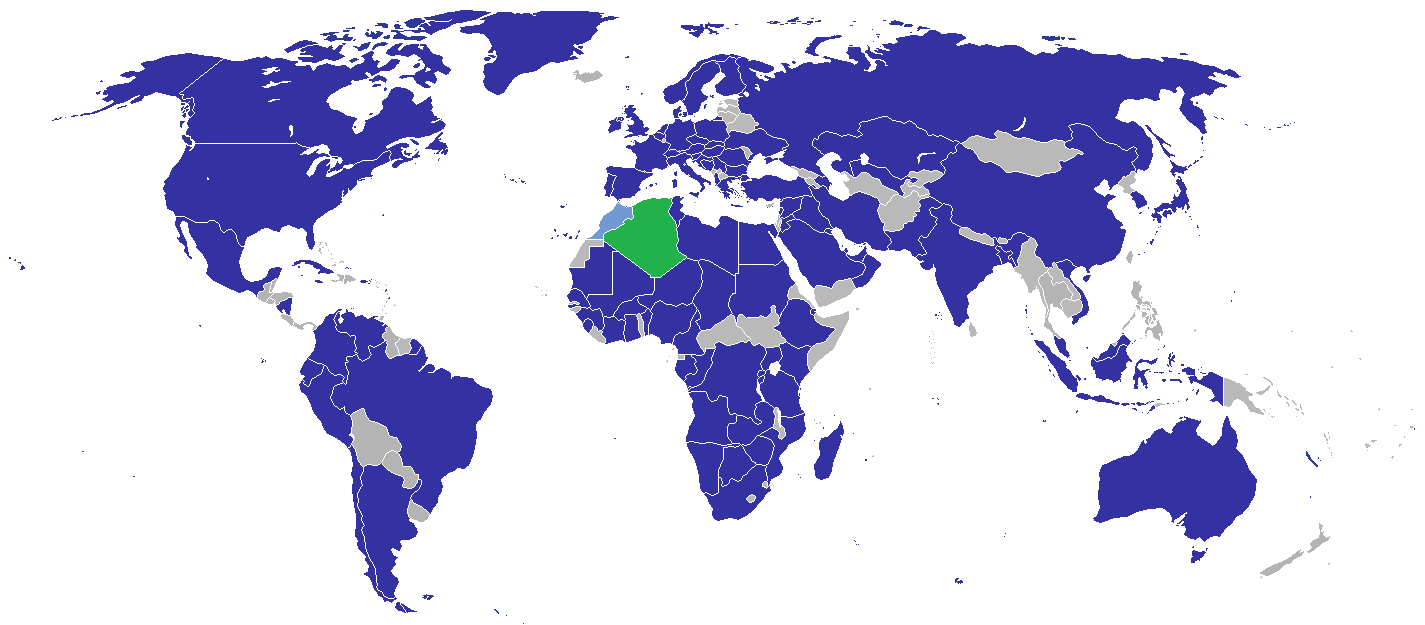
Map of Algerian diplomatic missions

This is a list of diplomatic missions of Algeria. Algeria has a significant presence worldwide, with particular focus on Africa, the Middle East, and its former colonizer France.

Honorary consulates and trade missions are excluded from this listing

== Current missions ==
=== Africa ===
Host country	Host city	Mission	Concurrent accreditation	Ref.
Angola	Luanda	Embassy	Countries: São Tomé and Príncipe	
Benin	Cotonou	Embassy		
Botswana	Gaborone	Embassy		
Burkina Faso	Ouagadougou	Embassy		
Burundi	Bujumbura	Embassy		
Cameroon	Yaoundé	Embassy		
Chad	N'Djamena	Embassy		
Congo-Brazzaville	Brazzaville	Embassy	Countries: Central African Republic	
Congo-Kinshasa	Kinshasa	Embassy		
Djibouti	Djibouti City	Embassy		
Egypt	Cairo	Embassy	Multilateral Organizations: Arab League	
Ethiopia	Addis Ababa	Embassy	Multilateral Organizations: African Union; United Nations Economic Commission for Africa	
Gabon	Libreville	Embassy	Countries: Equatorial Guinea	
Ghana	Accra	Embassy		
Guinea	Conakry	Embassy	Countries: Liberia	
Ivory Coast	Abidjan	Embassy		
Kenya	Nairobi	Embassy	Countries: South Sudan; Multilateral Organizations: United Nations; United Nations Environment Programme; United Nations Human Settlements Programme	
Libya	Tripoli	Embassy		
Libya	Sabha	Consulate		
Madagascar	Antananarivo	Embassy	Countries: Comoros; Mauritius; Seychelles	
Mali	Bamako	Embassy		
Mali	Gao	Consulate		
Mauritania	Nouakchott	Embassy		
Mauritania	Nouadhibou	Consulate		
Morocco (Note: Despite the severance of diplomatic relations between Algeria & Morocco in August 2021, consular relations still remain. As such, the Algerian consular missions in Morocco continue to operate.)	Casablanca	Consulate-General		
Morocco	Oujda	Consulate		
Mozambique	Maputo	Embassy	Countries: Eswatini; Malawi	
Namibia	Windhoek	Embassy		
Niger	Niamey	Embassy		
Niger	Agadez	Consulate		
Nigeria	Abuja	Embassy	Countries: Togo	
Rwanda	Kigali	Embassy		
Senegal	Dakar	Embassy	Countries: Cape Verde; Gambia; Guinea-Bissau	
Sierra Leone	Freetown	Embassy		
Somalia	Mogadishu	Embassy		
South Africa	Pretoria	Embassy		
Sudan	Khartoum	Embassy		
Tanzania	Dar es Salaam	Embassy		
Tunisia	Tunis	Embassy		
Tunisia	El Kef	Consulate		
Tunisia	Gafsa	Consulate		
Uganda	Kampala	Embassy		
Zambia	Lusaka	Embassy		
Zimbabwe	Harare	Embassy		

=== Americas ===
Host country	Host city	Mission	Concurrent accreditation	Ref.
Argentina	Buenos Aires	Embassy	Countries: Paraguay; Uruguay	
Brazil	Brasília	Embassy	Countries: Bolivia	
Canada	Ottawa	Embassy		
Canada	Montreal	Consulate-General		
Chile	Santiago	Embassy		
Colombia	Bogotá	Embassy		
Cuba	Havana	Embassy		
Ecuador	Quito	Embassy		
Jamaica	Kingston	Embassy		
Mexico	Mexico City	Embassy	Countries: Belize; Costa Rica; El Salvador; Guatemala; Panama	
Nicaragua	Managua	Embassy		
Peru	Lima	Embassy		
United States	Washington, D.C.	Embassy	Multilateral Organizations: Organization of American States (Note: Accredited as an observer mission.)	
United States	New York City	Consulate-General	Multilateral Organizations: Organization of American States	
United States	San Francisco	Consulate-General	Multilateral Organizations: Organization of American States	
Venezuela	Caracas	Embassy	Countries: Antigua and Barbuda; Barbados; Dominica; Dominican Republic; Guyana; Saint Kitts and Nevis; Saint Vincent and the Grenadines; Suriname; Trinidad and Tobago	

=== Asia ===
Host country	Host city	Mission	Concurrent accreditation	Ref.
Azerbaijan	Baku	Embassy		
Bangladesh	Dhaka	Embassy		
Bahrain	Manama	Embassy		
China	Beijing	Embassy	Countries: Mongolia; North Korea	
India	New Delhi	Embassy	Countries: Maldives; Nepal; Sri Lanka	
Indonesia	Jakarta	Embassy	Countries: Brunei; Singapore; Multilateral Organizations: Association of Southeast Asian Nations	
Iran	Tehran	Embassy		
Iraq	Baghdad	Embassy		
Japan	Tokyo	Embassy		
Jordan	Amman	Embassy		
Kazakhstan	Astana	Embassy		
Kuwait	Kuwait City	Embassy		
Lebanon	Beirut	Embassy	Countries: Cyprus	
Malaysia	Kuala Lumpur	Embassy	Countries: Philippines; Thailand	
Oman	Muscat	Embassy		
Pakistan	Islamabad	Embassy		
Qatar	Doha	Embassy		
Saudi Arabia	Riyadh	Embassy	Multilateral Organizations: Organisation of Islamic Cooperation	
Saudi Arabia	Jeddah	Consulate-General	Multilateral Organizations: Organisation of Islamic Cooperation	
South Korea	Seoul	Embassy		
Syria	Damascus	Embassy		
Turkey	Ankara	Embassy	Countries: Georgia; Turkmenistan	
Turkey	Istanbul	Consulate-General	Countries: Georgia; Turkmenistan	
Uzbekistan	Tashkent	Embassy	Countries: Kyrgyzstan; Tajikistan	
Vietnam	Hanoi	Embassy	Countries: Cambodia; Laos; Myanmar	

=== Europe ===
Host country	Host city	Mission	Concurrent accreditation	Ref.
Austria	Vienna	Embassy	Multilateral Organizations: United Nations	
Albania	Tirana	Embassy office (Note: Subordinate to the embassy in Athens, Greece.)		
Belgium	Brussels	Embassy	Countries: Luxembourg; Multilateral Organizations: European Union; NATO	
Bosnia and Herzegovina	Sarajevo	Embassy		
Bulgaria	Sofia	Embassy		
Croatia	Zagreb	Embassy		
Czech Republic	Prague	Embassy		
Denmark	Copenhagen	Embassy		
Finland	Helsinki	Embassy		
France	Paris	Embassy	Countries: Andorra; Monaco	
France	Paris	Consulate-General	Countries: Andorra; Monaco	
France	Lille	Consulate-General	Countries: Andorra; Monaco	
France	Lyon	Consulate-General	Countries: Andorra; Monaco	
France	Marseille	Consulate-General	Countries: Andorra; Monaco	
France	Strasbourg	Consulate-General	Countries: Andorra; Monaco	
France	Besançon	Consulate	Countries: Andorra; Monaco	
France	Bobigny	Consulate	Countries: Andorra; Monaco	
France	Bordeaux	Consulate	Countries: Andorra; Monaco	
France	Créteil	Consulate	Countries: Andorra; Monaco	
France	Grenoble	Consulate	Countries: Andorra; Monaco	
France	Metz	Consulate	Countries: Andorra; Monaco	
France	Montpellier	Consulate	Countries: Andorra; Monaco	
France	Nanterre	Consulate	Countries: Andorra; Monaco	
France	Nantes	Consulate	Countries: Andorra; Monaco	
France	Nice	Consulate	Countries: Andorra; Monaco	
France	Pontoise	Consulate	Countries: Andorra; Monaco	
France	Saint-Étienne	Consulate	Countries: Andorra; Monaco	
France	Toulouse	Consulate	Countries: Andorra; Monaco	
Germany	Berlin	Embassy		
Germany	Frankfurt	Consulate-General		
Greece	Athens	Embassy	Countries: Albania	
Hungary	Budapest	Embassy		
Ireland	Dublin	Embassy		
Italy	Rome	Embassy	Countries: Malta; San Marino	
Italy	Milan	Consulate-General	Countries: Malta; San Marino	
Italy	Naples	Consulate-General	Countries: Malta; San Marino	
Netherlands	The Hague	Embassy		
Norway	Oslo	Embassy		
Poland	Warsaw	Embassy	Countries: Estonia; Latvia; Lithuania	
Portugal	Lisbon	Embassy		
Romania	Bucharest	Embassy	Countries: North Macedonia	
Russia	Moscow	Embassy	Countries: Armenia; Belarus	
Serbia	Belgrade	Embassy	Countries: Montenegro	
Slovakia	Bratislava	Embassy		
Slovenia	Ljubljana	Embassy		
Spain	Madrid	Embassy		
Spain	Barcelona	Consulate-General		
Spain	Alicante	Consulate		
Sweden	Stockholm	Embassy	Countries: Iceland	
Switzerland	Bern	Embassy	Countries: Liechtenstein	
Switzerland	Geneva	Consulate-General	Countries: Liechtenstein	
Ukraine	Kiev	Embassy	Countries: Moldova	
United Kingdom	London	Embassy		

=== Oceania ===
Host country	Host city	Mission	Concurrent accreditation	Ref.
Australia	Canberra	Embassy	Countries: Fiji; New Zealand; Timor-Leste; Vanuatu	

=== Multilateral organisations ===
Organization	Host city	Host country	Mission	Concurrent accreditation	Ref.
United Nations	New York City	United States	Permanent Mission		
United Nations	Geneva	Switzerland	Permanent Mission	Countries: Holy See	

== Gallery ==
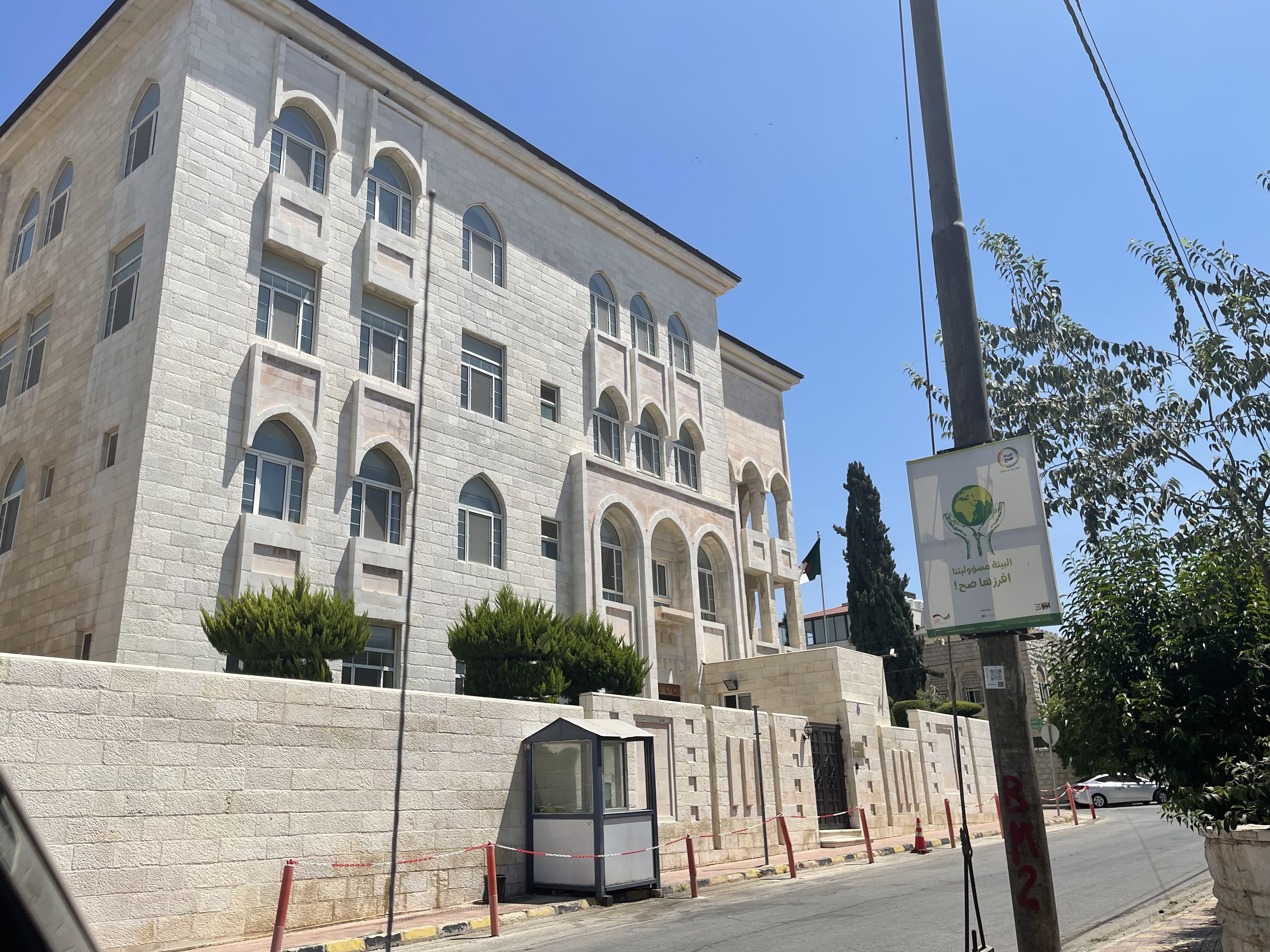
Embassy in Amman

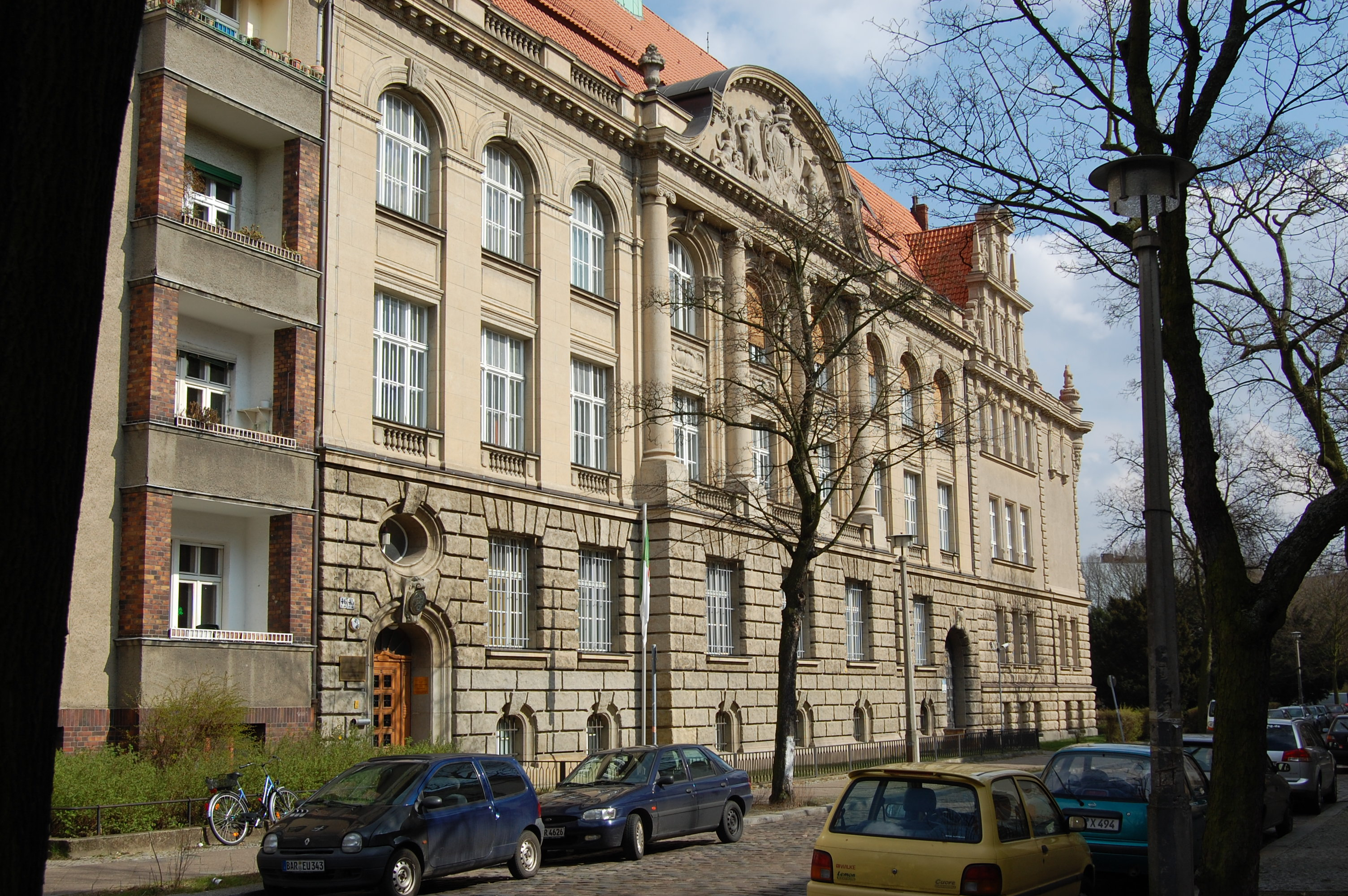
Embassy in Berlin

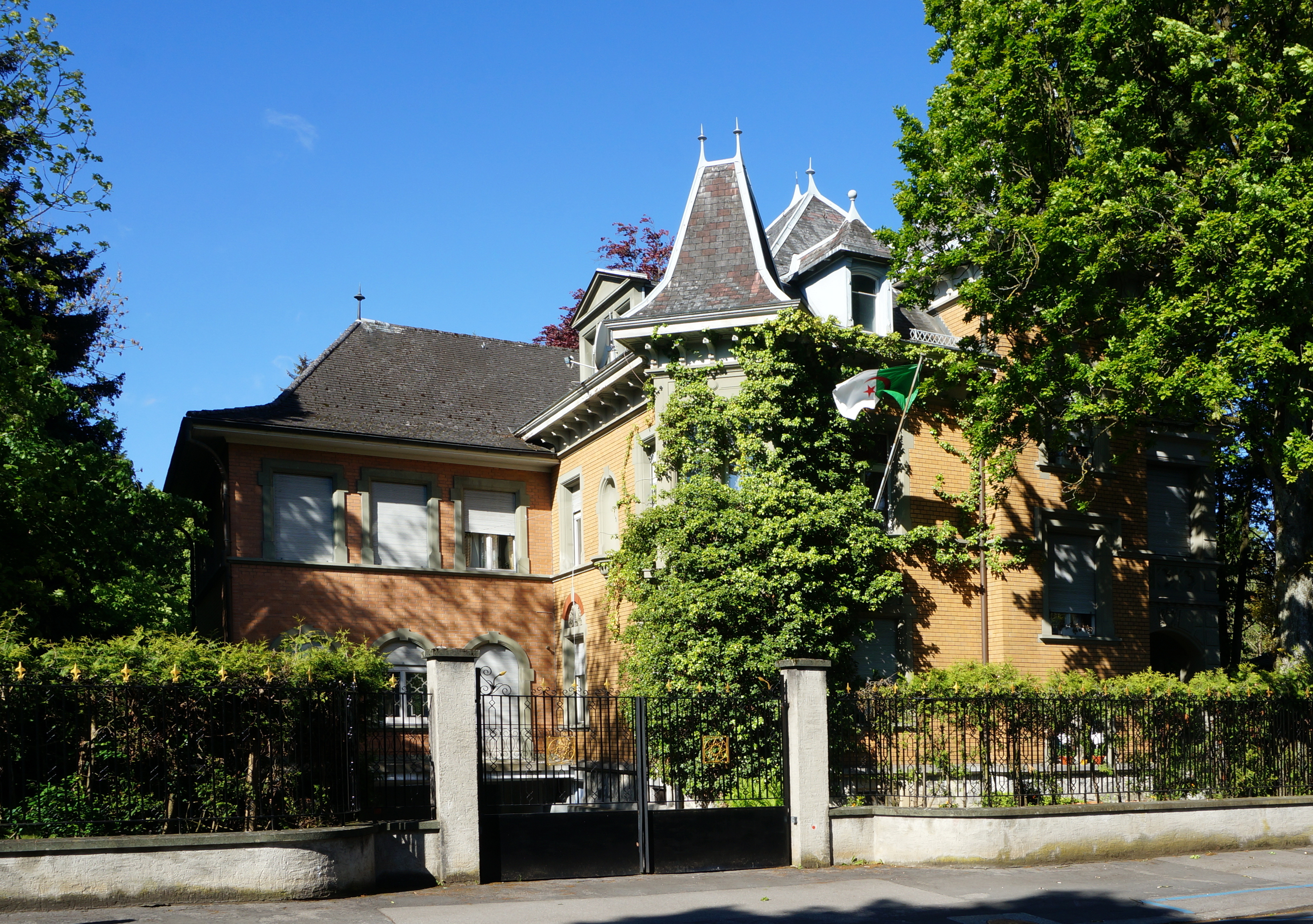
Residence of the Embassy in Bern

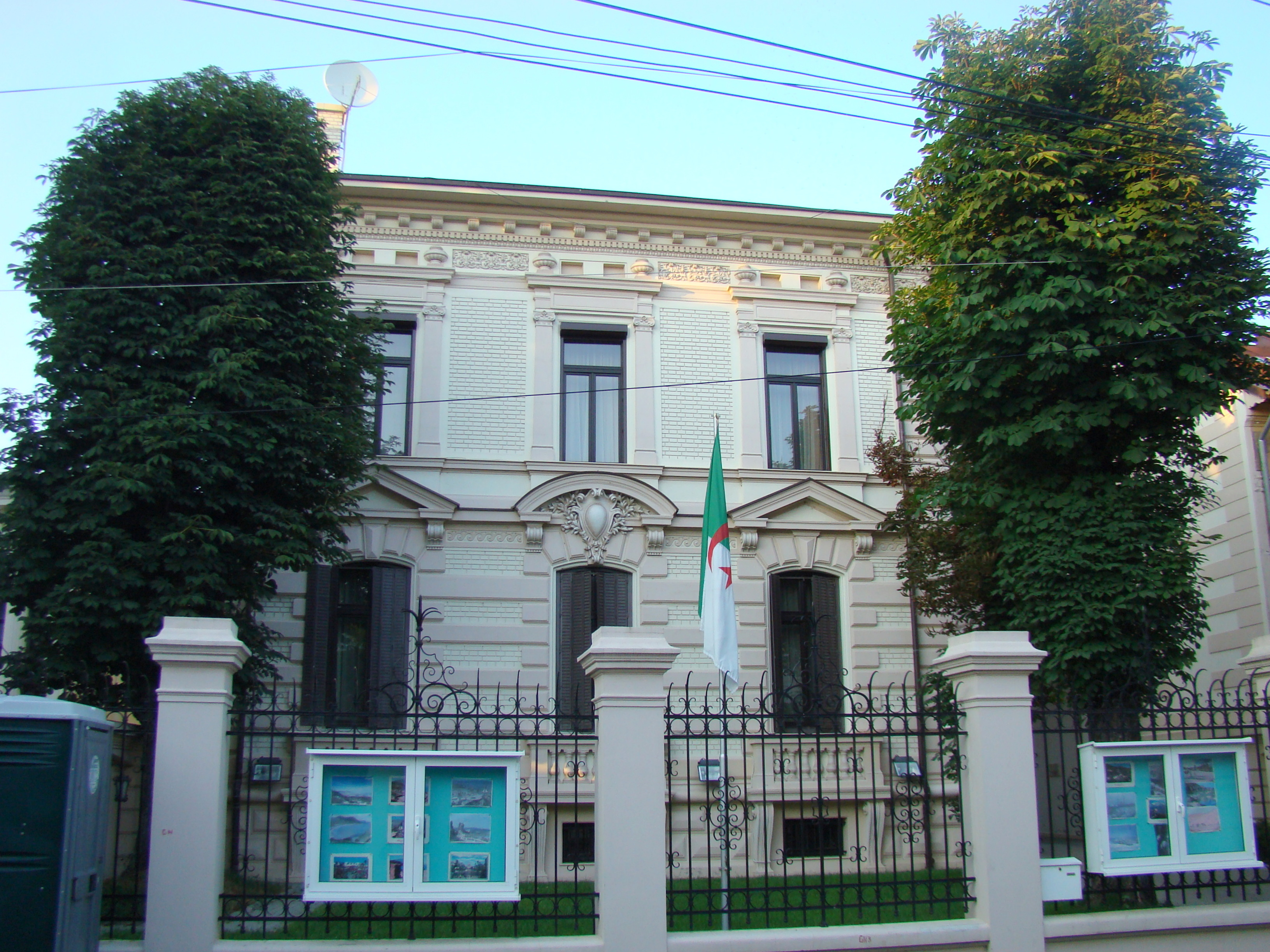
Embassy in Bucharest

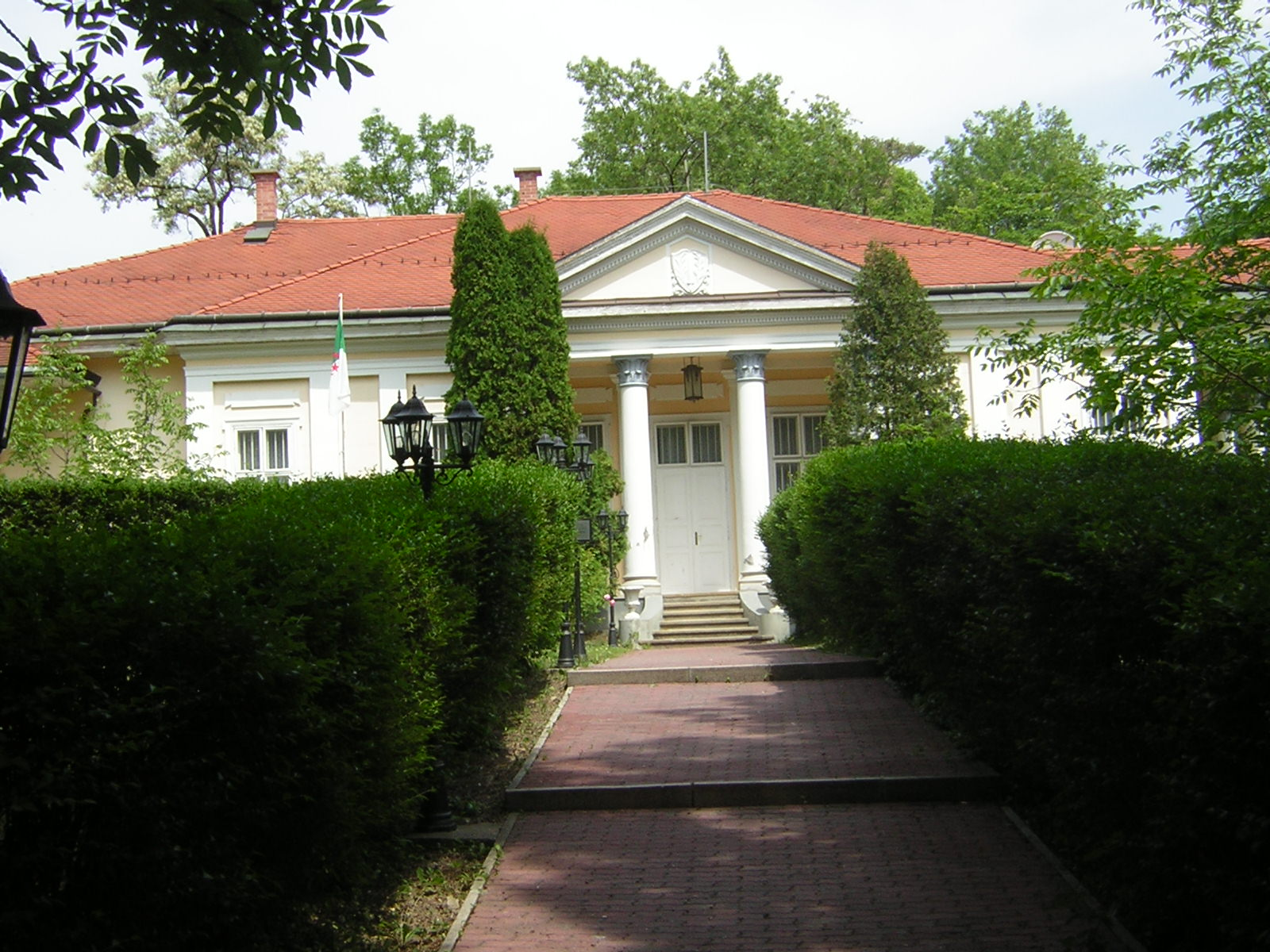
Embassy in Budapest

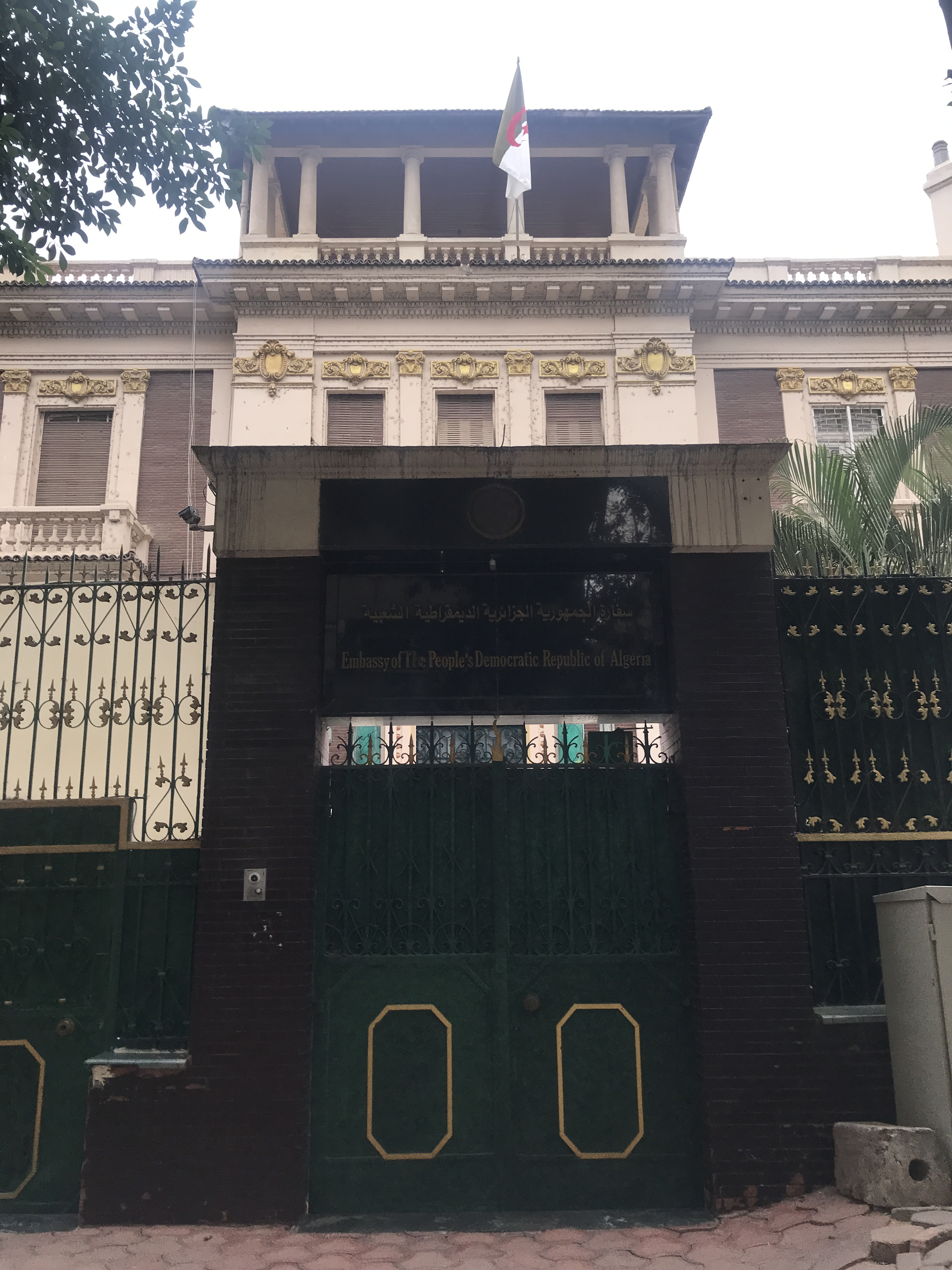
Embassy in Cairo

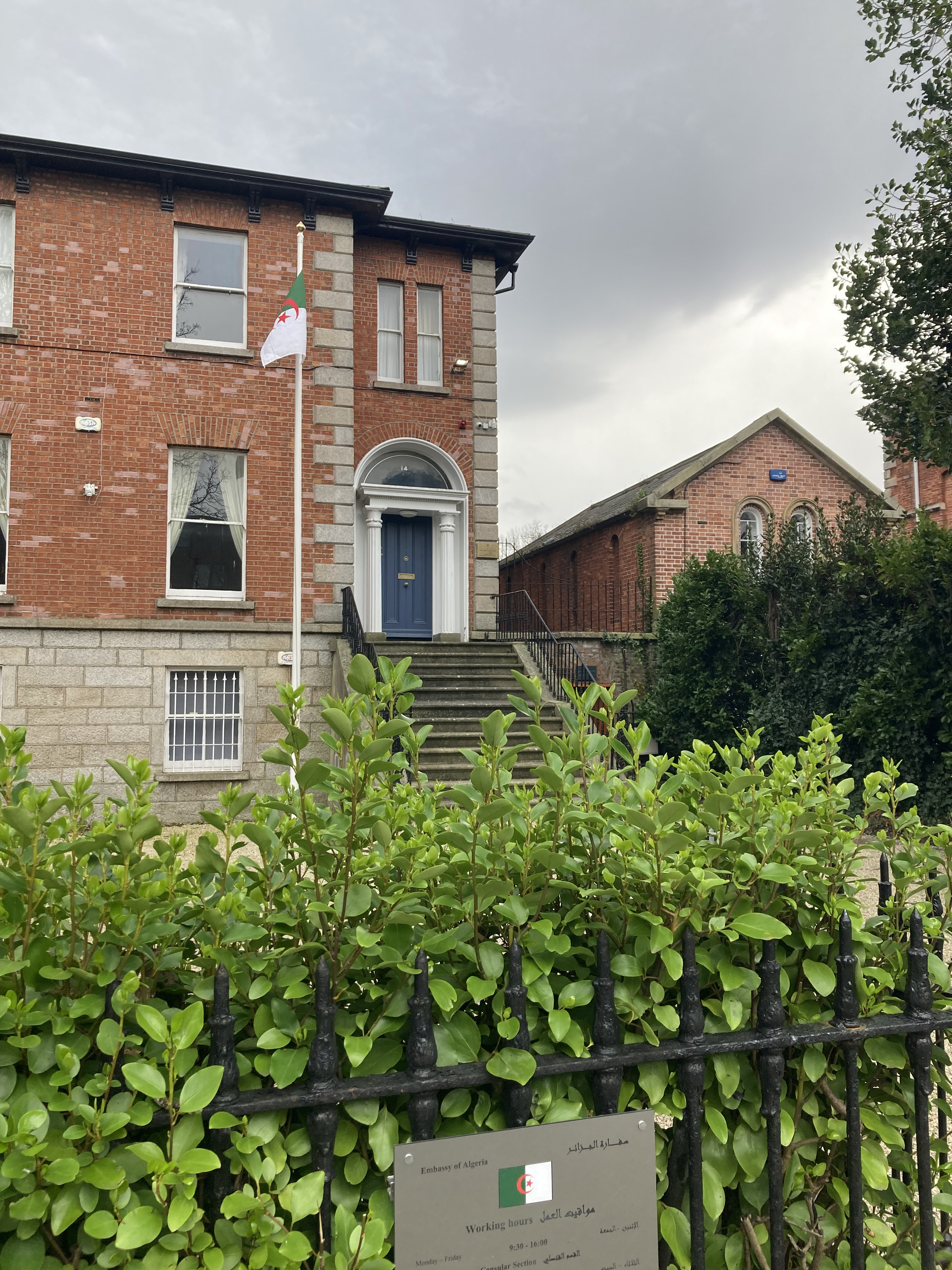
Embassy in Dublin

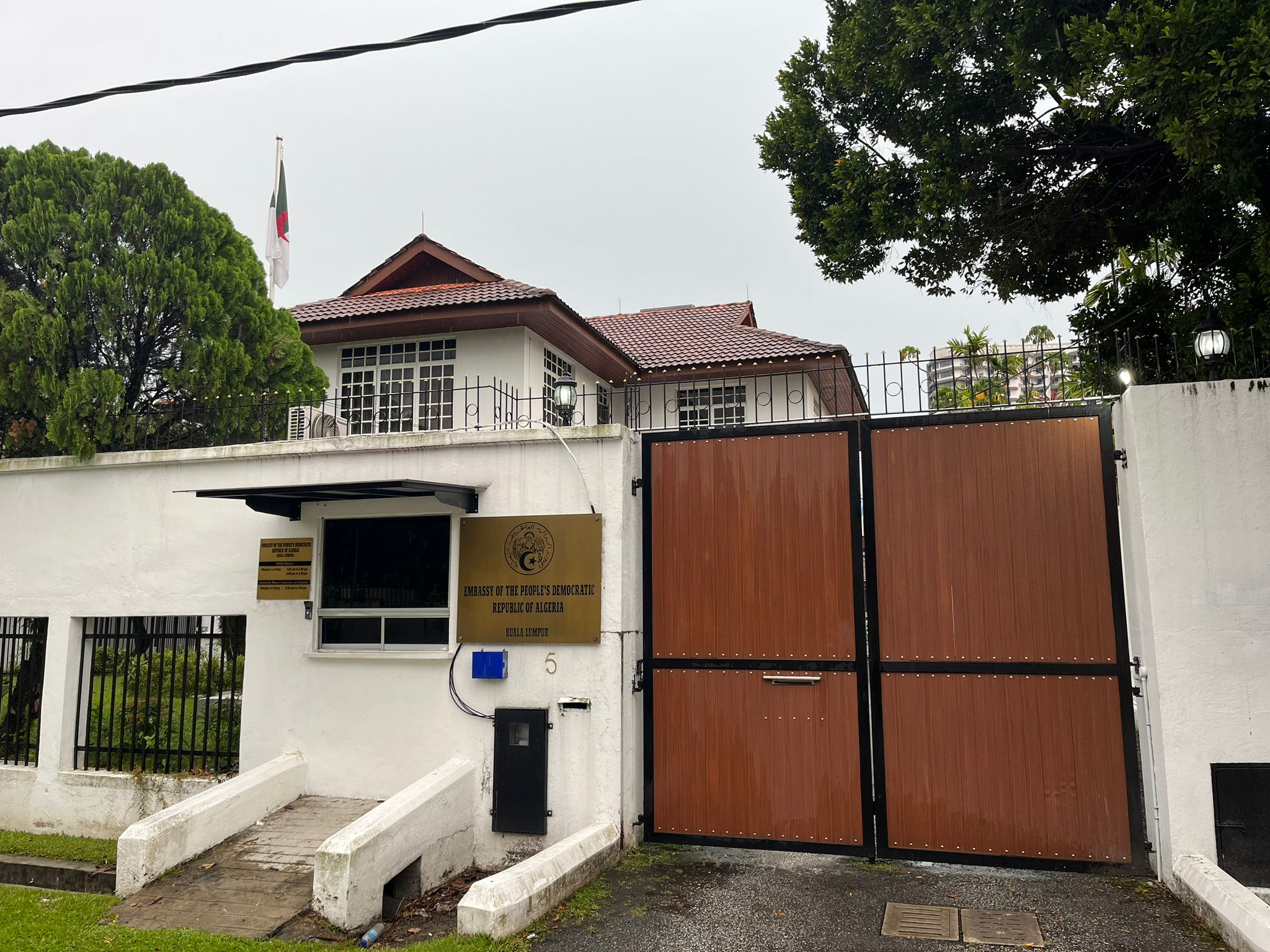
Embassy in Kuala Lumpur

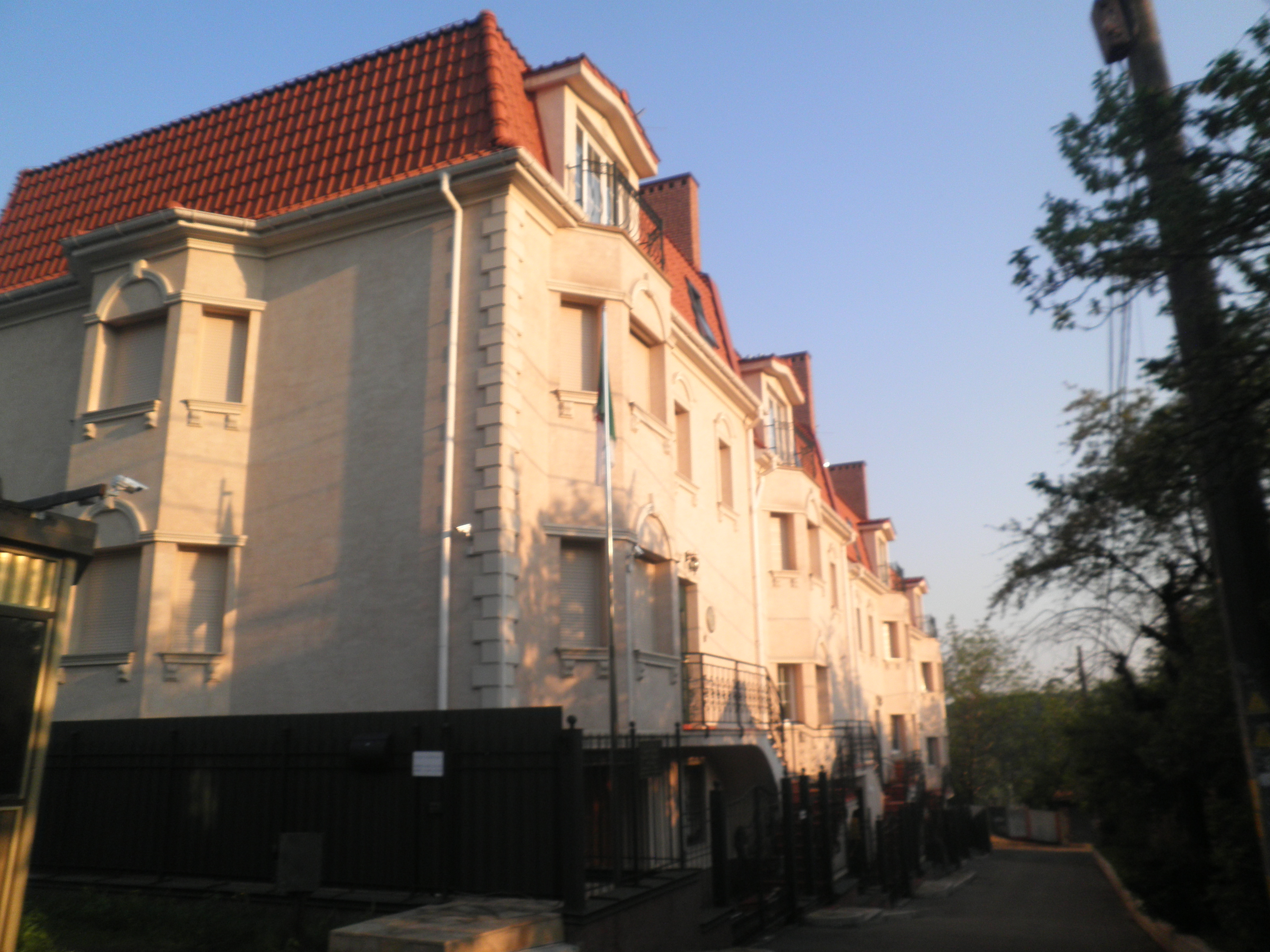
Embassy in Kyiv

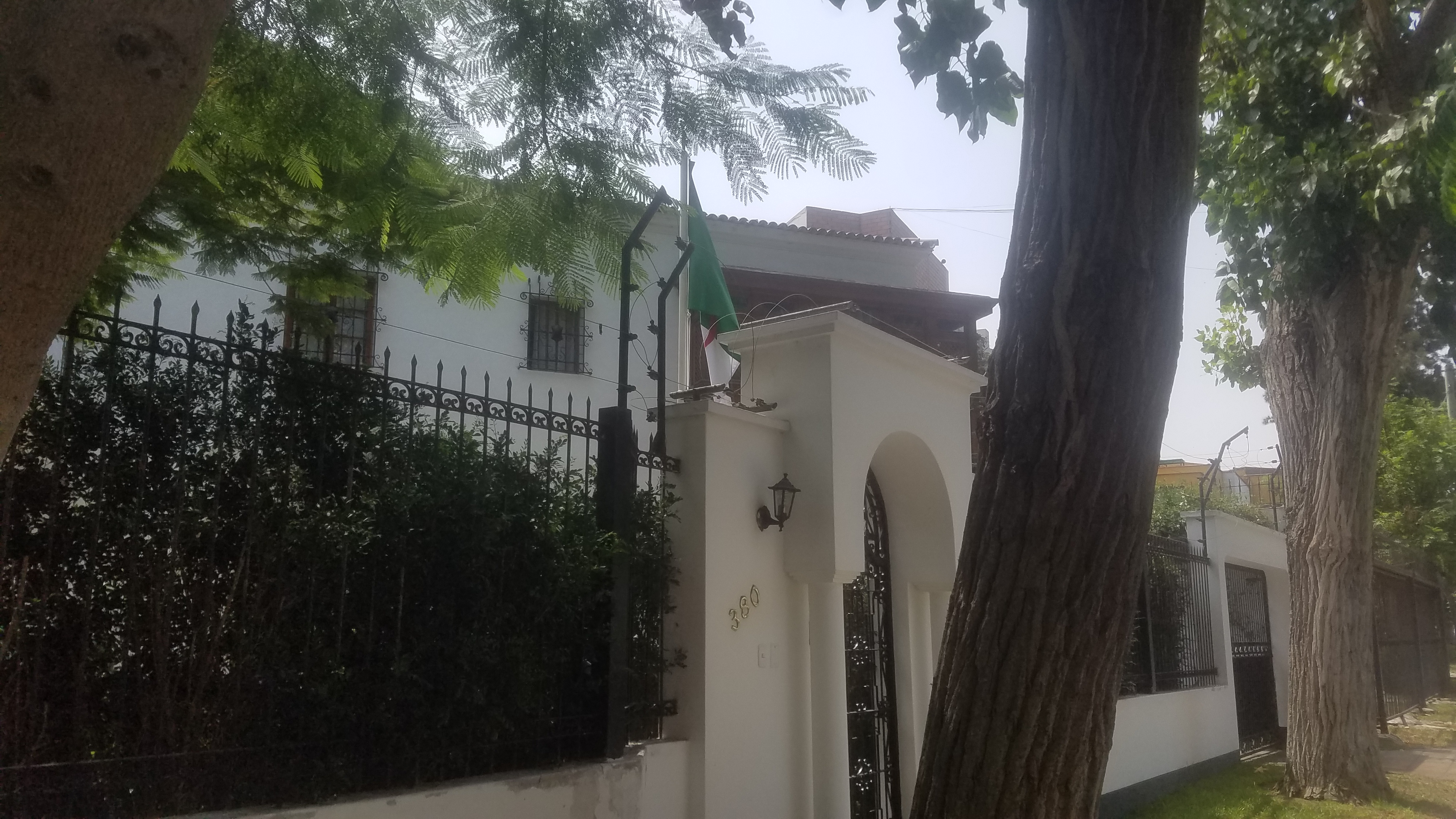
Embassy in Lima

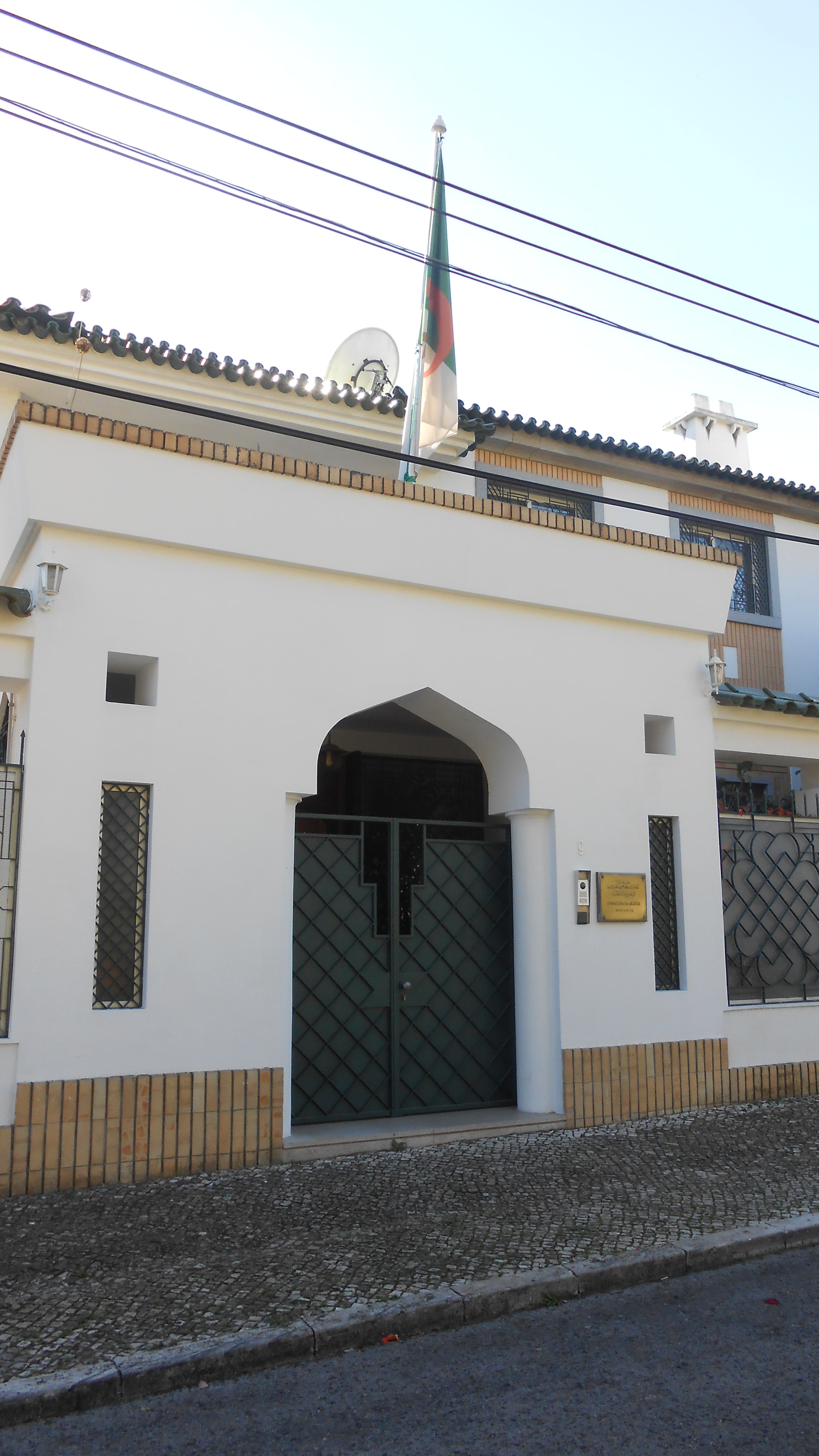
Embassy in Lisbon

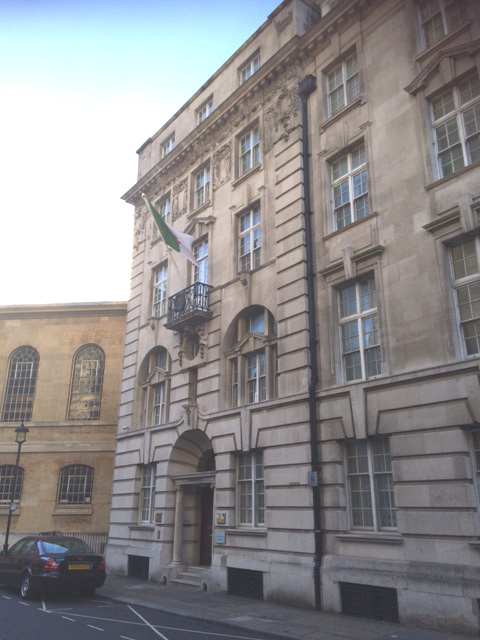
Embassy in London

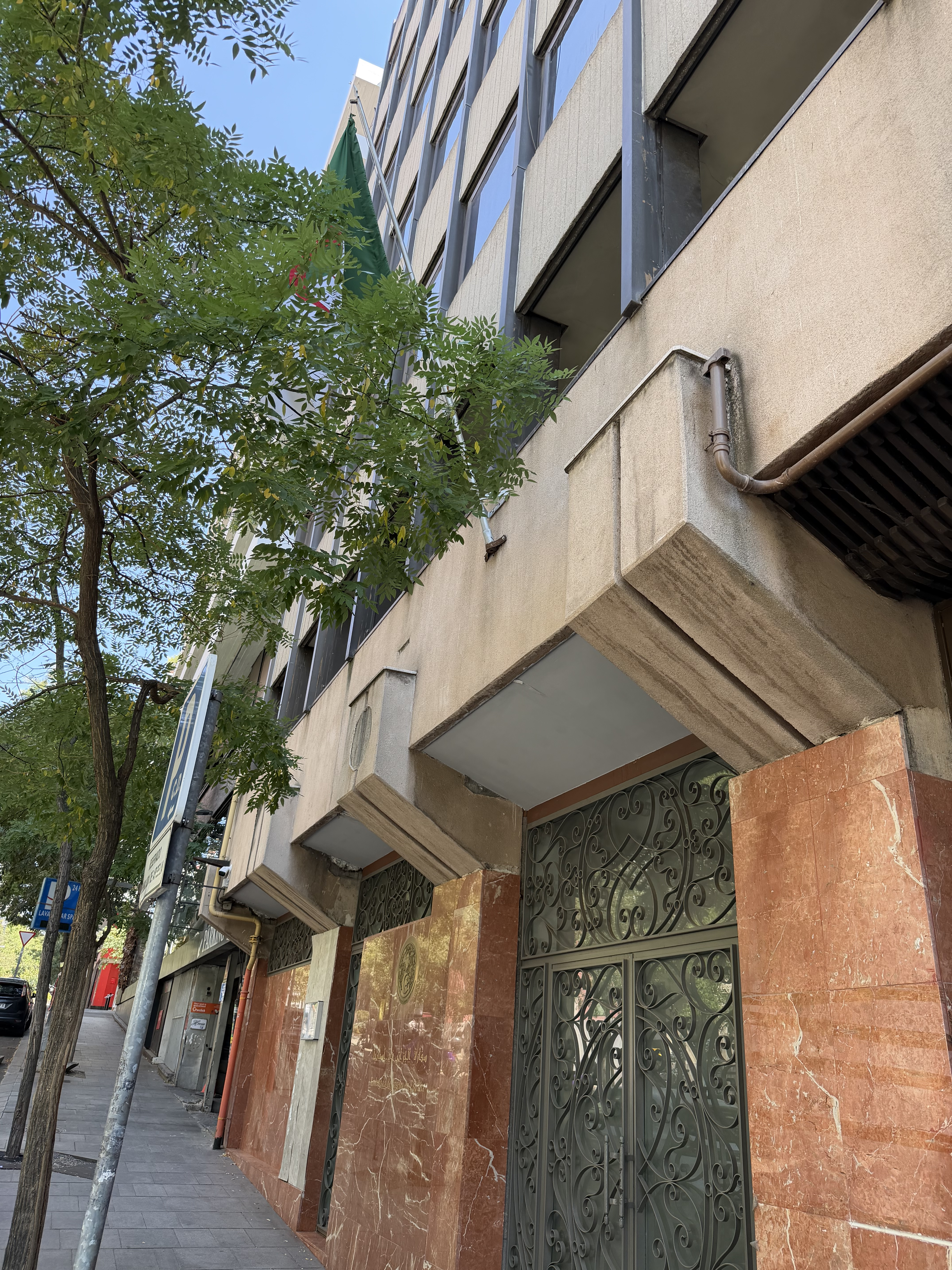
Embassy in Madrid

Consulate-General in Alicante

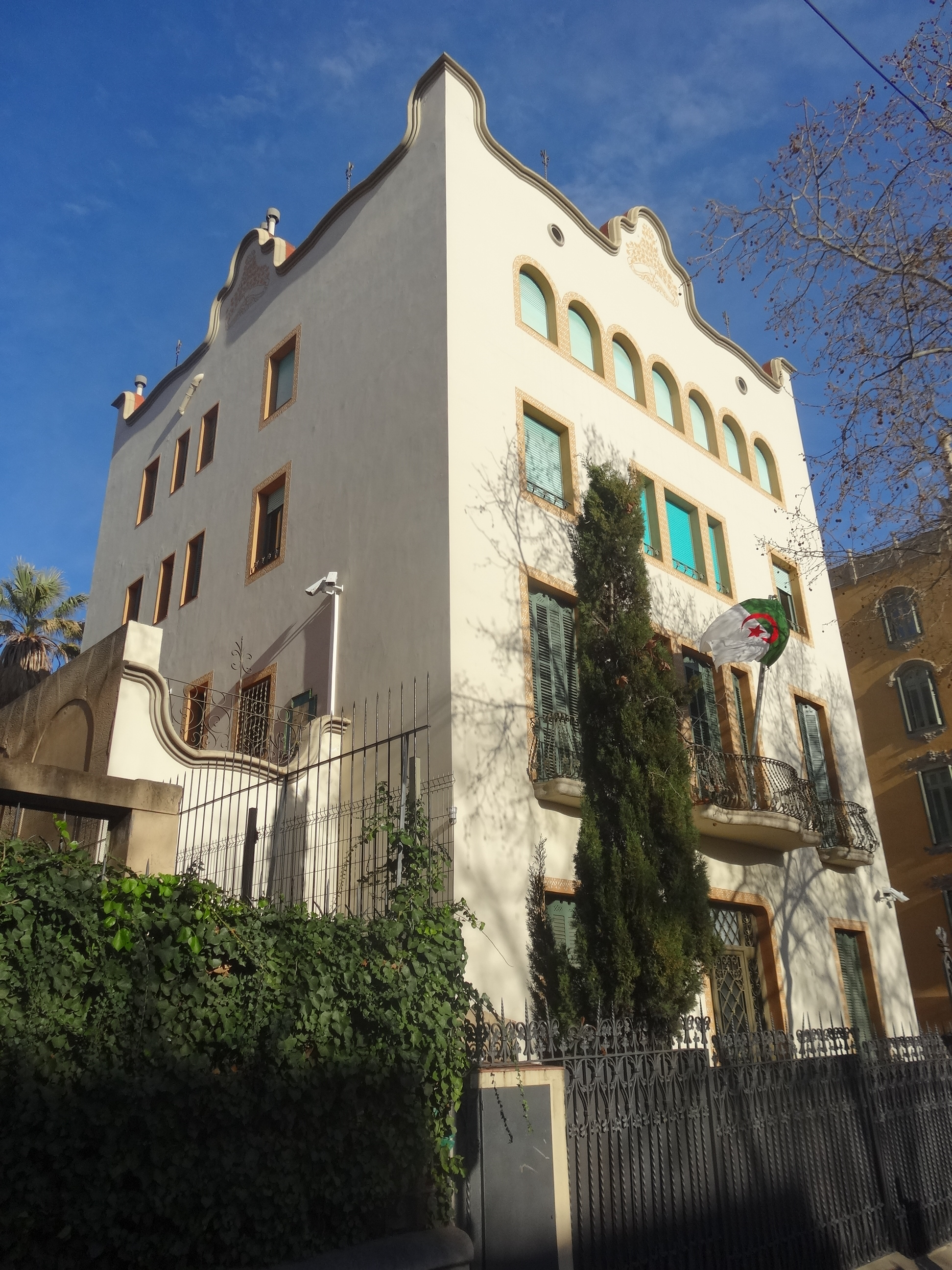
Consulate-General in Barcelona

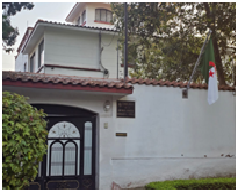
Embassy in Mexico City

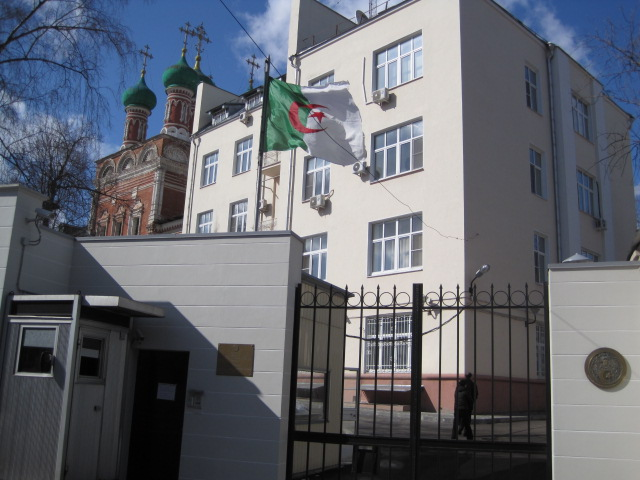
Embassy in Moscow

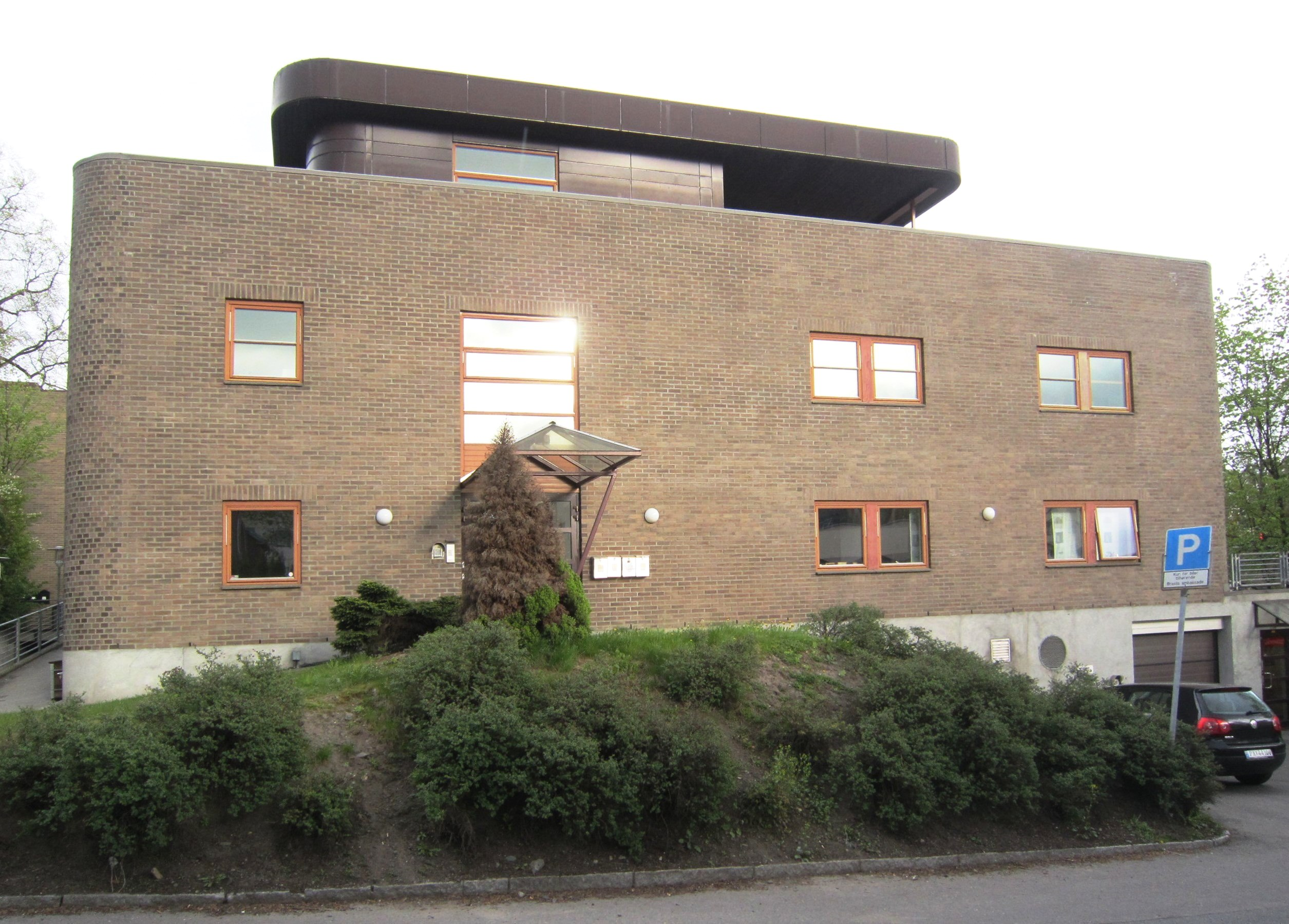
Embassy in Oslo

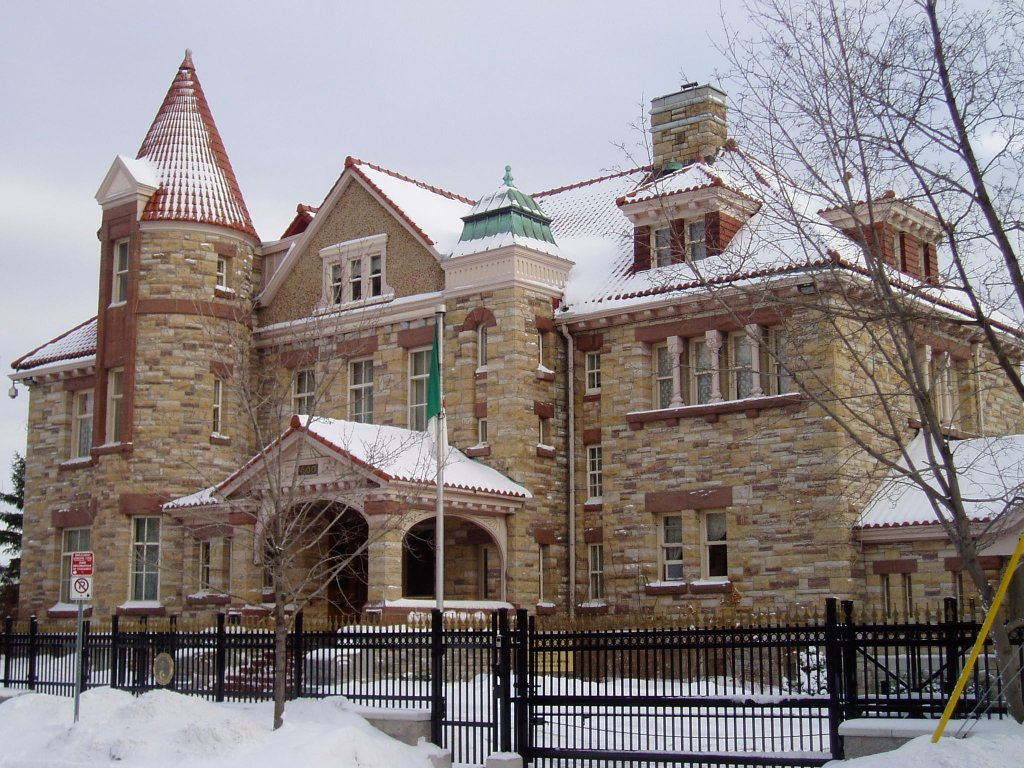
Embassy in Ottawa

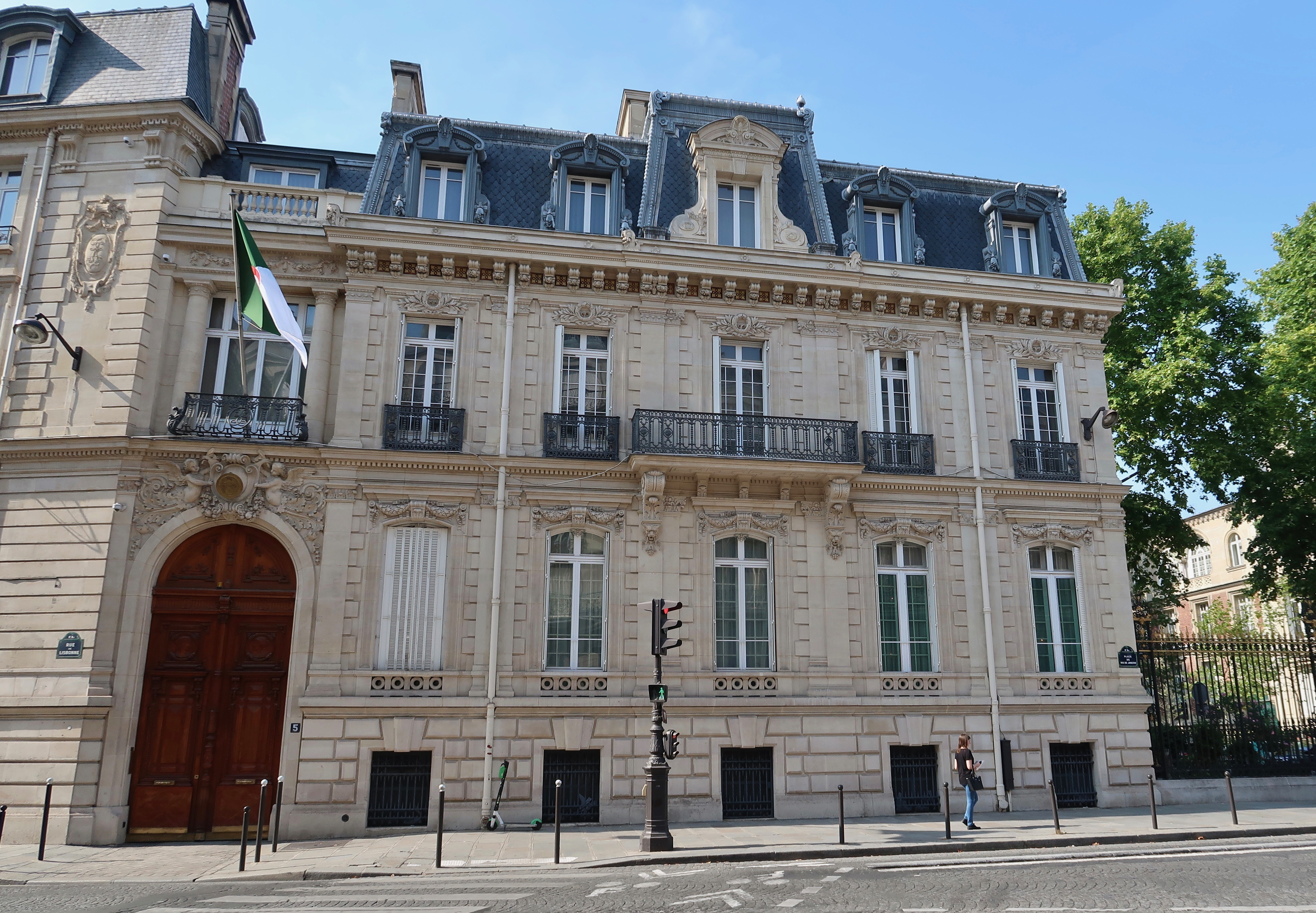
Embassy in Paris

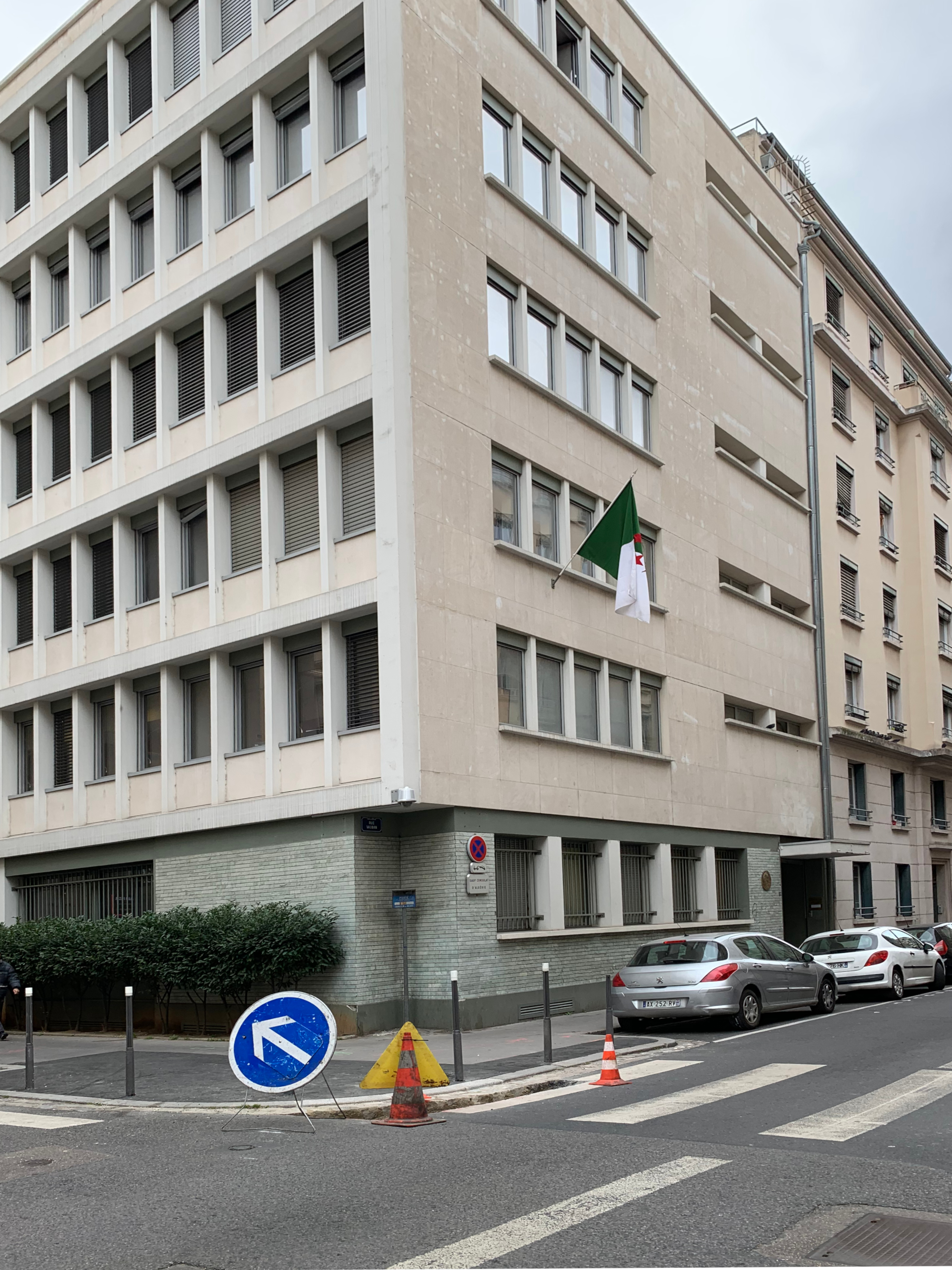
Consulate-General in Lyon

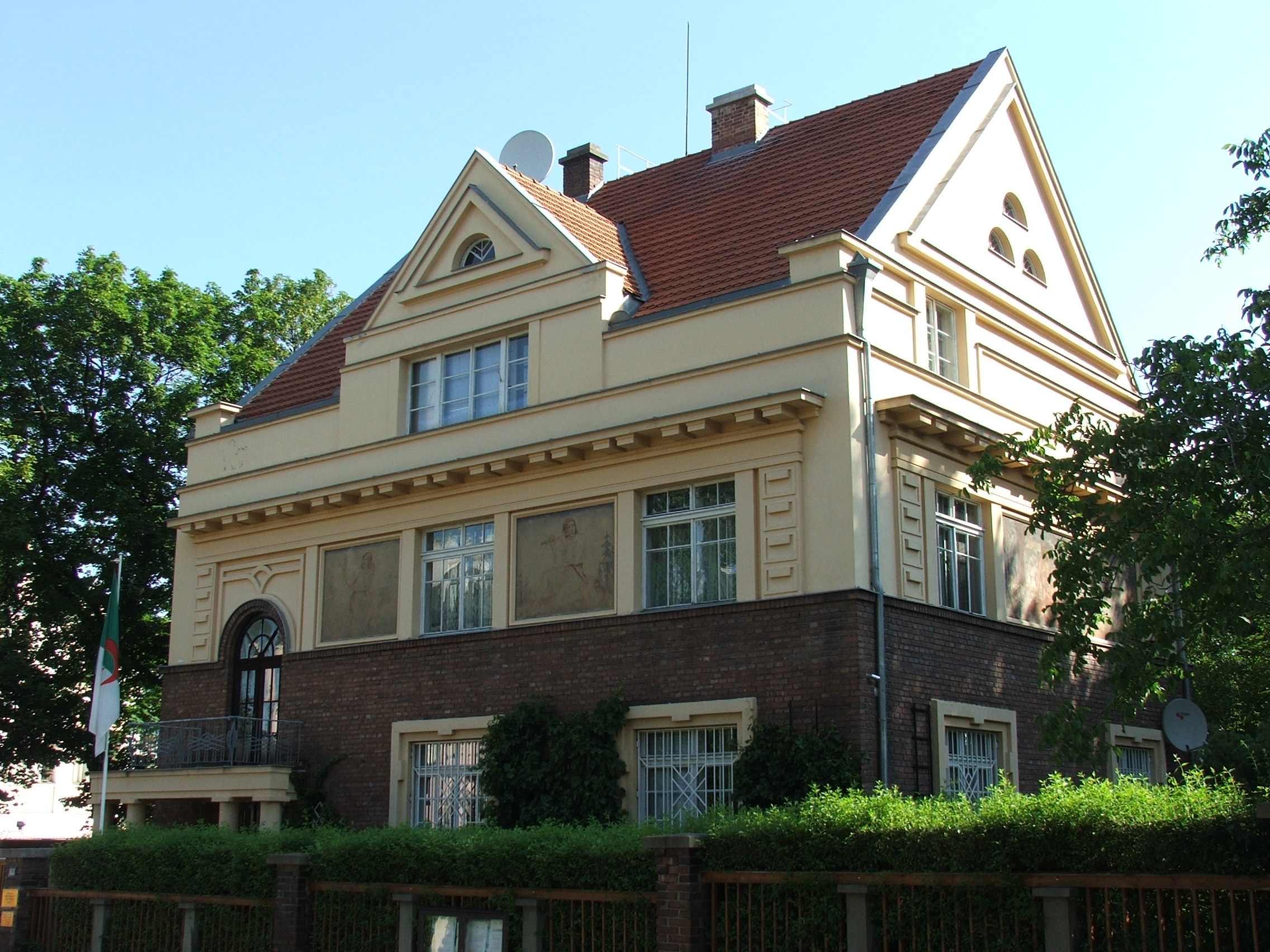
Embassy in Prague

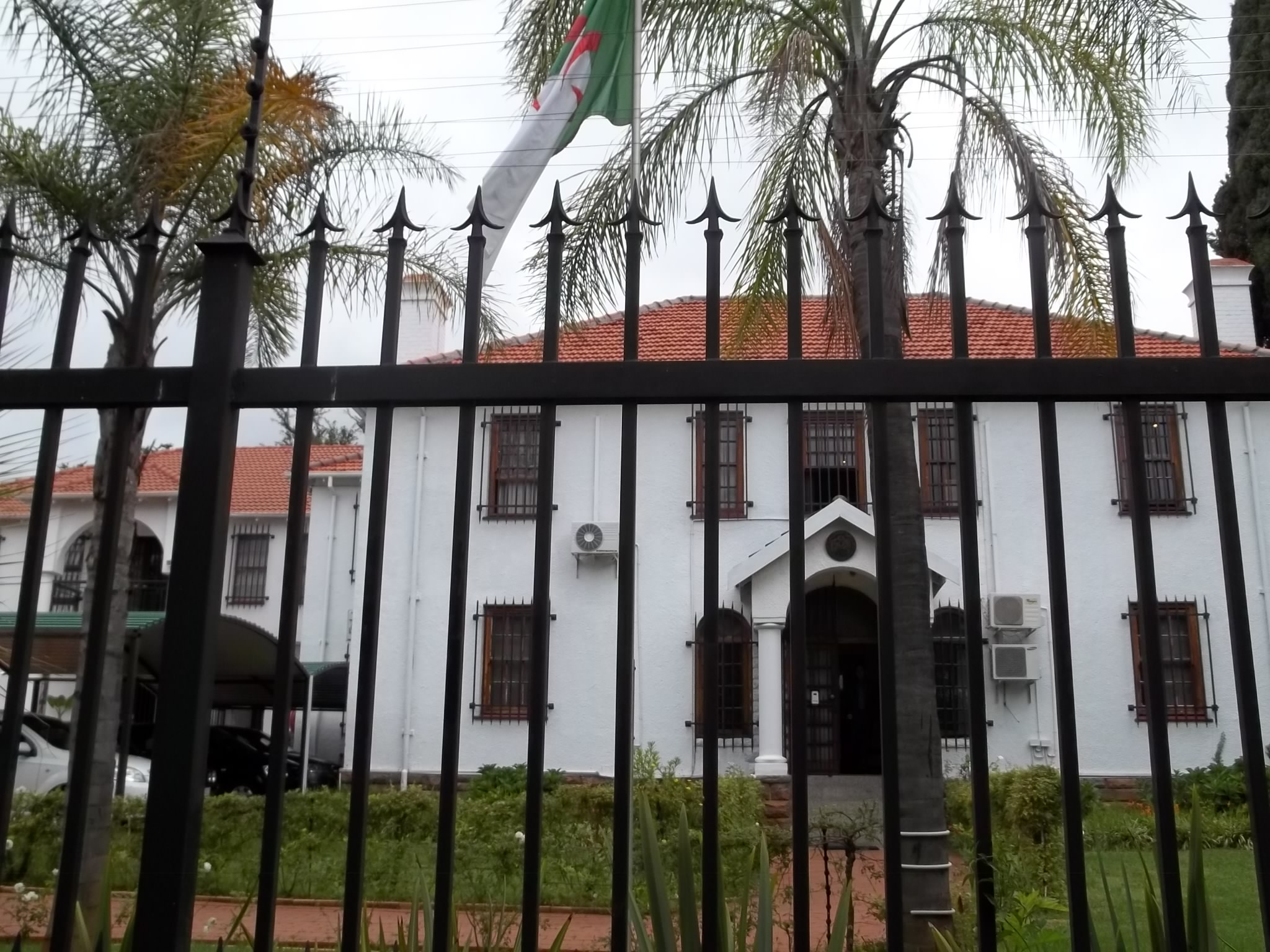
Embassy in Pretoria

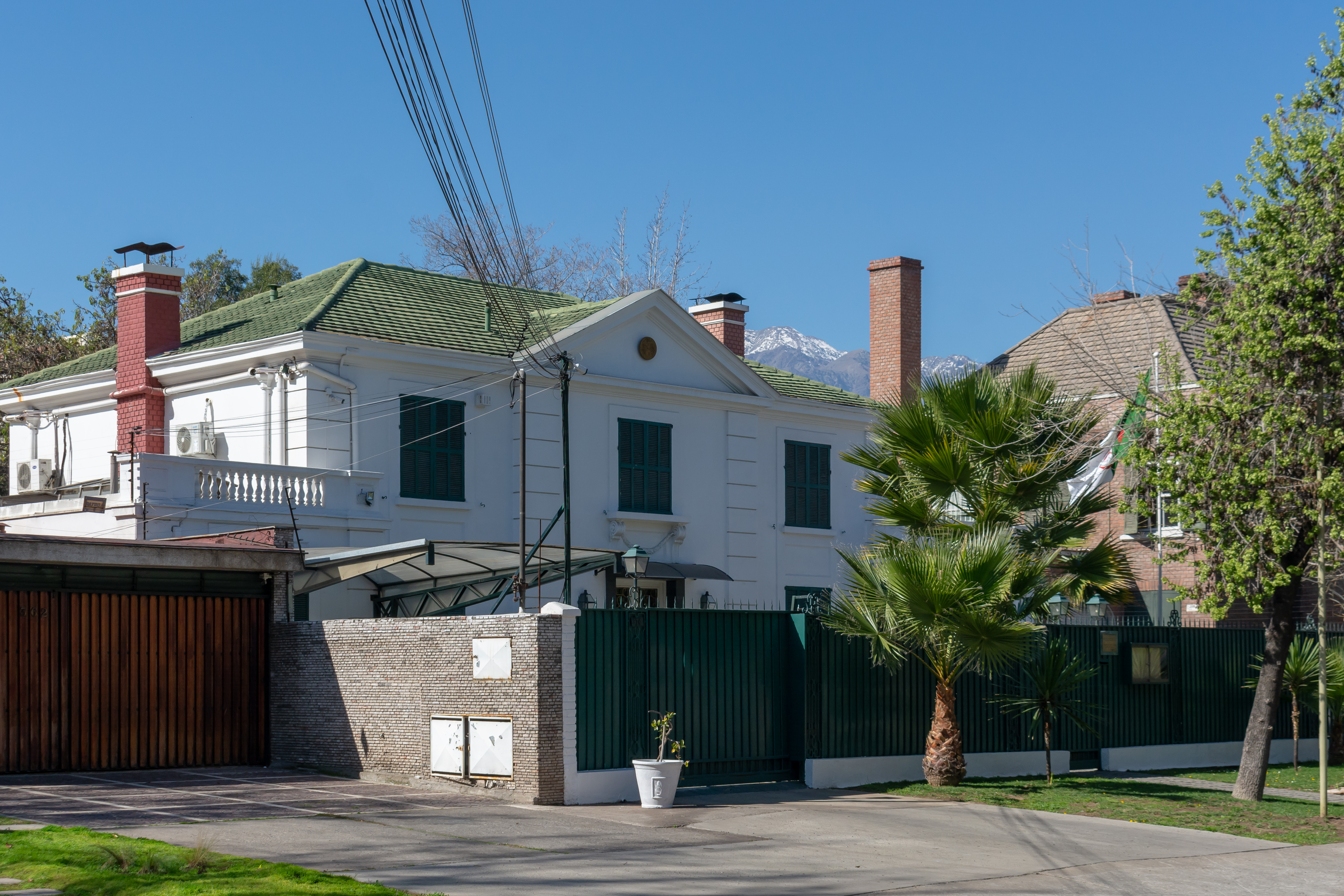
Embassy in Santiago

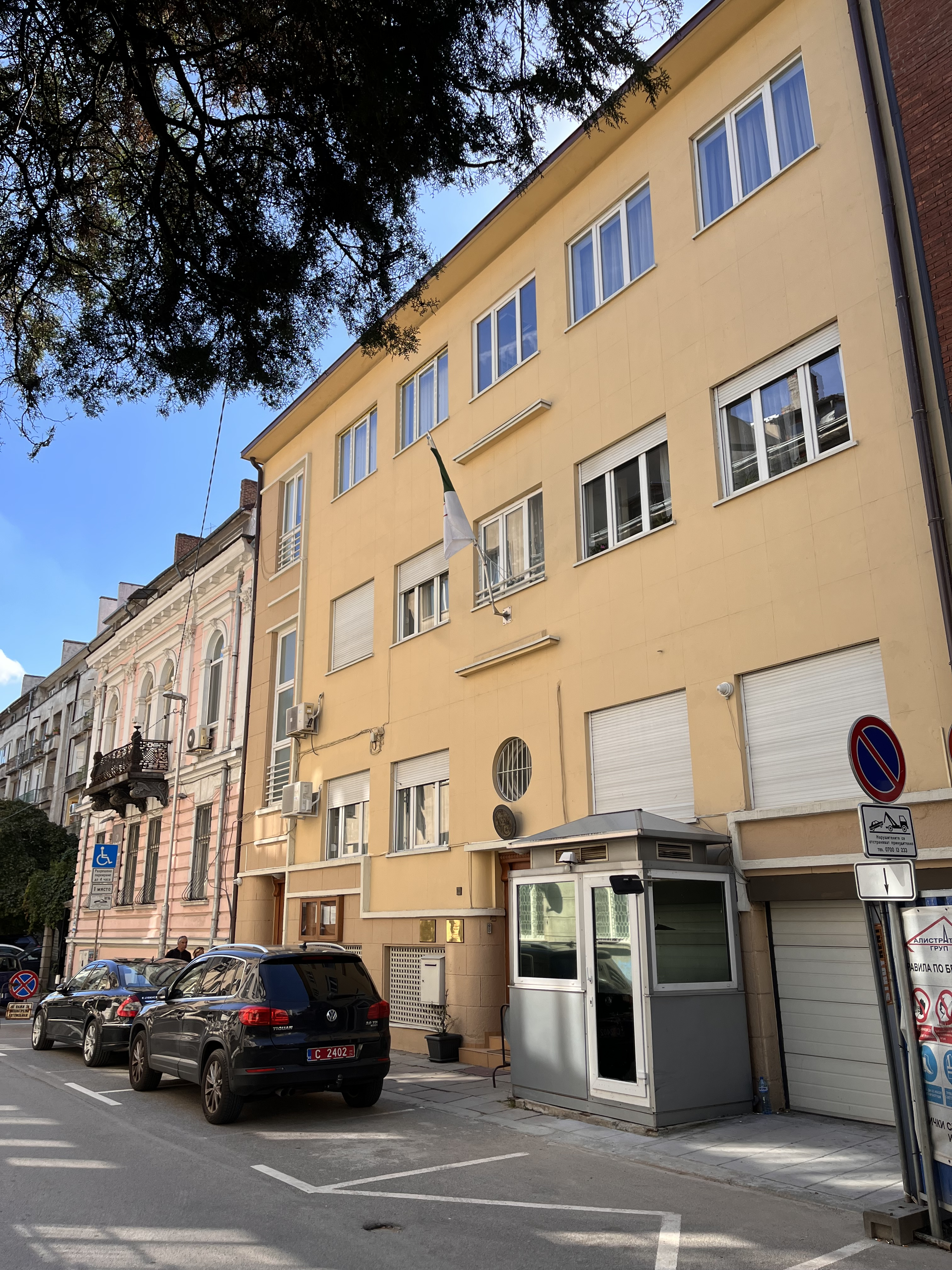
Embassy in Sofia

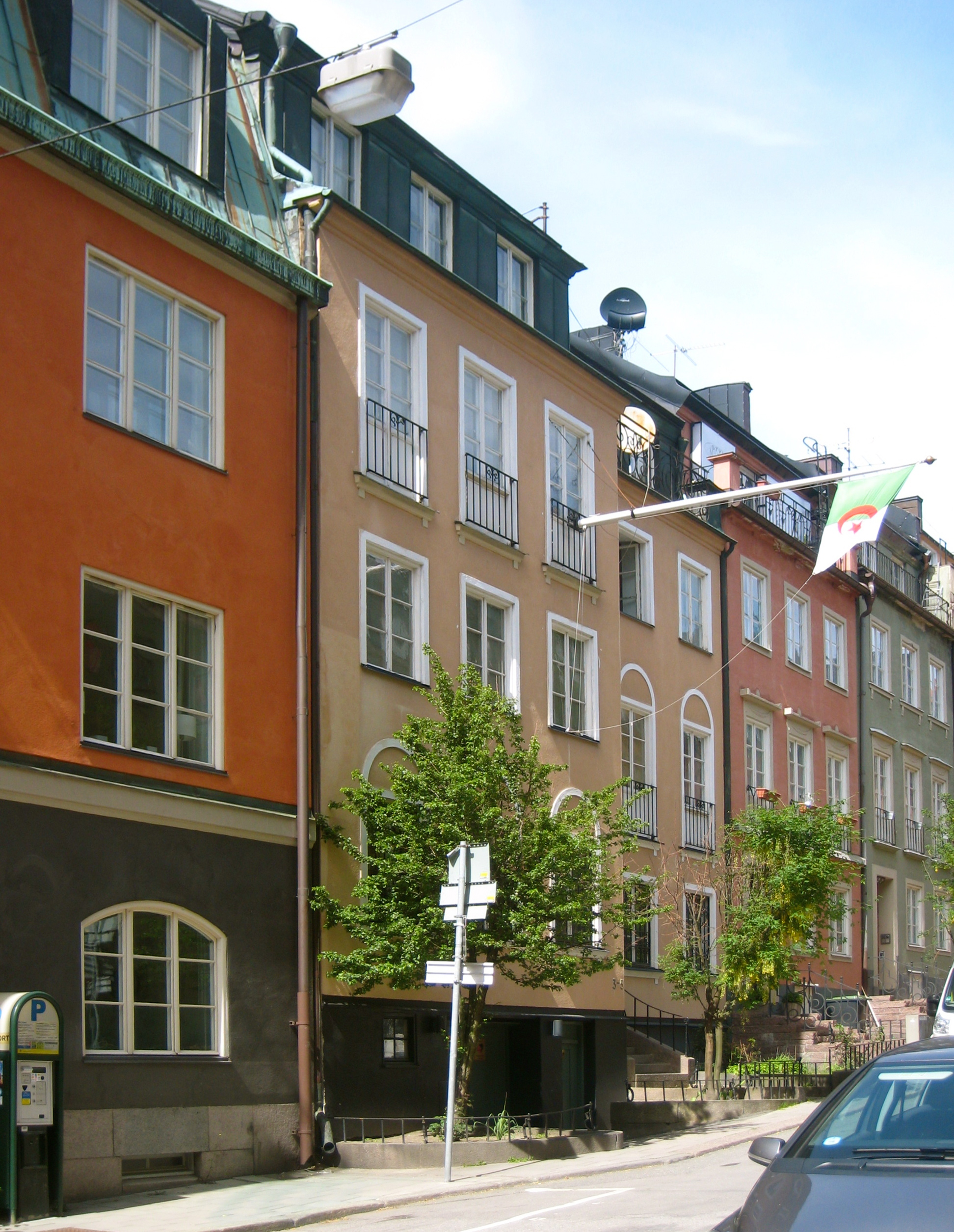
Embassy in Stockholm

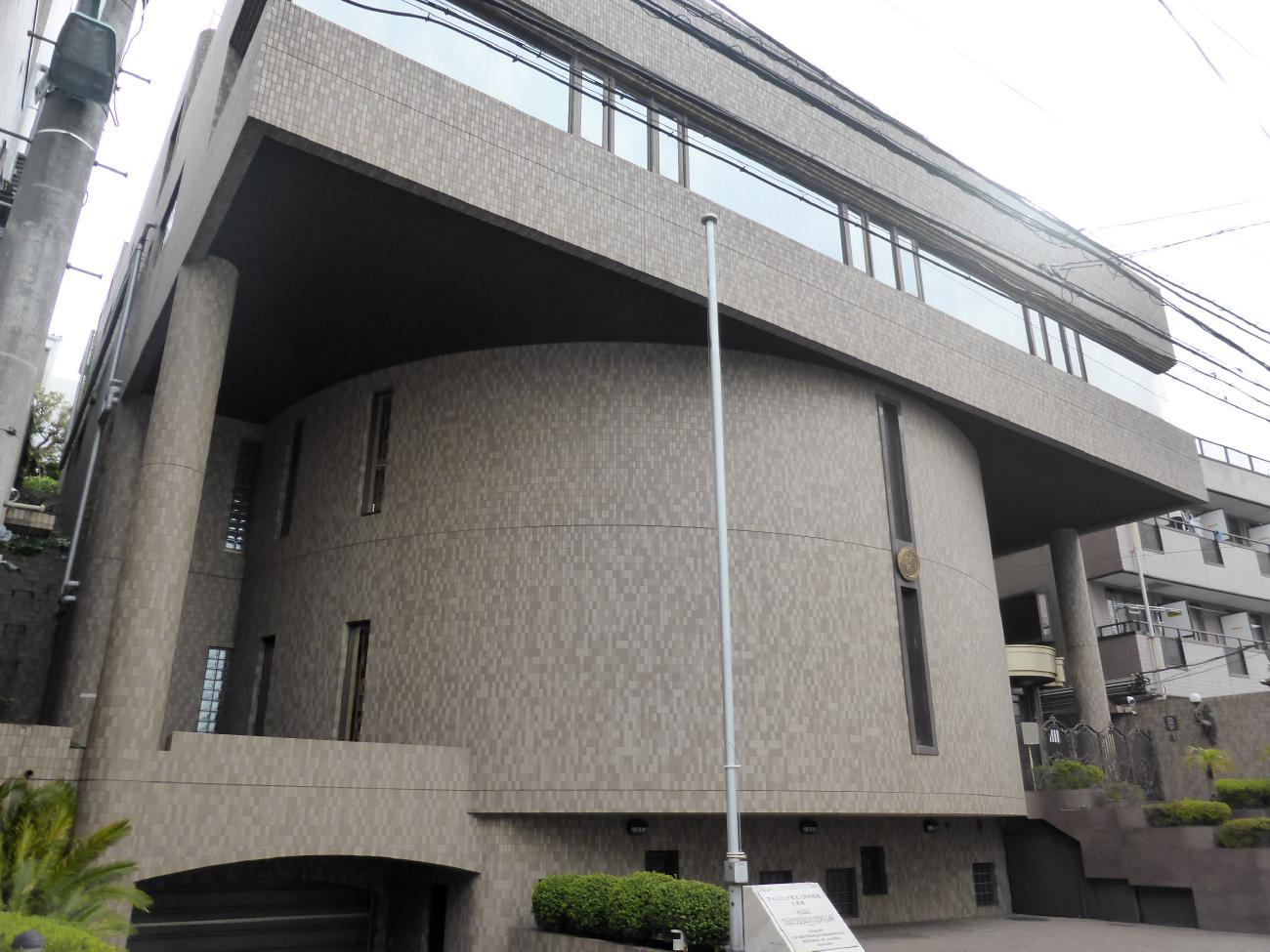
Embassy in Tokyo

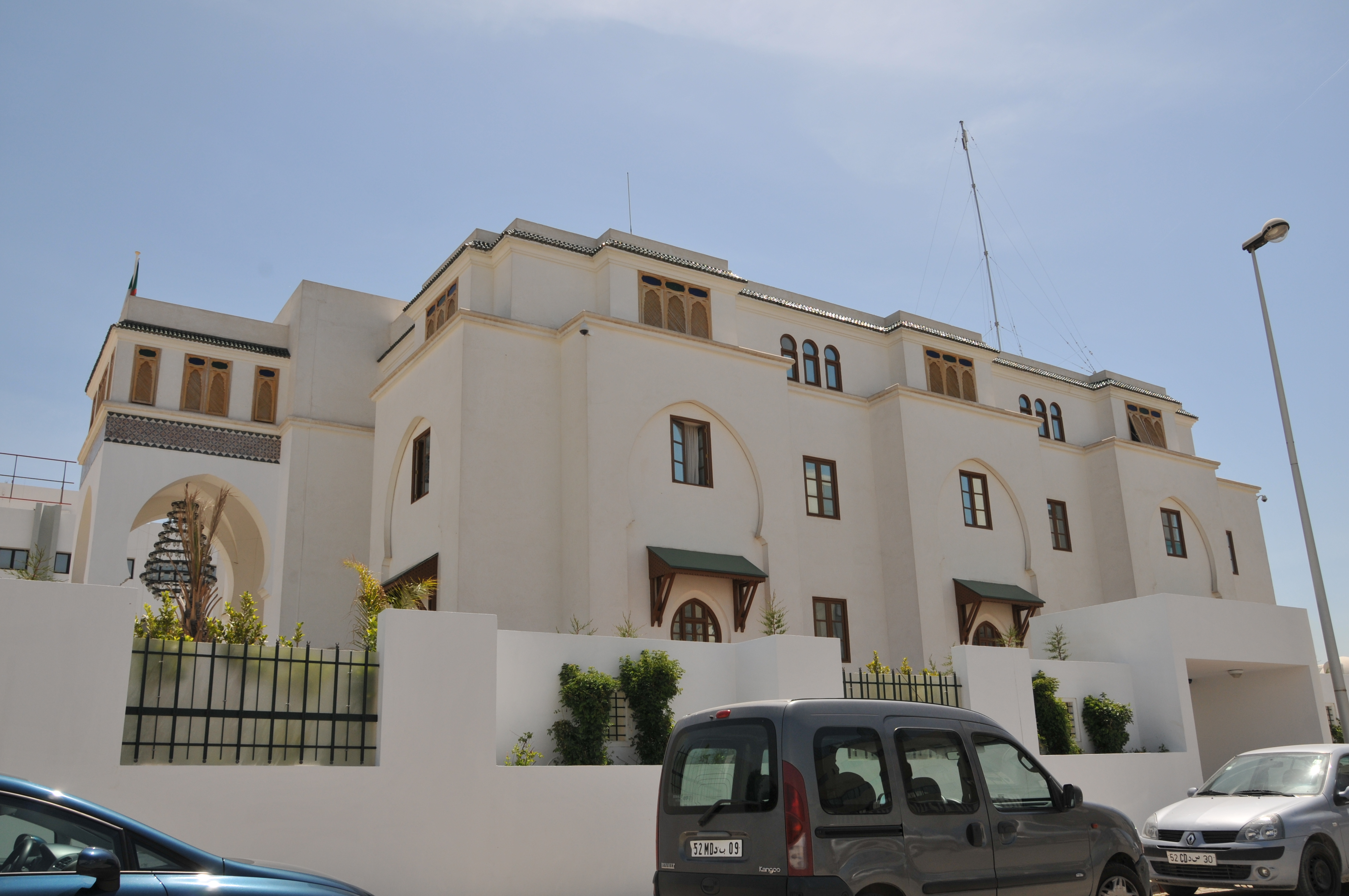
Embassy in Tunis

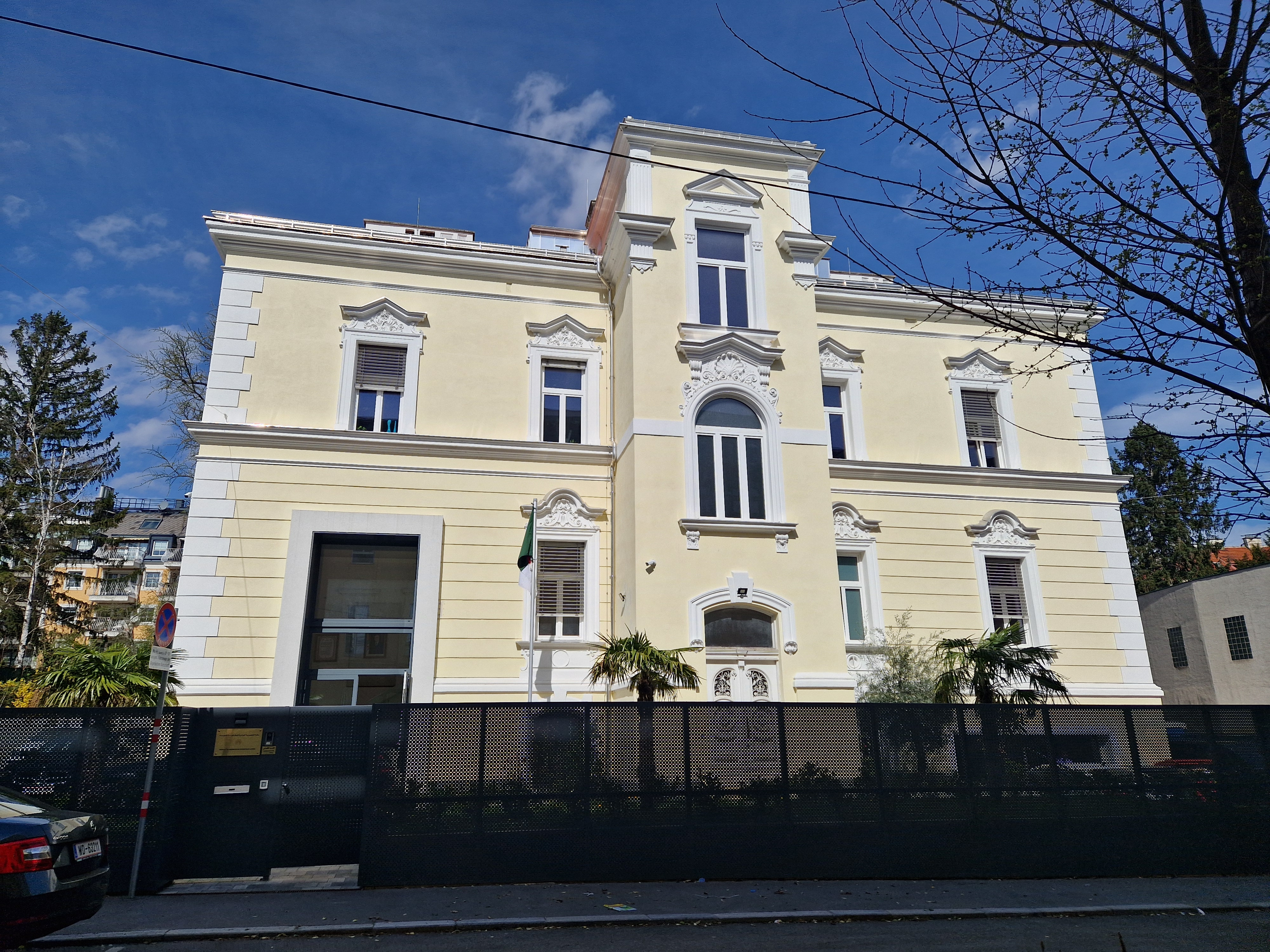
Embassy in Vienna

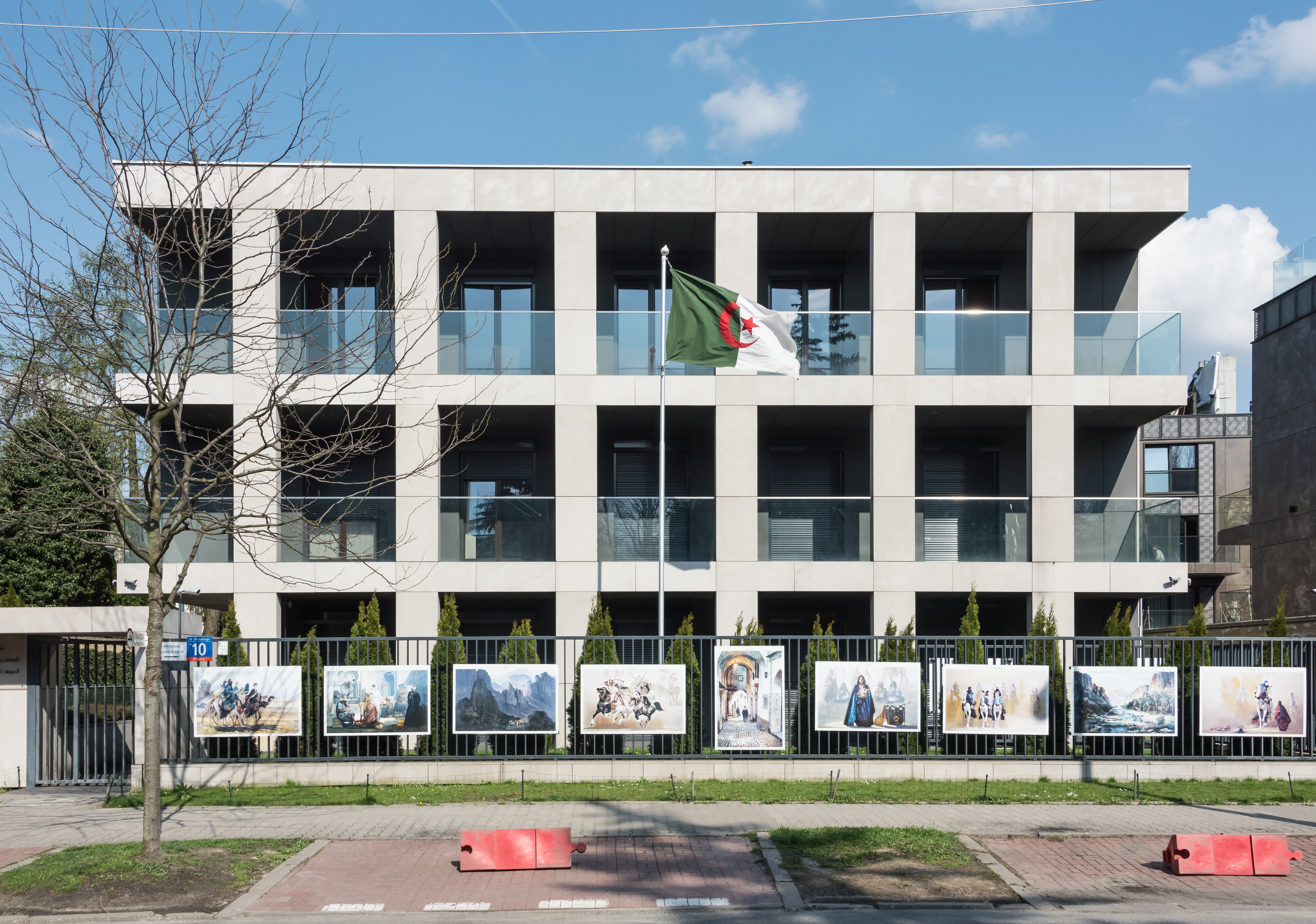
Embassy in Warsaw

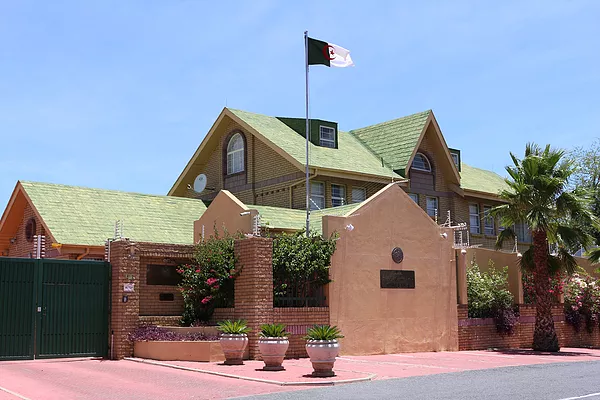
Embassy in Windhoek

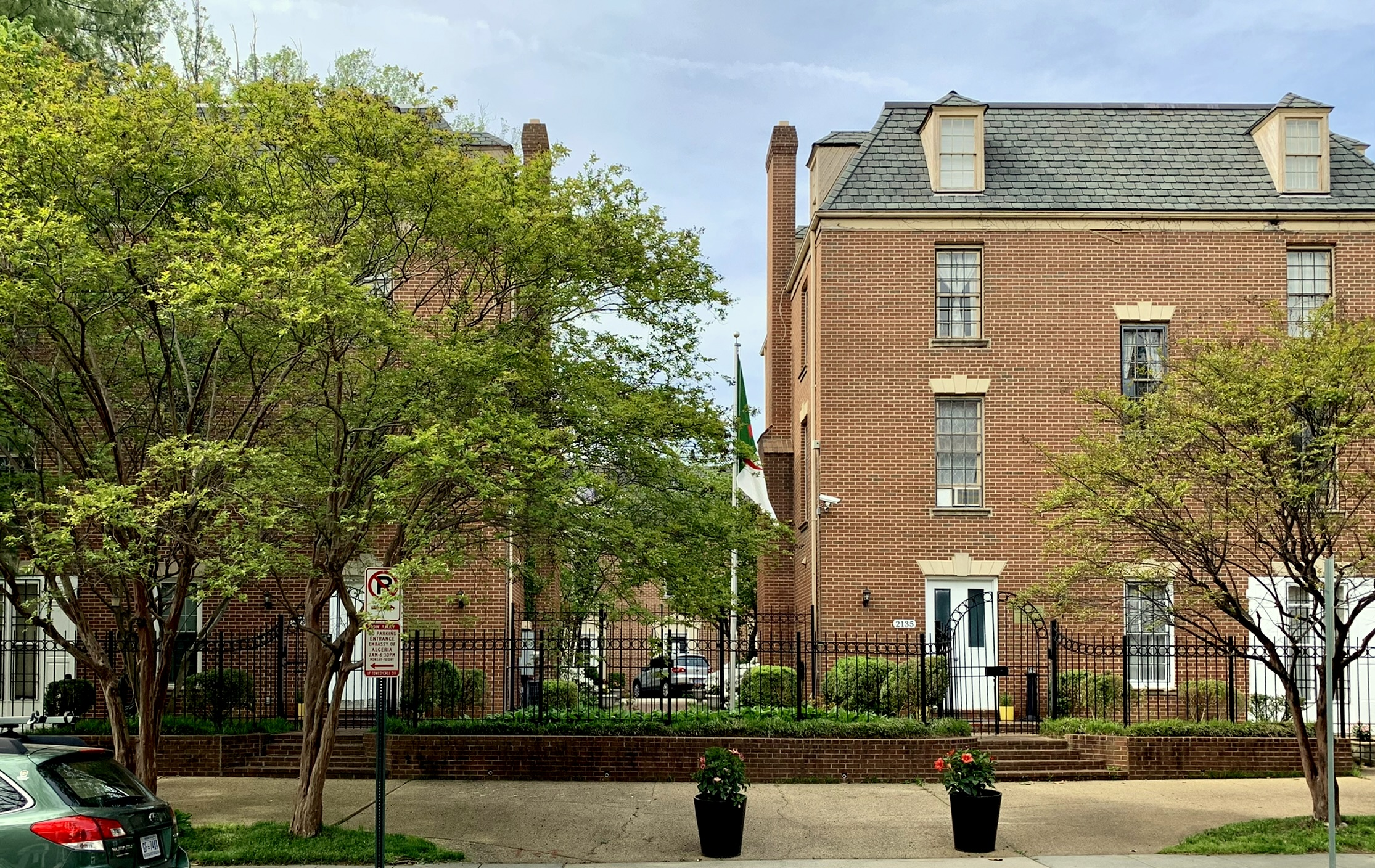
Embassy in Washington, D.C.

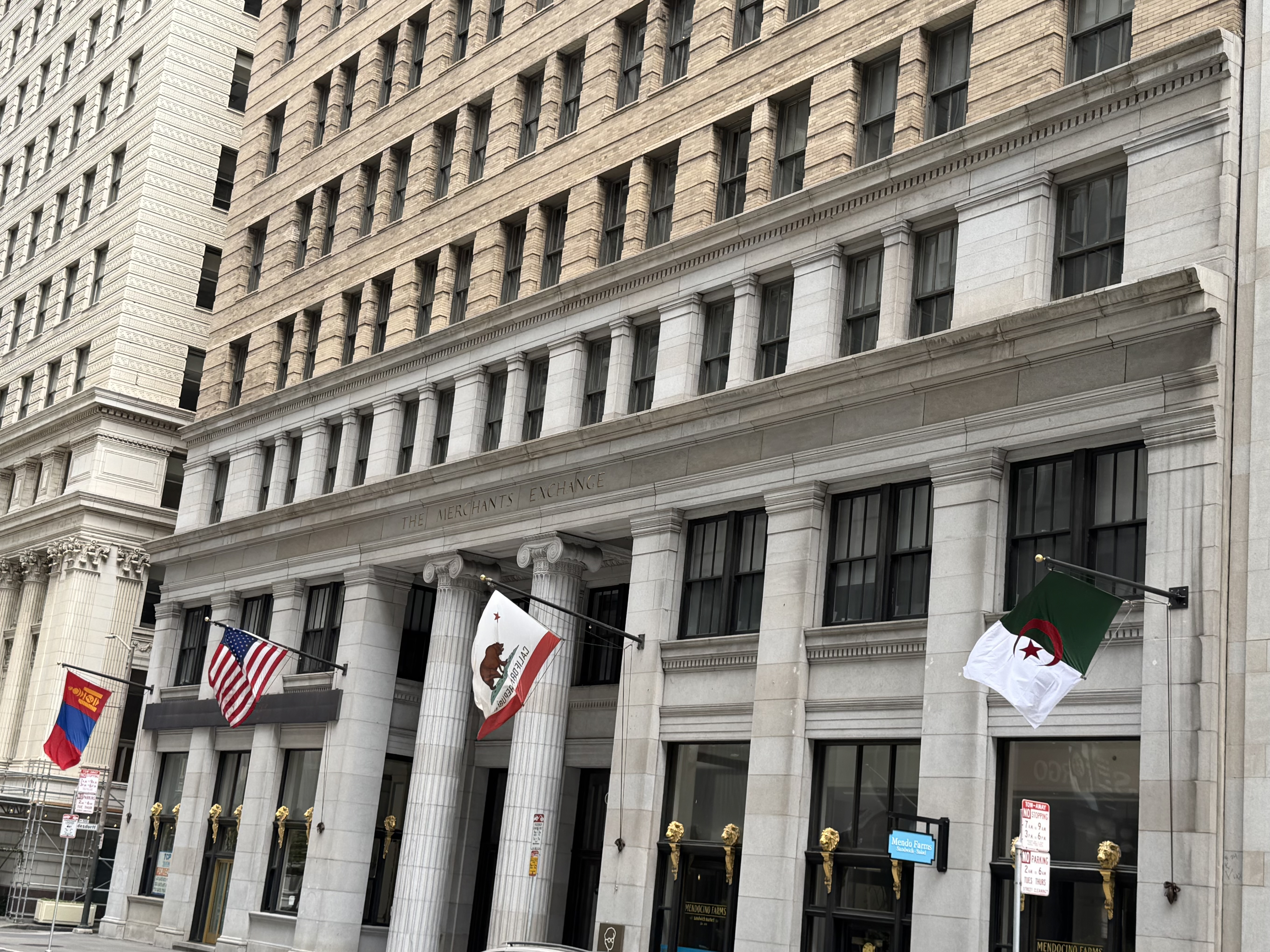
Building hosting the Consulate-General in San Francisco

== Non-resident embassies ==
1. Palestine (Cairo)

== Closed missions ==
=== Africa ===
Host country	Host city	Mission	Year closed	Ref.
Morocco	Rabat	Embassy	2021	

=== Asia ===
Host country	Host city	Mission	Year closed	Ref.
United Arab Emirates	Abu Dhabi	Embassy	2026	
United Arab Emirates	Dubai	Consulate-General	2026	
Yemen	Sana'a	Embassy	2015	

== See also ==
- Foreign relations of Algeria
- List of diplomatic missions in Algeria
- Visa policy of Algeria
