= Mona (name) =

- Pronunciation: /ˈmoʊnə/ MOH-nə
- Gender: Female/Male

Origin
- Meaning: various

Other names
- Related names: Monica, Ramona, Simona

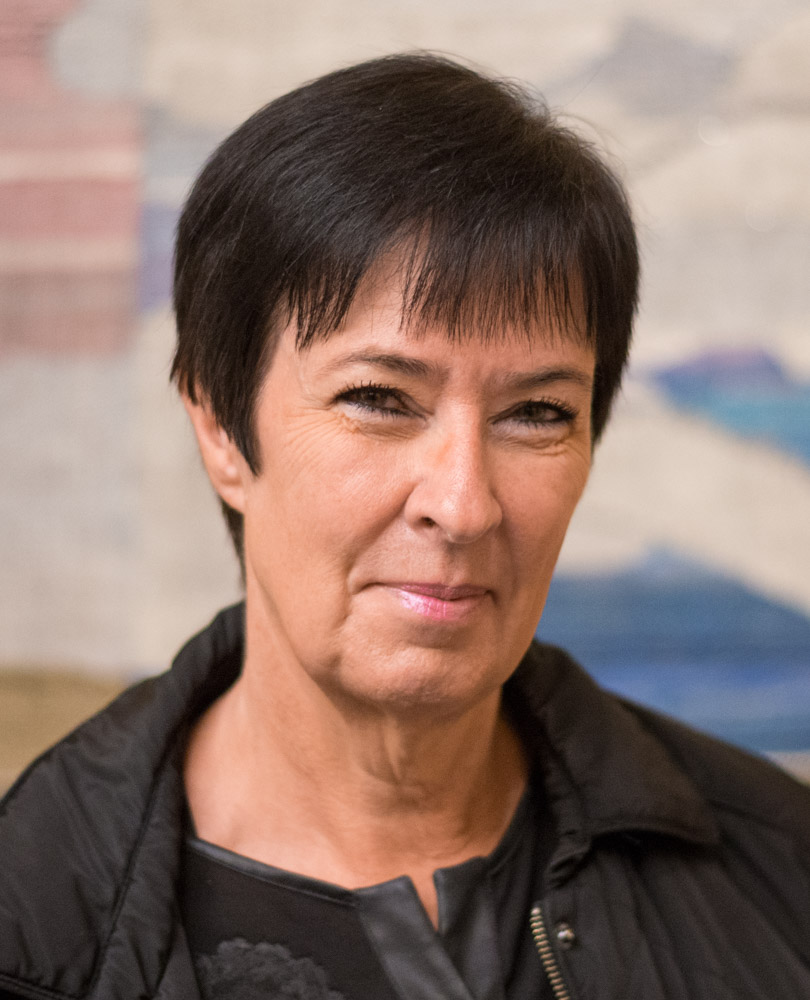
Mona Sahlin, 2015.

Mona or Muna is a unisex given name and surname of multiple origins. Notable people with the name include:

== Etymology ==
As a given name, Mona can have the following meanings and origins;

Language	Source	Meaning	Variant forms	Gender
Arabic	Variant transliteration of Muna (مُنى)	Wishes	Muna, Mouna	Female
Breton	Variant of Marivona			Female
Formosan: Atayal; Seediq				Atayal: Male; Seediq: Male and Female
Gaelic/Irish	Anglicized form of Muadhnait	Noble One	Monah, Monna, Monya	Female
Greek	Monos (μονος)	Solitary, One		Female
Early Italian	Contraction of the title Madonna	My lady		Female
Miwok		Gathered of the seed of a jimson weed.		Male and Female
Nepali		Wish	Muna	Female
Old English		Moon		Female
Persian	منا or مونا	An adjective for God, derives from Mana, means who lasts forever		Female
Scottish	Female form of Tormod, derived from Norman	Northman, Viking		Female
Sanskrit		Alone, silence		Female
Teutonic		Loner		Female
Japanese		Various		Female
Chinese		Various		Female

In northern Europe, where the name is much more popular, Mona is interpreted as a diminutive of Monika or, rarely, of Ramona or Simona. It is sometimes associated with the title of Leonardo da Vinci's painting Mona Lisa, although in that context the word Mona is actually a title rather than a name. The word mona also means cute, monkey and doll in Spanish. In Sweden, Mona's name day is May 4. Mona was a relatively popular given name in the United States in the 1930s, 1950s and 1960s. The highest ranking it ever reached in the US was #230, in 1950.

== Given name ==
=== Mona ===
- Mona (Angolan footballer) (born 1997), Angolan footballer
- Mona (Brazilian footballer) (born 1973), Brazilian footballer
- Mona (singer) (born 1996), Russian singer and songwriter
- Mona Kosar Abdi (born 1991), American journalist
- Mona Abul-Fadl (1945–2008), Egyptian scholar
- Mona Achache (born 1981), French-Moroccan film director, actress, and screenwriter
- Mona Adilman (1924–1991), Canadian poet
- Mona Agarwal (born 1987), Indian para shooter
- Mona Ainuu, Niuean politician
- Mona Alawi (born 2004), Filipino actress and model
- Mona Almoayyed, Bahraini businesswoman
- Mona Ambegaonkar (born 1970), Indian actress
- Mona Anderson (1909–2004), New Zealand writer
- Mona Arshi, British poet and novelist
- Mona Awad (born 1978), Canadian novelist and short story writer
- Mona Baker (born 1953), British-Egyptian scholar
- Mona Baptiste (1926–1993), Trinidad and Tobago singer and actress
- Mona Barrie (1905–1964), English actress
- Mona Barthel (born 1990), German professional tennis player
- Mona Bates (1889–1971), Canadian concert pianist and music instructor
- Mona A. El-Bayoumi (born 1962), Egyptian American painter and mixed media artist
- Mona Beaumont (1927–2007), French-born American painter, printmaker
- Mona Bell (1890–1981), American rodeo rider and newspaper reporter
- Mona Hopton Bell (1867–1940), British artist
- Mona Berciu, Romanian-Canadian physician
- Mona Berntsen (born 1990), Norwegian-Moroccan dancer
- Mona Best (1924–1988), British music club proprietor
- Mona Bhan, Indian anthropologists
- Mona von Bismarck (1897–1983) American socialite and fashion icon
- Mona Bollerud (born 1968), Norwegian biathlete
- Mona Borzouei (born 1984), Iranian poet and songwriter
- Mona Brand (1915–2007), Australian playwright, poet, and freelance writer
- Mona Breckmann (born 1991), Faroese footballer
- Mona Lee Brock (1932–2019), American school teacher, farm advocate, and crisis support counsellor
- Mona Brorsson (born 1990), Swedish biathlete
- Mona Elisabeth Brøther (born 1952), Norwegian diplomat
- Mona Bruns (1899–2000), American actress
- Mona Burgin (1903–1985), New Zealand teacher
- Mona Caird (1854–1932), English novelist, essayist, and social reformer
- Mona Chalabi (born 1987), British-Iraqi journalist
- Mona Charen (born 1957), American columnist and political analyst
- Mona Chollet (born 1973), Swiss journalist and author
- Mona Cliff (born 1977), American artist
- Mona Dahle (born 1970), Norwegian handball player
- Mona Darkfeather (1882–1977), American actress
- Mona Das (born 1971), American politician
- Mona Davids, American activist
- Mona Demaidi (born 1988), Palestinian entrepreneur and women's rights advocate
- Mona Denton (1922–1995), American baseball player
- Mona Derismahmoudi (born 1993), Iranian volleyball player
- Mona Diab, Egyptian computer scientist
- Mona Dol (1901–1990), French actress
- Mona Domosh (born 1957), American geographer and academic
- Mona Donaldson (1901–1985), Australian film editor
- Mona Douglas (1898–1987), British cultural activist, folklorist, poet, novelist, and journalist
- Mona Van Duyn (1921–2004), American poet
- Mona Eltahawy (born 1967), Egyptian-American activist
- Mona Fagerås (born 1972), Norwegian teacher and politician
- Mona Fandey (1956–2001), Malaysian singer and murderer
- Mona Farnsworth (1904–1981), American writer
- Mona Fastvold (born 1981), Norwegian filmmaker and actress
- Mona Fayad (born 1950), Lebanese intellectual, writer, and political activist
- Mona Fitzalan-Howard, 11th Baroness Beaumont (1894–1971), British peer
- Mona Fong (1934–2017), Hong Kong film and television producer
- Mona Fortier (born 1972), Canadian politician
- Mona N. Fouad, Egyptian-American physician
- Mona Francis (born 1990), French Para triathlete of Lebanese descent
- Mona Freeman (1926–2014), American actress and painter
- Mona Friedlander (1914–1993), British pilot
- Mona Geijer-Falkner (1887–1973), Swedish film actress
- Mona Ghaderi (born 1980), Iranian volleyball player
- Mona Ghoneim (born 1955), Egyptian composer
- Mona Golabek (born 1954), American concert pianist, author, and radio host
- Mona Gould (1905–1999), Canadian poet and broadcaster
- Mona Goya (1909–1961), Mexican-born French film actress
- Mona Greenwood (1901–1976), English cricketer
- Mona de Grenoble, Canadian drag queen
- Mona Grey (1910–2009), British nurse
- Mona Grudt (born 1971), former Miss Universe from Norway
- Mona Guérin (1934–2011), Haitian educator and writer
- Mona Chandravati Gupta (1896–1984), Burmese-born Indian social worker and educationist
- Mona Gustafsson (born 1956), Swedish singer, songwriter, and guitarist
- Mona Zandi Haghighi (born 1972), Iranian film director
- Mona Hala (born 1984), Egyptian-Austrian actress and hostess
- Mona Hammond (1931–2022), Jamaican-British actress
- Mona Hamoudi (born 1993), Iranian footballer
- Mona Abou Hamze (born 1972), Lebanese TV personality and presenter
- Mona Hanna (born 1976), British-Iraqi pediatrician, public health advocate, and Flint Water Crisis whistleblower
- Mona Hassanein (born 1985), Egyptian fencer
- Mona Hatoum (born 1952), British artist of Palestinian origin
- Mona El-Hawary (born 1962), Egyptian sport shooter
- Mona Haydar (born 1988), Syrian-American rapper, poet, activist, and chaplain
- Mona Hensman (1899–1991), Indian educator, feminist, and politician
- Mona Hessing (1933–2001), Australian fibre artist and weaver
- Mona Hinton (1919–2008), American educator, music contractor, and bookkeeper
- Mona Hofland (1929–2010), Norwegian actress
- Mona Holm (born 1983), Norwegian hammer thrower
- Mona Høvring (born 1962), Norwegian writer
- Mona Inglesby (1918–2006), British ballet dancer and choreographer
- Mona Ioane, Cook Islands politician
- Mona Jarrahi (born 1979), Iranian engineering professor
- Mona Jhaveri, American biotech scientist and entrepreneur
- Mona Johannesson (born 1987), Swedish model
- Mona Jönsson (born 1951), Swedish politician
- Mona Juul (born 1959), Norwegian diplomat and politician
- Mona Juul (Danish politician) (born 1967), Danish politician
- Mona Shourie Kapoor (1964–2012), Indian television and film producer
- Mona Kareem (born 1987), American writer, translator, and literary scholar
- Mona May Karff (1908–1998), American chess player
- Mona Karim, Lebanese actress
- Mona Kasra, American media artist, projection designer, and interdisciplinary scholar
- Mona Kattan (born 1985), Iraqi-American CEO
- Mona Keijzer (born 1968), Dutch politician
- Mona Kent (1909–1990), American writer of radio and television scripts
- Mona Khaled (born 1994), Egyptian chess player
- Mona Khalidi, American academic
- Mona Khalil (1949–2026), Lebanese conservationist, environmentalist, and biologist
- Mona Khazinder (born 1959), Saudi art curator and historian
- Mona Kim (born 1967), American-Korean designer
- Mona Kimura (born 2001), Japanese kickboxer and former amateur boxer
- Mona Knox (1929–2008), American model and film actress
- Mona Lena Krook, American political scientist
- Mona Kuhn (born 1969), Brazilian-born American photographer
- Mona al-Kuwari, Bahraini judge, academic, and author
- Mona Salyer Lambird (1938–1999), American lawyer
- Mona Latif-Ghattas (1946–2021), Egyptian-born Canadian writer
- Mona Leydon (1915–2002), New Zealand swimming representative
- Mona Limerick (1882–1968), Irish stage actress
- Mona Lohanda (1947–2021), Indonesian historian, archivist, and academic
- Mona Løseth (born 1991), Norwegian alpine skier
- Mona Loutfy, Canadian clinician-scientist and infectious disease specialist
- Mona Lynch, American criminologist
- Mona Lyngar (1944–2023), Norwegian novelist
- Mona MacLeod (1895–1953), Australian golfer
- Mona Mahmudnizhad (1965–1983), Iranian teen executed for membership of the Baha'i faith
- Mona Makram-Ebeid (born 1943), Egyptian politician and academic
- Mona Malm (1935–2021), Swedish film, stage, and television actress
- Mona Mansour, American playwright
- Mona al Mansouri, Emirati fashion designer and engineer
- Mona K. Marei, Egyptian researcher
- Mona Maris (1903–1991), Argentine film actress
- Mona Marshall, American voice actress
- Mona Mårtenson (1902–1956), Swedish film actress
- Mona Martin (born 1934), American politician
- Mona Martínez (born 1968), Spanish film and theatre actress
- Mona Masri (born 1985), Swedish-Lebanese journalist
- Mona Matsuoka (born 1998), Japanese-American fashion model
- Mona May, American costume designer
- Mona McBurney (1862–1932), British-Australian pianist, teacher, and composer
- Mona McKinnon (1929–1990), American film actress and model
- Mona McSharry (born 2000), Irish swimmer
- Mona Menzies (1920–??), Australian nursing administrator
- Mona Meraachli (1958–2016), Lebanese singer
- Mona Merling, Romanian-American mathematician
- Mona Meshram (born 1991), Indian cricketer
- Mona Minahan (1897–1996), Australian businesswoman
- Mona Minkara, American-Lebanese bioengineer and computational biophysicist
- Mona Rae Miracle (1919–2014), American author
- Mona Mitchell (1938–2002), British courtier
- Mona Mitterwallner (born 2002), Austrian mountain biker
- Mona Mostafa Mohamed, Egyptian doctor
- Mona Faiz Montrage (Mona 4Reall) (born 1993), Ghanaian socialite and musician
- Mona Monyane (born 1990), South African actress
- Mona Moore (1917–2000), British painter and illustrator
- Mona Morales-Schildt (1908–1999), Swedish designer and glass artist
- Mona Al Munajjed, Saudi sociologist
- Mona Mur (born 1960), German vocalist, composer, and audio designer
- Mona Muscă (born 1949), Romanian philologist and politician
- Mona Rockman Napaljarri (born 1924), Australian artist
- Mona Nemer (born 1957), Lebanese-Canadian scientist
- Mona Neubaur (born 1977), German politician
- Mona Nicoară, Romanian film director and producer
- Mona Nilsen (born 1973), Norwegian politician
- Mona Berglund Nilsson (born 1942), Swedish politician
- Mona Nørgaard (born 1948), Danish orienteering competitor
- Mona Obaidli (born 1997), Norwegian handball player
- Mona Ofeich (born 1943), Lebanese lawyer
- Mona Oikawa, Canadian writer and professor
- Mona Olin (born 1967), Swedish politician
- Mona Anita K. Olsen, British-American entrepreneur and academic
- Mona Ombogo, Kenyan screenwriter, author, and blogger
- Mona K. Oram (1874–1949), English stage actress
- Mona Asuka Ott (born 1991), German-Japanese pianist
- Mona Ozouf (born 1931), French historian and philosopher
- Mona Paad (born 1974), Iranian sculptor, soprano singer, translator, and industrial design engineer
- Mona Louise Parsons (1901–1976), Canadian actress, nurse, and resistance member
- Mona Pasquil (born 1962), American politician
- Mona Perreault, American politician
- Mona Pivniceru, Romanian politician and judge
- Mona Plummer (1928–1985), American swim coach
- Mona Polacca (born 1955), Native American spiritual elder
- Mona Susan Power (born 1961), American author
- Mona Pretorius (born 1988), South African weightlifter
- Mona Ratuliu (born 1982), Indonesian actress and presenter
- Mona Ray (1905–1986), American stage and screen actress
- Mona Lyn Reese (born 1951), American composer
- Mona Richardson (1947–1985), American singer and actress
- Mona Rico (1907–1994), Mexico-born American actress
- Mona Røkke (1940–2013), Norwegian politician
- Mona Rudao (1880–1930), Taiwanese revolutionary
- Mona Jean Russell (1917–2008), American lawyer and politician
- Mona Rüster (1901–1976), German table tennis player
- Mona Al Sabban (born 1945), Egyptian scholar
- Mona El-Saghir, Egyptian television presenter
- Mona Sahlin (born 1957), Swedish politician
- Mona El Said (1954–2024), Egyptian belly dancer and actress
- Mona Magdi Salim, Sudanese singer
- Mona Santoso (born 1982), Indonesian badminton player
- Mona Saudi (1945–2022), Jordanian sculptor, publisher, and art activist
- Mona Scott-Young (born 1967), American television producer and entrepreneur
- Mona Seefried, Austrian actress
- Mona Seif (born 1986), Egyptian human rights activist
- Mona Seilitz (1943–2008), Swedish film and television actress and entertainer
- Mona Shaito (born 1994) Lebanese-American fencer
- Mona al-Shammari (born 1966), Kuwaiti novelist and writer
- Mona Shattell, American professor of nursing
- Mona el-Shazly (born 1973), Egyptian talk show host
- Mona Ghosh Shetty, Indian dubbing artist and dubbing director
- Mona Siddiqui (born 1963), British academic
- Mona L. Siegel, American scholar, author, and historian
- Mona León Siminiani (born 1974), Spanish actress and screenwriter
- Mona Simion, British philosopher
- Mona Simpson (born 1957), American novelist of Syrian and German descent
- Mona Singh (born 1981), Indian actress, comedian, and television presenter
- Mona Singh (scientist), American computer scientist
- Mona Smedman (born 1975), Swedish politician
- Mona Smith (artist), American artist, storyteller, and documentary producer
- Mona Solheim (born 1979), Norwegian taekwondo practitioner
- Mona Steigauf (born 1970), German heptathlete
- Mona Sulaiman (1942–2017), Filipina sprinter
- Mona Sutphen (born 1967), American government official
- Mona Al-Tamimi, Emirati author
- Mona Tougaard (born 2002), Danish fashion model
- Mona Tracy (1892–1959), New Zealand novelist, journalist, poet, and community worker
- Mona Ngitji Ngitji Tur (1936–2011), Australian writer and educator
- Mona Tyndall (1921–2000), Irish medical doctor
- Mona Ullmann (born 1967), Norwegian paralympic athlete
- Mona Vangsaae (1920–1983), Danish ballet dancer, choreographer, and instructor
- Mona Vasquez (1960–2011), French activist
- Mona Vasu (born 1982), Indian actress
- Mona Vivian (1894–1971), English pantomime stage artist
- Mona Wallén-Hjerpe (1932–2008), Swedish author and criminal
- Mona Walter (born 1973), Swedish activist, critic of Islam, and social commentator
- Mona Washbourne (1903–1988), English actress
- Mona Chalmers Watson (1872–1936), British physician
- Mona Weissmark (born 1954), American clinical psychologist and social psychologist
- Mona Wessman (born 1948), Swedish singer
- Mona Williams (writer, born 1905) (1905–1991), American novelist and poet
- Mona Williams (writer, born 1943) (born 1943), Guyanese-New Zealand storyteller and educator
- Mona Wilson (1872–1954), British public servant and author
- Mona Gordon Wilson (1894–1981), Canadian public health nurse
- Mona Winberg (1932–2009), Canadian journalist and disability rights activist
- Mona Yahia (born 1954), Iraqi writer and artist
- Mona Yamamoto (born 1976), Japanese TV announcer and presenter
- Mona Zaalouk (1947–1995), Egyptian painter, tapestry designer
- Mona Zaghloul, Egyptian-American electronics engineer
- Mona Zaki (born 1977), Egyptian actress
- Mona Al-Zayani, Bahraini educator and politician
- Mona Zulficar, Egyptian lawyer and human rights activist

=== Muna ===
- Muna AbuSulayman (born 1973), American-Saudi businesswoman and activist
- Muna Jabir Adam (born 1987), Sudanese track and field athlete
- Muna Dahouk (born 1995), Syrian-Dutch judoka
- Muna Durka (born 1988), Sudanese steeplechase runner
- Muna Duzdar (born 1978), Austrian politician
- Muna Al Gurg, Emirati businesswoman and philanthropist
- Muna Al Hashemi (born 1971), Bahraini businesswoman
- Muna Hawwa, Palestinian blogger and journalist
- Muna Jabbur (1942–1964), Lebanese novelist
- Muna Katupose (born 1988), Namibian footballer
- Muna Khalif, Somali-American entrepreneur, fashion designer, and legislator
- Muna el-Kurd (born 1998), Palestinian activist
- Muna Lee (sprinter) (born 1981), American sprinter
- Muna Lee (writer) (1895–1965), American poet, author, and activist
- Muna Luqman, Yemeni activist
- Muna Thapa Magar, Nepalese folk singer
- Muna Obiekwe (1979–2015), Nigerian actor
- Muna Otaru (born 1978), British actress
- Muna al-Sheemi (born 1968), Egyptian writer
- Muna Singh (1970–2023), Zambian rally driver
- Muna Tseng, Chinese-American dancer, choreographer, author, and lecturer
- Muna Wassef (born 1942), Syrian actress

== Surname ==
- Domenico Mona (1550–1602), Italian painter
- István Móna (1940–2010), Hungarian modern pentathlete
- Khwezi Mona (born 1992), South African rugby union player

== Fictional characters ==
- Mona, a character in 2020 video game Genshin Impact
- Mona Dearly, played by Bette Midler in the 2000 film Drowning Mona
- Mona Mayfair in several novels by Anne Rice
- Mona McCluskey, main character in television sitcom of the same name
- Mona Parker, the main character in the animated television series Mona the Vampire and the book of the same name
- Mona Sax in the Max Payne franchise
- Mona Simpson (The Simpsons), Homer Simpson's estranged mother
- Mona Sterling Pike, Roger Sterling's first wife on Mad Men
- Mona Vanderwaal in the original Pretty Little Liars book and television series

== See also ==
- Mona (disambiguation)
- Monna (name)
- Monica (given name)
- Mouna (given name)
- Muna (disambiguation)
