= Women in the Arab world =

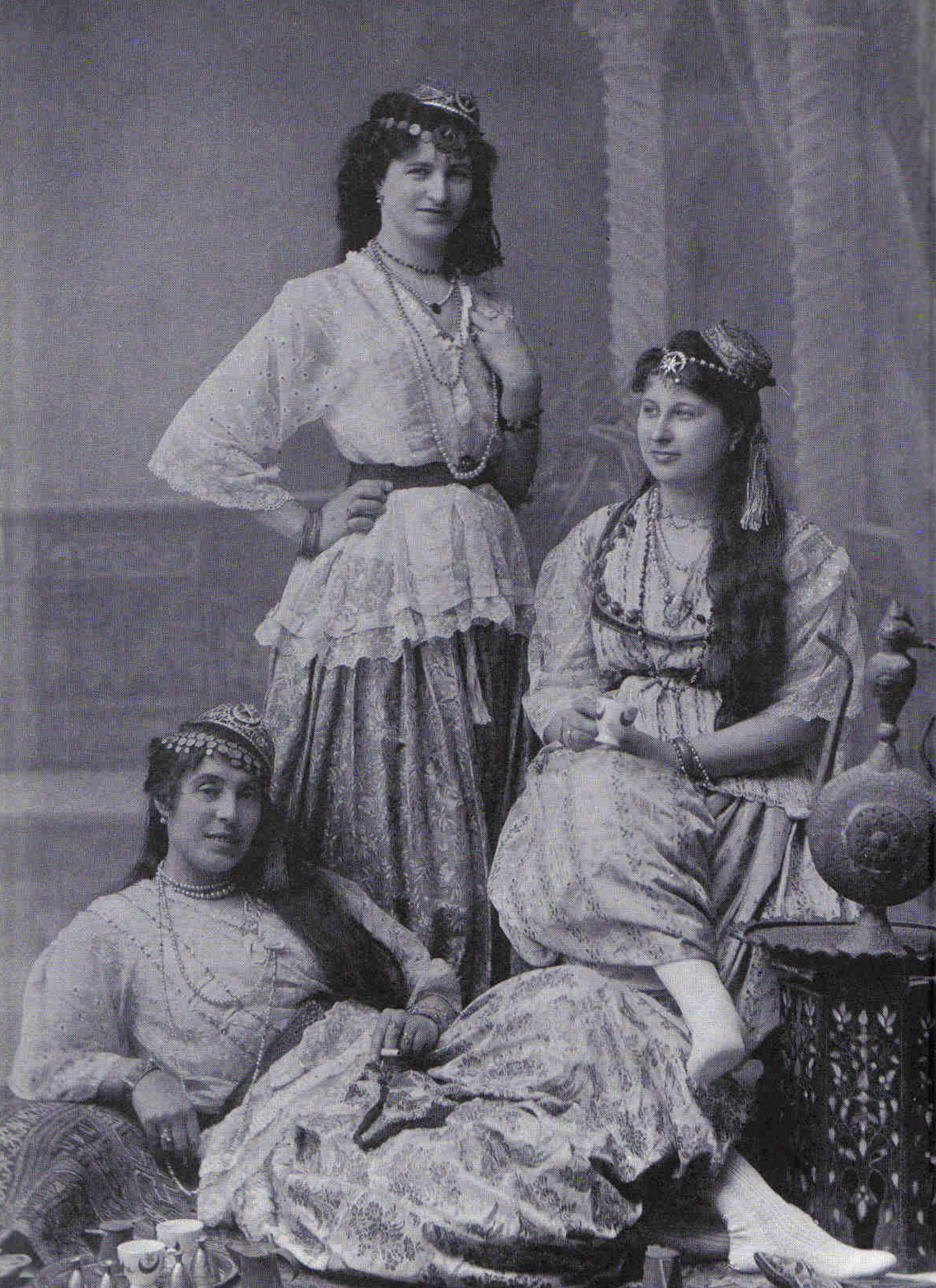
Three women from Algiers in the 1880s; the reclining girl holds a cigarette.

Women in the Arab world refers to the lifestyle, living conditions and status of women in the geographically large Arab world which spans from Maghreb region in western Africa all the way to Gulf states across the Arabian sea covering span of two continents of Asia and Africa. The experiences for women in Arab world differ significantly owing to socio-political, economic and cultural differences across the Arab League member states, indicating that there is no universal experience for Arab women.

Historically, the status of women has changed significantly. From the pre-Islamic era, where tribal customary laws were differing, from Nabataean female autonomy to oppressive practices like female infanticide. Early Islamic reforms established women's legal personhood, independent property rights, and inheritance shares. However, subsequent centuries saw a gradual increase of women being pushed into more private, home-centred spheres due to evolving local customs and patriarchal structures. Accelerated social and economic transformations began in the 19th and 20th centuries, which were heavily influenced by colonisation, decolonisation, and the Arab Reinassance (Nahda) and further complexified the role of women in the Arab world.

In the contemporary Arab world, these complexities become evident by a contrast between seemingly institutionalised public progress and lingering private restrictions:

- Education and Health: Female literacy and higher education rates have increased across the region, with women now heavily outnumbering men in universities in several Gulf states and entering STEM fields. This trend seems to be directly related to the richness in oil of the countries. Women in oil-rich Gulf countries have become increasingly educated, while young Muslim women in Mali, for example, have shown a significantly lower increase.
- Economy and Travel: Despite high education levels, the region, particularly the Mashreq, historically maintains some of the lowest female labour force participation rates globally.
- Politics and Law: political representation varies; while countries like Tunisia have implemented strict constitutional protections for gender equality, women remain underrepresented in governance. Regionally, women's public rights are increasingly guaranteed by law, yet the private sphere often remains anchored in traditional or patriarchal interpretations of Islamic jurisprudence.

Although there have been improvements as reported in the UN Arab Development Reports, societal challenges persist, including gender-based violence, traditional customs that restrict autonomy in conservative areas, and practices like female genital mutilation in specific sub-regions. Modern regional activists and organisations continue to push for legal and social reforms, while post-colonial and transitional feminists caution against evaluating Arab women through reductionist, Western-centric stereotypes that paint them purely as passive victims.

== History of women in the Arab world ==
=== Women in Pre-Islamic Arabia (before 610 CE) ===
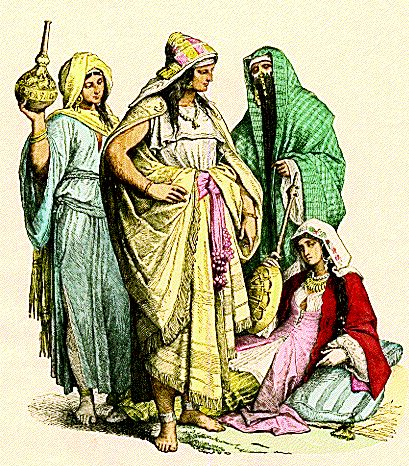
Costumes of Arab women, fourth to sixth century.

The status of women in pre-Islamic Arabia had been a subject of much scholarly debate. Under the customary tribal law existing in Arabia at the advent of Islam, women as a general rule had virtually no legal status. They could be sold into marriage, lacked rights to property or inheritance, and faced unilateral divorce by their husbands. Practices such as female infanticide, unlimited polygyny and patrilineal marriage further reflected the vulnerable positions of women in Arabia.

However, not all pre-Islamic societies were oppressive toward women. Historian Hatoon al-Fassi comes to the conclusion that in the Nabataean kingdom, women had significant legal autonomy. They were allowed to own property and to conduct business independently. She states that much of this autonomy vanished in the ancient Greek and Roman time even before the advent of Islam.

In pre-Islamic Arabia, women's status varied depending on the tribe they belonged to. In some tribes, women were emancipated even in comparison with many of today's standards. There have been cases where women held high positions of power and authority. The Queen of Sheba, or Biqlis, likely rules the Sabaean kingdom in Yemen. Inscriptions form the region confirm that women could be monarchs. Also the Queen of Zenobia of Palmyra, in the third century CE, led a rebellion against Rome and briefly ruled much of the Eastern Empire. Though her Arab identity is debated, Roman sources link her her Arab ancestry.

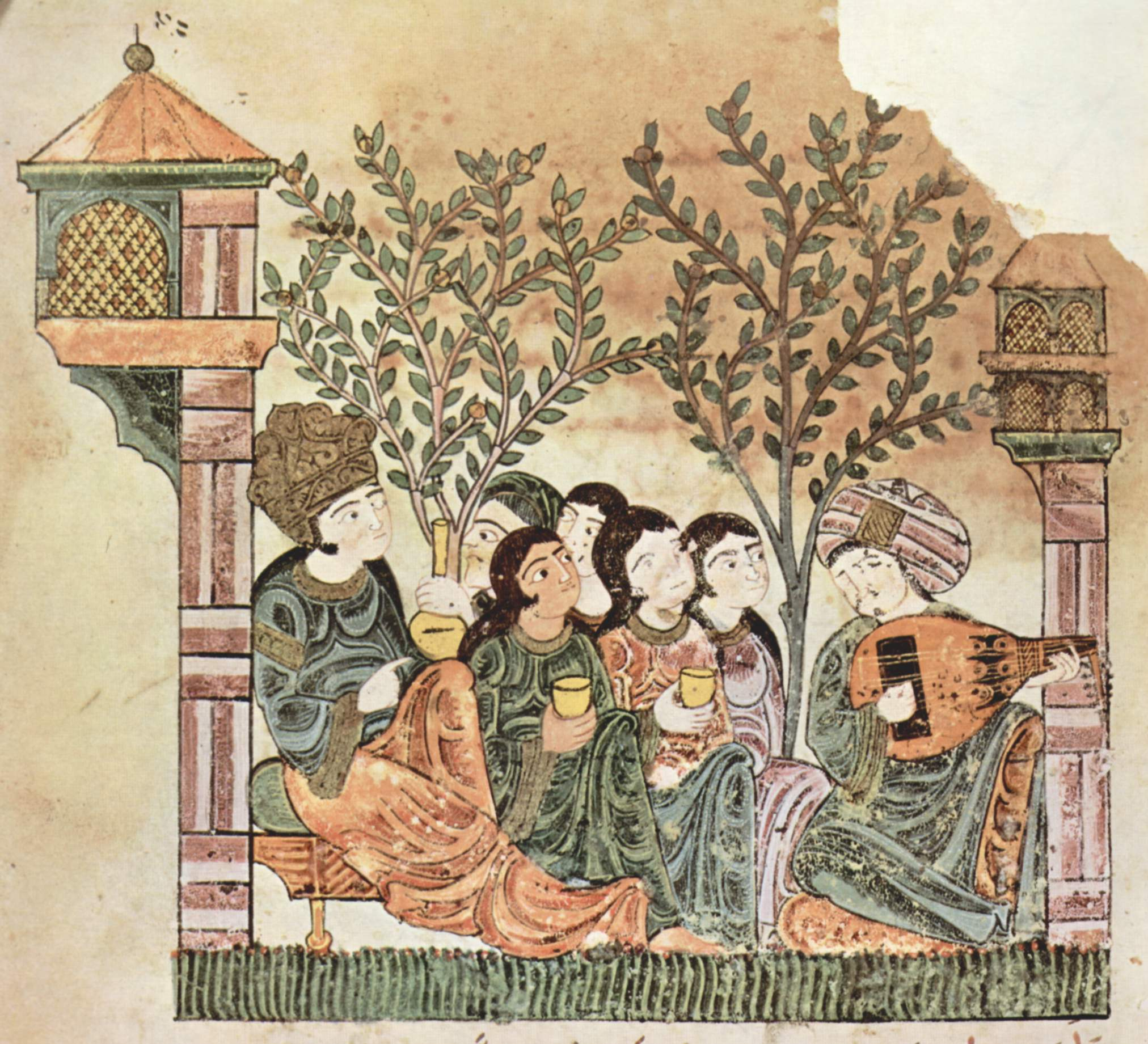
A page from an Arabic manuscript from the 12th century, depicting a man playing the oud among women, (Hadith Bayad wa Riyad).

=== Status of Women Before and After the Rise of Islam (610-632 CE) ===
The rise of Islam also accompanied the rise of women’s rights in the Arab world: the doctrines of Islam guaranteed rights to women that weren’t available before the development of the religion. Women received full legal personhood, and marriages needed the woman's consent.

Islam has also reshaped the way people value girls and infants: before Islam, female infanticide was common, but the revelation “To Allah belongs the dominion of the heavens and the earth. He creates what He wills. He grants to whom He wills female [children], and He grants to whom He wills males…” of the Quran reshaped this notion with the verses of 42:49–50, which explicitly said, that both female and male children are a gift from Allah.

In addition, the Quran has prescribed rights for women, such as rights of ownership, inheritance, marriage, and finance, and has earned more respect for women among men in general.

Elizabeth Fernea and Yvonne Haddad have similarly noted that Muhammad granted women privileges in family life, marriage, education, and economic participation, laying a foundation for future advancements in women's rights in the Islamic world. Valentine M. Moghadam analyzes the situation of women from a Marxist theoretical framework and argues that the position of women is mostly influenced by the extent of urbanization, industrialization, proletarianization, and political ploys of the state managers rather than culture or intrinsic properties of Islam. Moghadam added that Islam is neither more nor less patriarchal than other world religions especially Christianity and Judaism.

=== Women in the Arab World in the Early Caliphates (632–750 CE) ===
With the rise of Islam in the seventh century, the status of women improved markedly. The Qur’an affirms the spiritual equality of men and women stating: "I will not suffer to be lost the work of any of you whether male or female. You proceed one from another" (Qur'an 3:195) Islam prohibited practices like female infanticide and emphasized the dignity and moral responsibility of women and declared them as morally equal in God's view, which made their status in society more important. Islam provided women with rights that men must fulfill upon them, such as the dowry, inheritance, and financial maintenance in divorce, and condemned the practice of female infanticide and abuse.

The Prophet Muhammad's own life reflected a commitment to women's rights. His first wife Khadija bint Khuwaylid was a successful businesswomen who supported Muhammed emotionally and also financially. His wife was also the first to convert to Islam. Muhammed spoke highly of women, emphasizing kindness and fairness in marriage, and stressing the elevated status of mothers and daughters. Prophet Muhammad himself stated that the best of men were those that were best to their wives. He also stated that those who had three daughters and supported them and showed them mercy was guaranteed Paradise (Al-Albani), and his only form of lineage was through his daughter Fatima. This shows the emphasis on the importance of daughters.

In the early Arab Caliphates, the labor force was diverse, with individuals from different ethnic and religious backgrounds participating in various sectors. Women were employed in a wide range of commercial activities and diverse occupations. Women were involved in numerous occupations, from commerce and craftsmanship to agricultural management. Historical evidence shows women operated business, worked as market inspectors, and even traveled as traders across vast distances.

Women's economic position was strengthened by the Qur'an by granting them the right to own property, manage wealth independently and inherit assets. But local custom has weakened that position in their insistence that women must work within the private sector of the world. As Fatima Mernissi notes in The Veil and the Male Elite, while Islamic law originally provided women with notable economic autonomy, societal pressures increasingly pushed women toward private, home-centered spheres.

During the caliphate of Umar ibn al-Khattāb in 634-644 CE, women were not only active participants in public life. They were trusted with institutional responsibilities. One example is al-Shifā bint Abdullāh, a literate and respected woman. She was made 'muhtasiba' (market inspector), granting her authority to oversee commercial practices and public morality in the bustling markets of Medina. This role was typically held by men. Some sources also mention Umar established a women's complaints office, which reflected recognition of women's voices in governance. These actions show that early Islamic governance acknowledged women's agency.

Public life was not closed to women either. In the 12th century, the most famous Islamic philosopher and qadi (judge) Ibn Rushd advocated that women were intellectually and physically equal to men. He was known to the West as Averroes. He criticized social systems that marginalized women's talents and cited historical examples of female warriors among Arabs, Greeks and Africans.

Examples form early Islamic history further confirm women's involvement in public affairs. Women such as Nusaybah Bint k’ab Al Maziniyyah fought during the Muslim conquests as soldiers or generals. Aisha bint Abi Bakr played a significant political role during the first Fitna (civil war) and others like Kahula and Wafeira participated actively in military campaigns.

=== Women in the Arab World in Early Modern to Pre-colonial period (1500-1900) ===
The professional fields also saw pioneering women. Sabat M. Islambouli (1867–1941) was one of the first Syrian female physicians. She was a Kurdish Jew from Syria. This shows that even under restrictive conditions women found ways to assert themselves in traditionally male-dominated spheres.

The historical experiences of women in Arabia reveal complex layers of religious, social and political challenges that evolved over time. The many challenges that Arab women face are restricted access to education which later affects their job opportunities, violence, forced marriages, not enough chances to participate in the public life of their country, and last, but certainly not least - inheritance rights.

=== Women in the Arab World in the 20th Century Transformations (1900-2000 CE) ===
Historical and social differences amongst the Arab countries have led to varied social developments in the 20th century, leading to the existence of important differences in contemporary levels of economic and political welfare that reflect on women's status. Altogether, and despite considerable strides taken by Arab countries, the gender gap on women's political and economic participation and their access to education remains compelling. Notoriously, the Arab Human Development Reports design women's empowerment as one of the major deficits in the Arab world.

While women's participation in the labor force has seen some growth since the 1990s, unemployment rates among women have remained stubbornly high, largely due to kinds of jobs available and persistent societal discrimination. Arab women are both victims of gender relations benefitting men and struggling with the problems and challenges left behind by the colonial rule. In this context, some Arab women, positioning themselves as Islamic feminists, are evolving critical rhetorical strategies to analyse and address their situation, declaring a double commitment to their religious community and to themselves as strong and active women

Violence against women in the Arab world is another profound challenge, or better said, problem in the Arab world. This violence manifests both domestically and institutionally, as women often suffer not only within their families, but also in the hands of the state. One key factor behind this systemic abuse is the notion of ta’ah (obedience), a religious and cultural concept that, despite asserting equality before God, imposes unequal roles and duties on men and women. In practice, ta’ah has been used to justify male dominance and even physical abuse, with women encouraged to remain obedient to maintain family cohesion.

Throughout history, women in the Arab countries have always experienced difficulties exercising their rights. Some countries, such as Saudi Arabia, managed to achieve considerable progress in promoting women's rights, such as the right to vote or run in municipal elections. In Tunisia, however, a conservative Islamist party was introduced which struck Arab women worryingly, since they view this change as an obstacle to their possibility of further advancement.

In the Middle Eastern countries, patriarchal norms deeply embedded within the societies often indicate gender roles, limiting women's autonomy and participation in public life. In Jordan, for instance, cultural and religious beliefs significantly influence women's decisions to engage in research activities. A study revealed that 69.1% of female university students felt they lacked full autonomy to decide on participating in research studies, especially those requiring interactions outside the home or with male researchers adequate child care support contribute to low female Labor force participation.

We see this similarity in Syria. Despite women's increased workforce participation due to war, sectarian violence and traditional societal elements have raised concerns about the future of women's rights. Activist like Hanin Ahmad and lawyer Dima Moussa continue to advocate for gender equality, but public discrimination against women remains prevalent.

In Iraq, women encounter legal restrictions codified in personal status laws and a patriarchal social order that restricts their rights. Iraqi women face significant challenges including limited political representation and threats of violence, which undermine their efforts to engage fully in rebuilding civil society post-conflit.

We see that in Lebanon political instability and sectarian divisions further complicate women's rights and public participation. Legal frameworks usc as personal status law vary by religious affiliation and often discriminate against women in matters of marriage, divorce, and inheritance. This affects their ability to fully engage in public and political spheres.

Egypt was the first Arab country where Arab feminism emerged: after independence, Egyptian women started a social movement under the Egyptian Feminist Union and started conveying pan-Arab feminist meetings in Cairo

However, within Egypt, both Islamists and secular movements and parties still view religion as the main point of reference for women's rights; they only differ in their interpretation and implementation of the texts. Since Sadat's era, there have been confrontations between multiple actors over who has the authority to represent Egyptian women's issues and how to best address them.

One of the central issues Egyptian women's rights activists focus on is the shari’a-based Personal Status Law (PSL), which regulates marriage, divorce, engagement, guardianship, and custody. In 1979, a reform of the PSL included groundbreaking changes, such as granting women the right to judicial divorce due to their husbands’ second marriage. Another reform of PSL occurred in 2000 under Hosni Mubarak's regime granting women more rights, such as being able to unilaterally divorce their husbands (known as Khul’). Like the reforms in the seventies, these reforms faced opposition from the Muslim Brotherhood, Al-Azhar, and various other entities.

Additionally, female genital mutilation still involves a huge number of women, with 2024 UNICEF reports estimating that over 230 million women, have been subject to FGM procedures.

Tunisia's Personal Status Code, enacted by President Bourguiba in 1956 and strengthened by several important reforms over the years (the right to adoption, the right to abortion, and girls’ access to education) has made the country a pioneer in advancing women's rights in Arab countries. Tunisia's 2014 constitution is particularly favourable to women; however, women's political representation remains very low (12% in 2003) and the country only ranked 117 in the 2017 Gender Gap Report.

In Morocco, the first Family Code established after independence established a return to Islamic law, and legal reforms on women's rights were only made in 2005, and they have met with resistance from the ulama and the conservative courts.

In Algeria, the first Family Code was introduces in 1984, and it sanctioned polygamy and spousal repudiation; reforms aiming at greater rights for women came after the civil war, between 2005 and 2015, and they concerned the Family Code, the Nationality Code, political participation of women and violence against women.

The Gulf countries (Bahrain, Kuwait, Iraq, Oman, Qatar, Saudi Arabia, UAE) have adopted significant steps to promote gender equality in the last years: they have all ratified the UN CEDAW, albeit with some reservations. They have taken important strides in improving women's literacy rates: in 2009 Bahrain achieved 100% literacy rate for women between 15 and 24, Kuwait achieved 99%, Oman and Qatar 98%, Saudi Arabia and the UAE 97%. Women's participation in the workforce has increased considerably, as well as women's political participation and representation

In the Emirati, reforms in the Personal Status Law have enhanced women's rights in divorce, child custody, and financial independence. However, discriminations remain. For instance, laws still give male guardians authority over women and there are shorter sentences for men who kill a female relative than for women who kill male relatives.

In Saudi Arabia, recent reforms in the guardianship system, which once required women to seek male permission for various activities, have been relaxed, and laws amended to ensure fairer divorce and child custody processes

However, the PSL introduced in 2022 enshrined women's legal need for permission of a male guardian to marry or divorce, and married women's obligation to obey their husband "in a reasonable manner" .On the plus side, the law did set the minimum age at which women can marry at 18.

Gulf countries have also granted political participation, including in high-level decision-making. Today, there are female ministers in Bahrain, Oman, Qatar, Kuwait, and the UAE.

== Women in the contemporary Arab world ==
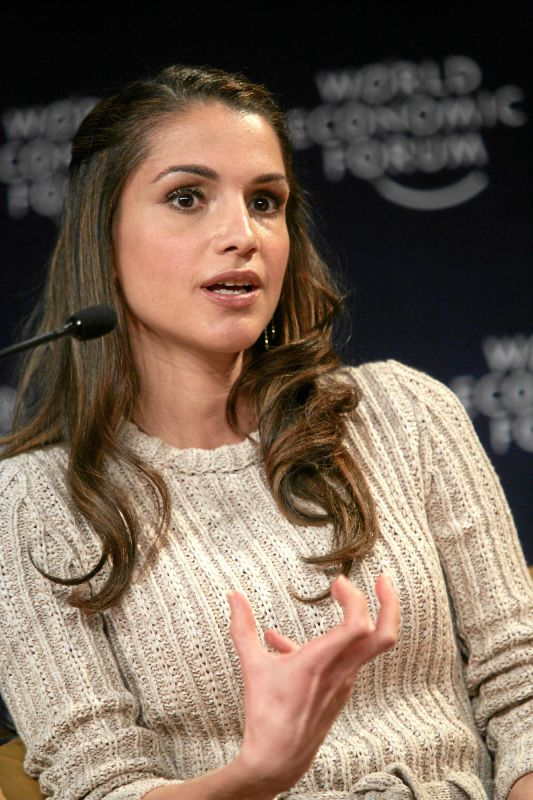
Queen Rania Al-Abdullah of Jordan

=== Politics ===
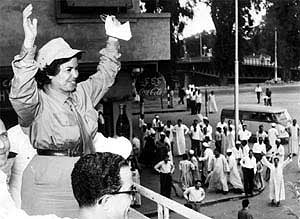
Egyptian politician Rawya Ateya, in military dress, waves to her supporters during her 1957 parliamentary electoral campaign. She ended up winning in her Cairo constituency, thereby becoming the first ever female Member of Parliament in Egypt and the Arab world.

The first Arab woman head of state is Najla Bouden, who was democratically elected prime minister of Tunisia in 2021. Furthermore, many Arab women, although not head of states themselves, stressed the importance of women in the public sphere, such as the wife of Anwar Sadat in Egypt, and Wassila Bourguiba, the wife of Habib Bourguiba in Tunisia, who have strongly influenced their husbands in dealings the matters of state. Arab countries allow women to vote in national elections. In this regard, the first female Member of Parliament in the Arab world was Rawya Ateya, who was elected in Egypt in 1957. Some countries granted the female franchise in their constitutions following independence, while some extended the franchise to women in later constitutional amendments.

Arab women are under-represented in parliaments in Arab states, although they are gaining more equal representation as Arab states liberalise their political systems. In 2005, the International Parliamentary Union said that 6.5 per cent of MPs in the Arabic-speaking world were women, up from 3.5 per cent in 2000. The representation of woman in Arab parliaments varies: in Tunisia, nearly 23 per cent of members of parliament were women; however, in Egypt, this was only 4 per cent. Algeria has the largest female representation in parliament of the Arab states, with 32 per cent.

In 2006 in UAE, women stood for election for the first time in the country's history. Although just one female candidate – from Abu Dhabi – was directly elected, the government appointed a further eight women to the 40-seat federal legislature, giving women a 22.5 per cent share of the seats, far higher than the world average of 17.0 per cent.

In the Arab Summit in Tunisia that was held on May 10, 2004, Arab leaders, for the first time, discussed the issue of advancing Arab women as an essential element of the political and economic development of the Arabic-speaking world.

Furthermore, Arab First Ladies have called for greater empowerment of women in the Arab World so that females could stand in an approximate equal position as males.

The role of women in politics in Arab societies is largely determined by the will of these countries' leaderships to support female representation and cultural attitudes towards women's involvement in public life. Women as head state or chief executive is in the Quran and Sunnah, neither permitted nor forbidden. Rather this deliberate silence means that Islam grants the Muslim community complete freedom and direction to decide. Dr Rola Dashti, a female candidate in Kuwait's 2006 parliamentary elections, claimed that "the negative cultural and media attitude towards women in politics" was one of the main reasons why no women were elected. She also pointed to "ideological differences", with conservatives and extremist Islamists opposing female participation in political life and discouraging women from voting for a woman. She also cited malicious gossip, attacks on the banners and publications of female candidates, lack of training, and corruption as barriers to electing female MPs. In contrast, one of UAE's female MPs, Najla al Awadhi, claimed that "women's advancement is a national issue and we have a leadership that understands that and wants them to have their rights."

Lebanon in 2019 elected its first female interior of state minister, becoming the first woman to hold this important position.

=== The poor representation and solutions ===
In Jordan, Princess Basma Bint Talal initiated the establishment of the Jordanian National Commission for Women (JNCW) in 1992. The Commission being highest policy-making institute in Jordan, it tackled on women's political, legislative, economic, social, educational, and health rights and issues.

In Lebanon, the Convention on the Elimination of all forms of Discrimination Against Women (CEDAW), is striving to eliminate laws, traditions, and customs that are intended to or otherwise result in gender-based discrimination.

The Women's Learning Partnership (WLP) in Morocco proposed a national plan to integrate women into the country's economic development — the Plan d’action National pour l’integration de la Femme au Development (PANDIF).

Lastly in Saudi Arabia, the Nahda Charitable Society for Women seeks the empowerment of women within the framework of Islamic law.

The woman in the Arab countries has the lowest participation in politics in the world, and if she gains a chance for a high position, the soft issues such as social affairs and women's issues are mostly her only choices. This is mostly due to the inherent social patriarchal attributes and the stereotype of the women in this region. This absence in politics poses many problems, such as loss of gender rights, and could increase the social inequalities and thus weakens the quality of life, which are represented in several factors such as poor health, education, economy, and the environment. Moreover, this lack of awareness hinders effective female political participation since it limits the ability for women to advocate for their interests and act as a sociopolitical actor. Some studies confirmed the importance and transformational role that women's quotas provide to women in Arab countries. Yet, working to change the stereotype image of Arab women through official and social media, is one of the proposed solutions to achieve a positive increase in women's political representation in the Arabic-speaking world.

=== Active and passive suffrage for women ===
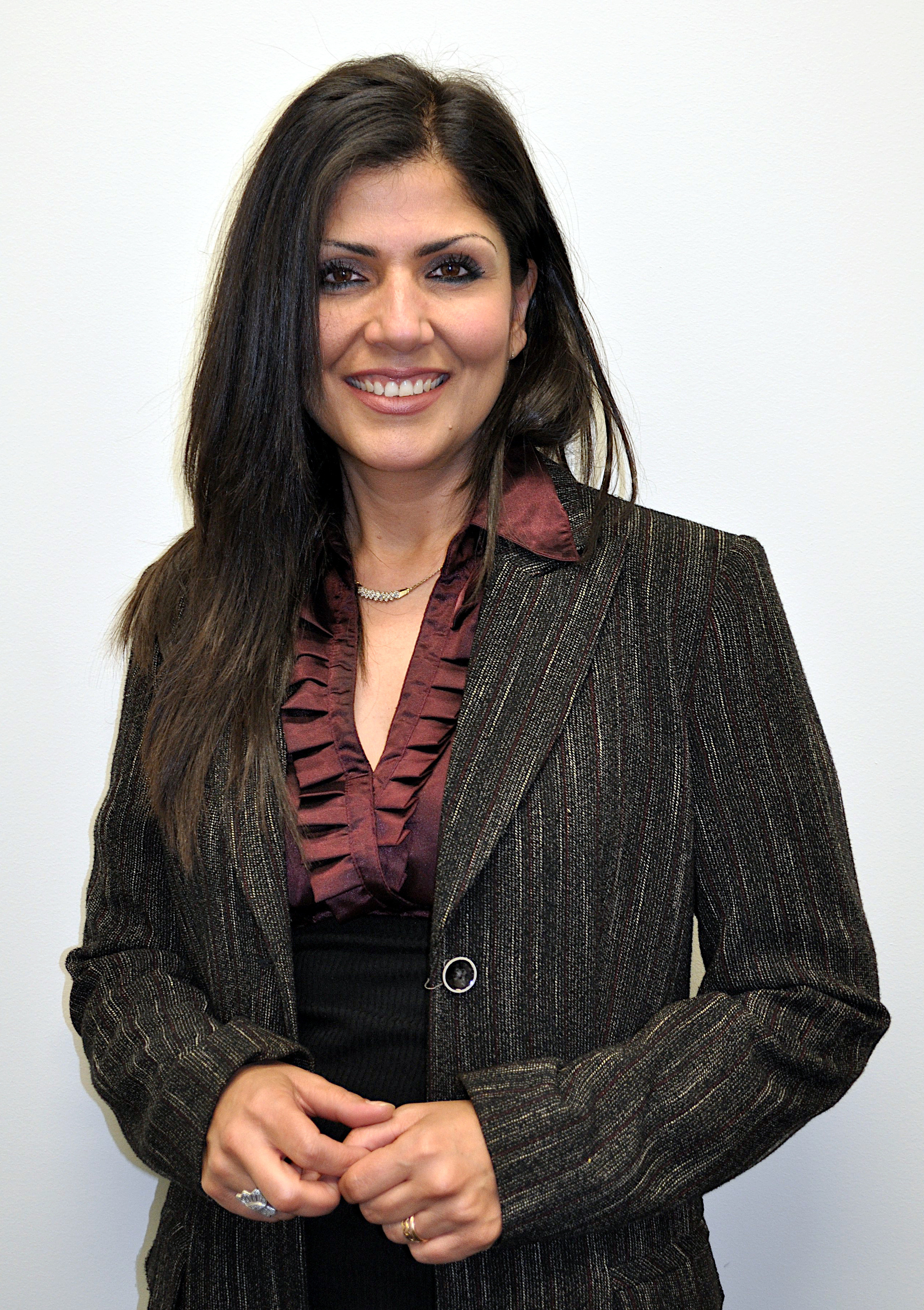
Samah Sabawi is a Palestinian dramatist, writer and journalist.

Women were granted the right to vote on a universal and equal basis in Lebanon in 1952, Syria (to vote) in 1949(Restrictions or conditions lifted) in 1953, Egypt in 1956, Tunisia in 1959, Mauritania in 1961, Algeria in 1962, Morocco in 1963, Libya also in 1963, and Sudan in 1964, Yemen in 1967 (full right) in 1970, Bahrain in 1973, Jordan in 1974, Iraq (full right) 1980, Kuwait in 1985 (later removed and re-granted in 2005),Oman in 1994, and Saudi Arabia in 2015.

=== Economic role ===
According to a report from UNESCO, 34-57% of STEM grads in Arab countries are women, As of 2022, the average female labor force participation rate in Arab States was approximately 19%, with significant variation between countries: 60% in Qatar, 25% in the United Arab Emirates, and just 11% in Iraq Despite improvements in women's education, their employment outcomes remain limited across much of the region.

Recent studies have shown that economic structures, such as a lack of formal job opportunities, weak private sectors, and poor maternity and childcare policies, are more influential in restricting women's participation than cultural or religious norms.

For instance, in countries like Jordan and Tunisia, women are highly educated yet continue to face high unemployment due to inflexible labor markets and gendered economic policies. which is much higher than in the universities of the US or Europe.

A growing number of firms owned by females started to hire women in executive positions. In fact, in Jordan, Palestine, Saudi Arabia and Egypt, firms run by women are growing their workforces at higher rates than those run by men.

In some of the wealthier Arab countries such as UAE, the number of women business owners is growing rapidly and adding to the economic development of the country. Many of these women work with family businesses and are encouraged to study and work. Arab women are estimated to have $40 billion of personal wealth at their disposal, with Qatari families being among the richest in the world.

However, 13 of the 15 countries with the lowest rates of women participating in their labor force are in the Middle East and North Africa. Yemen has the lowest rate of working women of all, followed by Syria, Jordan, Iran, Morocco, Saudi Arabia, Algeria, Lebanon, Egypt, Oman, Tunisia, Mauritania, and Turkey. Unemployment among women in the Middle East is twice that of men, pointing to low wages, a lack of skills and a belief among some that a woman's place is in the home.

Gender inequality remains a major concern in the region, which has the lowest female economic participation in the world (27% of females in the region participate in the workforce, compared to a global average of 56%).

In Saudi Arabia, women do better than men in science and math. In Iran, research shows that girls have “caught up with boys, reversing their score gap, between 1999 and 2007, in both math and science.” And Jordan has always been a top performer in education, with girls outperforming boys there for decades but women still do not get jobs.

There are three reasons that hold women back from the labor force. First, the socio-economic environment discourages women from working despite encouraging them to get an education, especially in oil-rich Gulf nations. Oil and oil-related revenues perpetuate patriarchal family structures because the state itself is the “patriarch” of its citizens, employing them and providing them with ready income. This means that citizens do not have to look for ways to make money outside of state patronage, and may just reinforce already existing conservative gender roles where women stay at home. Oil and oil-related revenues also structure the economy away from female-intensive sectors. Secondly, patriarchal state institution systems often means weak, dependent private sectors that do not want to or can not afford to assume the cost of women's reproductive roles. This seriously hinders women's practical and logistical participation in the labor force. Thirdly, the inhospitable business environment in the private sector discourages women to work. No Arab country has a legal quota for the percentage of women it must include on corporate boards. Only Morocco and Djibouti have laws against gender discrimination in hiring and for equal remuneration for equal work. Algeria has also ruled in favor of equal pay for equal work.

Dr. Nadia Yousaf, an Egyptian sociologist, stated in an article on labor-force participation by women of Middle Eastern and Latin American Countries that the "Middle East reports systematically the lowest female activity rates on record" for labor. However, this data often ignores informal and agricultural work traditionally carried out by women. Thereby underestimating their real economic role. Therefore, historical and modern records suggest that women's labor has been active but largely invisible in official narratives.

Women could contribute to the country's economy since women's employment can significantly improve household income—by as much as 25 percent—and lead many families out of poverty. It continues that increased household income will not only positively impact MENA economies on the micro-level, but it will bolster economies on the macro level as well.

=== Education ===
Access to education for women in Arab countries has significantly increased in recent decades. Research suggests that economic development, more than culture or religion, is the strongest predictor of educational attainment for women in these regions. Women in oil-rich Gulf countries have made some of the biggest educational leaps in recent decades. Compared to women in oil-rich Saudi Arabia, young Muslim women in Mali have shown significantly fewer years of schooling.

In Arab countries, the first modern schools were opened in Egypt (1829), Lebanon (1835) and Iraq (1898).

Female education rapidly increased after emancipation from foreign domination around 1977. Before that, the illiteracy rate remained high among Arab women. The gap between female and male enrollment varies across the Arab world. Countries like Bahrain, Jordan, Kuwait, Libya, Lebanon, Qatar, and the United Arab Emirates achieved almost equal enrollment rates between girls and boys. Female enrollment was as low as 10% in North of Yemen back in 1975. In Unesco's 2012 annual report, it predicted that Yemen will not achieve gender equality in education before 2025. In Qatar, the first school was built in 1956 after a fatwa that states that the Qur'an did not forbid female education.

Over the time period of 1960–1975, the female enrollment ratio in elementary schools grew from 27.9 to 46, 10 to 24.2 for secondary schools.

In terms of college education, in Tunisia, the enrollment jumped from 1,020 people in 1965 to 6,070 in 1977. In Iraq, from 7,625 in 1965 to 28,267 in 1975, in Lebanon from 3,685 in 1965 to I 1,000 in 1971, in Algeria from 1,642 in 1965 to 12,171 in 1975, and in Morocco from 1,089 in 1965 to 8,440 in 1975.

Education attainment has risen drastically among many Arab countries but in this case strictly speaking about Egypt. The type of quality of the education attained is a different issue as there is still a gap in connecting the curriculum and career specific skills. Not just that but the access to higher quality education can be limited by social class and wealth. The quality of the education is determined by the kind of foreign languages available, the depth of the topics studied and the credentials of the teachers and professor. That results in large gaps between social classes and gender equality regarding education attainment.

=== Travel ===
Travel restrictions for women vary significantly across Arab countries. As of 2019, Saudi Arabia removed the requirement for women to obtain permission from a male guardian to travel abroad. In contrast, in countries like Yemen, women still need male approval for passports or travel with children. Despite reforms, safety concerns and societal norms continue to affect women's mobility in some regions.

Women have the right to drive in all Arab countries with Saudi Arabia lifting the ban on June 24, 2018. In Jordan, travel restrictions on women were lifted in 2003. "Jordanian law provides citizens the right to travel freely within the country and abroad except in designated military areas. Unlike Jordan's previous law (No. 2 of 1969), the current Provisional Passport Law (No. 5 of 2003) does not require women to seek permission from their male guardians or husbands in order to renew or obtain a passport." In Yemen, women must obtain approval from a husband or father to get an exit visa to leave the country, and a woman may not take her children with her without their father's permission, regardless of whether or not the father has custody. The ability of women to travel or move freely within Saudi Arabia is severely restricted. However, in 2008 a law went into effect requiring men who marry non-Saudi women to allow their wife and any children born to her to travel freely in and out of Saudi Arabia.

In the past, women in Islamic culture were strictly forbidden to travel around without a male chaperone. Today, to some degree, it is permissible, and there is no objection to a woman traveling alone by the various safe routes and means of travel via their venues such as airports, harbors, and safe transportations. As long as a woman's safety is ensured during her trip, the prohibition is lifted.

=== Traditional dress ===
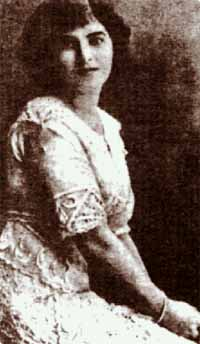
May Ziadeh, a key figure of the Al-Nahda in Arab literary scene, and is known for being an "early feminist" and a "pioneer of Oriental feminism."

Adherence to traditional dress varies across Arab societies. Saudi Arabia is more traditional, while countries like Egypt, and Lebanon are less so. Women are required by law to wear abayas in only Saudi Arabia; this is enforced by the religious police. Some allege that this restricts their economic participation and other activities. In most countries, like Bahrain, Kuwait, Lebanon, Libya, Oman, Jordan, Syria and Egypt, the veil is not mandatory. The veil, hijab in Arabic, means anything that hides.

In Tunisia, the secular government has banned the use of the veil in its opposition to religious extremism. Former President Zine El Abidine Ben Ali called the veil sectarian and foreign and has stressed the importance of traditional Tunisian dress as a symbol of national identity. Islamic feminism counters both sorts of externally imposed dress codes.

Religious views differ on what is considered the proper hijab. This explains the variation in Islamic attire according to geographic location.

In many Arab countries, adherence to traditional dress varies depending on local customs, levels of conservatism, and generational differences. While some women view the hijab and abaya as expressions of faith or identity, others see them as restrictive. Debates over women's clothing often reflect broader conversations about personal freedom, religious expression, and women's rights. These differing views are shaped by cultural, political, and generational factors and are not uniform across the region. Mahmood, Saba. Politics of Piety: The Islamic Revival and the Feminist Subject. Princeton University Press, 2005. However, secular older women are uncomfortable with this spread, viewing it as a symbolic retreat from earlier approaches. Some secular feminists denigrate women who choose to embrace the conservative Islamic dress, yet this attitude is similar to orientalist representations and internalized "clichéd views" of Muslim women. This attitude of denying others freedom of choice demonstrates lack of tolerance for women's complex needs and religious, ideological and generational choices.

=== Conflation of Muslim and Arab identity ===
"Arab" and "Muslim" are often used interchangeably. The conflation of these two identities ignores the diverse religious beliefs of Arab people and also overlooks Muslims who are not Arabs. It, "also erases the historic and vast ethnic communities who are neither Arab nor Muslim but who live amid and interact with a majority of Arabs or Muslims." This generalization, "enables the construction of Arabs and Muslims as backward, barbaric, misogynist, sexually savage, and sexually repressive." This type of stereotyping leads to the orientalizing of Arab women and depicts them as fragile, sexually oppressed individuals who cannot stand up for their beliefs. It is also significant that countless female figures overcame oppression and proved dominant in their field, including Zaha Hadid, Hayat Sindi and Lubna Olayan.

=== Arab women's rights and legal restrictions ===
Tunisia is the only Arabic-speaking Muslim-majority country to grant women equal rights as men, outlawing polygamy, allowing Muslim women to marry non-Muslim men, and giving them equal inheritance as men.

Egypt is one of the leading countries with active feminist movements, and the fight for women's rights is associated to social justice and secular nationalism. Egyptian feminism started out with informal networks of activism after women were not granted the same rights as their male comrades in 1922. The movements eventually resulted in women gaining the right to vote in 1956.

Although Lebanese laws do not give Lebanese women full rights, Lebanon has a very large feminism movement. NGOs like Kafa and Abaad have served this feminist obligation, and tried several times to pass adequate laws that give Lebanese women their rights. The most talked about right is citizenship by marriage and descent: a woman in Lebanon is not authorised to pass her citizenship to her spouse nor her children. This right is making a buzz in Lebanese society, but is not widely approved.

Feminists in Saudi Arabia can end up in jail or face a death penalty for their activism. Some of their requests were granted such as not requiring a male guardian to access government services. Women still need a male guardian's approval to travel and marry.

In Libya, a rather conservative Arab country, Khadija Bsekri, a professor, founded in 2011 an organisation, The Female Amazons of Libya. The organisation launched some campaigns, such as those to curtail against violence against women, improve the status of migrant shelters, and strengthen the capacities of activists and media professionals. Its name reflects mythical prehistoric Libyan Amazons.

The Arab world distinguishes for the preeminence of religious-derived laws, particularly in family law. Although Islamic laws grants women property rights, they inherit less than men. Muslim family law reinforces the distinction between the public and private sphere of the family, particularly through male guardianship over spouses.

To continue female empowerment in the Arabic-speaking world, young Arab women need role models. A lot of the times, these role models can be found through social media. Hayla Ghazal is a Syrian-Emirati vlogger who uses sketch-style comedic content to explore these topics.

Some atheist, women's rights supporters, such as Egyptian activist Sherif Gaber, argue that most of the hostile attitudes towards women in Muslim male culture such as over-sexual/pure-virgin view of women, and hostile actions such as marriage to preteen girls, physical assault by male relatives, marital rape, infidelity by polygamy, sexual harassment or assault, and forced obedience to a Wali are due to Islam as a religion literally in accordance with its male-dominant spirit. This is apparent in Muslim majority countries. He compares in the west that women are more protected against violence, including sexual violence than in the Arab countries. This view is not popular in the Arab world as Muslims believe in Islamic sharia law as the non-negotiable word of their God, regardless of the moral dilemma of the Islamic religion and physical or psychological impact on women and children.

== 'Honour'-Based Violence and Femicide ==
Despite legislative progress regionally and internationally, 'honour' killings remain a persistent challenge within domestic spheres of several countries, such as Jordan.

The persistence of these crimes exposes a significant gap between international legal commitments, such as the Arab Charter on Human Rights and the Convention on the Elimination of All Forms of Discrimination Against Women (CEDAW), and local socio-cultural practices as well as national jurisprudence. Scholars such as Fadia Faqir, Carol Kaplanian, and Aisha Gill provide a sociological analysis of the reasons for 'honour' killings enduring even to this day.

Countries like Jordan still preserve national legislation such as articles 340 and 98 of the Jordanian penal code. The existence of these articles allows for the continuation of 'honour' as a legal lenience in cases of femicide. This can be seen in Hadidi et. Al's case study of 16 'honour' killings from 1995. Additionally, honour killings are an issue has implications for victims to this day, seen in the experiences of Nina Aouilk.

== Prominent Arab women ==
In 2018, Arabian Business ranked the "50 Most Influential Women in the Arab World" as:

- Jeehan Abdul Qadir
- Isobel Abulhoul
- Ghosson Al Khaled
- Najla al Ghanim
- Faten Al-Naqeeb
- Muna Al Hashemi
- Shaikha Noora Bint Khalifa Al Khalifa
- Ebtesam Al Ketbi
- Najla al Midfa
- Nour al Hassan

Forbes Middle East published a "Most Influential Women 2018" list, naming the top 10 Arabian women of societal influence as:

- Lubna al-Olayan
- Raja Easa al-Gurg
- Renuka Jagtiani
- Rania Nashar
- Khawla al-Asadi
- Eaman al-Roudhan
- Shaikha al-Bahar
- Mona al-Moayyed
- Huda Khattan
- Amal Bahwan

=== Lama Al-Sulaiman ===
Lama Al-Sulaiman was one of the first two Saudi women elected office as a board member of the Jeddah Chamber of Commerce (JCC), a prominent center for businesswomen in Saudi Arabia, and is now president of its Khadijah bint Khuwalid Center for Businesswomen. The World Economic Forum recognized her as a Young Arab Leader, and she has been the director of Rolaco Trading and Contracting, the National Institute of Health Services, the National Home Health Care Foundation, and the Economic and Social Circle of the Mecca Region. Al-Sulaiman earned a BSc in biochemistry from King Abdulaziz University in Saudi Arabia, and holds an M.Sc. in health and nutrition and a PhD in biochemical nutrition from King's College at the University of London. Just a week before standing at the JCC election, Dr. Al-Sulaiman won a deadly struggle against breast cancer. At the Sixth Cancer Cure Conference she shared her remarkable story of recovery publicly for the first time. She realized that the best treatment was closeness to God. She followed the appropriate nutritional plan and used alternative medicine to improve physically.

=== Christine Sfeir ===
Christine Sfeir was only 22 years old when she moved to Beirut from Montreal, Canada, and opened the first Dunkin' Donuts in Lebanon. Christine is ranked as one of the top 100 Arab Women, and she is also the CEO of Lebanese food chains Semsom and Green Falafel. Since 1997, she has opened more than 30 DD restaurants in the country. She has furthermore expanded her talent in restaurant chains, and on top of being the CEO of the Dunkin' Donuts chain in Lebanon, she is bringing Lebanese cuisine to the United States with the restaurant chain Semsom, and has future plans of opening up in India⁣.

=== Mona Almoayyed ===
Mona Yousuf Almoayyed is a businesswoman, philanthropist, environmentalist and women's rights activist who is the managing director of one of Bahrain's oldest conglomerates, Y. K. Almoayyed & Sons.

Possessing a bachelor's degree in business administration, Alomayyed oversees the business endeavours of Y. K. Almoayyed & Sons.

Voted the third most influential Arab Women's List in the MENA region by Forbes Middle East in 2013, and in 2018, Mona is a member of the board of directors for BMMI and Ebda Bank besides other companies. She is well known for her charity work and frequently speaks about the role of women in building a better society today. Mona has been a firm believer of 'Business with a Conscience' principle and is involved in many charitable institutions. Besides her Business and Social Activity, Mona strives to draw a perfect balance between being a mother, housewife and mentor role she plays.

Having been brought up in a conservative environment in the 70s Middle East, the young girl's childhood was simple and disciplined like any middle class Arab girl's upbringing.

=== Mona Bawarshi ===
Mona Bawarshi is CEO of Gezairi Transport, which is based out of Syria with branches in Turkey, Jordan, Iraq, and Cyprus. She is also a founding member of the Abdul Salam Bou Azza El-Gezairi Charity Foundation and a member of the board of trustees of Makassed Philanthropic Islamic Association of Beirut.She is also a member of the Lebanese Vessels Owners Committee and the International Federation of Freight Forwarders Association.

=== Donna Sultan ===
For 36 years, Donna Sultan has played a significant role in positioning KEO International Consultants within the market. During the past 28 years, she has served as the president and chief executive officer of the planning, design, engineering, and project management specialist. Based out of Kuwait, Sultan led a team of 686 full-time qualified engineers in 2018. Her team currently includes a total of 291 female employees.

Some of the group's training initiatives in 2018 revolved around contract awareness and standard operating procedures. One of KEO International Consultants’ initiatives this year centres on financial commercial management and enterprise resource planning.

=== Ismahane Elouafi ===
Dr. Ismahane Elouafi is the chief scientist of the Food and Agriculture Organization of the United Nations (FAO), since 2020. She joined ICBA as Director General in 2012 and, prior, held management positions with the Canadian Food Inspection Agency and Agriculture and Agri-Food Canada. She also worked as a scientist with several international research organizations, including the International Center for Agricultural Research in the Dry Areas (ICARDA), Japan International Research Center for Agricultural Sciences (JIRCAS), and International Maize and Wheat Center (CIMMYT).

She is a recipient of many international awards, including the Excellence in Science award from the Global Thinkers Forum (2014), and the National Reward Medal by His Majesty Mohamed VI, the King of Morocco (2014). In 2014, Muslim Science ranked Dr. Elouafi among the 20 Most Influential Women in Science in the Islamic World under the Shapers category, and the CEO-Middle East Magazine listed her among the World's 100 Most Powerful Arab Women in the Science category.

=== Buthaina Al Ansari ===
Buthaina Al Ansari, founder and Chairperson of Qatariat T&D Holding Company and Senior Human Resources Director at Ooredoo, delivered a CIRS Monthly Dialogue on the topic of “Sheroes—How Female Leaders are Changing Qatar” on November 17, 2014.

Al Ansari is a member of the MENA Business Women's Networks, an ambassador for Women Leading Change Qatar, a board member of Qatar Business Women's Association, and a Mentor at the Qatar Professional Women's Network Circle.

=== Sayyida al Hurra ===
Sayyida al Hurra also known as "the free queen"or "pirate queen," held the remarkable titles of privateer and governor of Tetouan from 1515 until 1542. Born as Aicha bint Ali ibn Rashid al-Alami, she was a descendant of the Islamic prophet Muhammad and her father was the founder of the city Chefchaouen. Known for her family connections and exceptional qualities, Aicha played a significant role in ruling Tetouan.

In 1505, Aicha married the governor of Tetouan, aligning herself as a valuable partner due to her family background and personal attributes. Initially, she ruled Tetouan alongside her husband, but after his death, Aicha ruled independently. Sayyida al Hurra gained her title, which means "Lady Sovereign" or "Free Woman", through her marriage to Abu Hassan al-Mandari, the ruler of Tetouan. Her uncle had gained recognition for seizing Tetouan from the Portuguese, and brother held a high rank at the court in Fes. Furthermore, her father had governed Chefchaouen for many years. During her reign, Tetouan became the only functioning port outside of Portuguese control.

Aicha's rule was marked by her ongoing conflict with the Portuguese king John III of Portugal, Stemming from the aftermath of the Reconquista. Recognizing the need for assistance, she sought support from Suleiman the Magnificent. The Ottoman ruler. Through the cooperation of Hayreddin Barbarossa and his fleet, Aicha successfully defended Tetouan against Portuguese attacks, securing her control. However, this cooperation with the Ottomans was short-lived, and the Portuguese split their commercial ties with Tetouan, posing a significant challenge. Aicha needed to strengthen her position.

In 1541 she married the ruler of Fes Abu al-Abbas Ahmad ibn Muhammad. Notably, their wedding took place in Tetouan, deviating from the traditional practice of the bride going to the groom's locations. This event showcased Aicha's influence and power, as the Sultan himself traveled to Tetouan to marry her. After the wedding, the Sultan returned to Fes, and the couple lived separately.

Tragically, Aicha's marriage to Abu al-Abbas Ahmad ibn Muhammad did not endure. She was betrayed by her son-in-law, who aligned himself with a new dynasty. Consequently, in 1542, Aicha was dethroned and exiled to Chefchaouen, where she spent the remainder of her life. The exact details of her later life and her eventual fate remain unclear.

Sayyida Al Hurra's reign as the pirate queen of Tetouan left an indelible mark on Moroccan history. Her resilience in the face of Portuguese aggression, her diplomatic endeavors with the Ottomans, and her role in establishing Tetouan as a thriving port accentuate her strength as a ruler. Despite her eventual downfall and exile, Aicha's legacy endures as a symbol of female empowerment and leadership. She ruled with distinction during the early 16th century. Though her reign eventually came to an end, her legacy as a remarkable female leader endures, inspiring generations to come.

== See also ==
- Arab culture
- Democracy in the Middle East
- Human rights in the Middle East
- Human trafficking in the Middle East
- LGBT in the Middle East
- Sexual taboo in the Middle East
- Women in Islam
- Al-Khansa
- Al-Khayzuran
- Arab Christians
- Arab Jews
- Campaign Against Lebanese Rape Law - Article 522
- Egyptian Feminist Union
- Female genital cutting
- Gender apartheid
- Negev Bedouin women
- Rania al-Baz
- Saddeka Arebi
- Sahrawi women
- Shajarat al-Durr
- Women and Memory Forum
- Women in Muslim societies
- Women's political rights in Bahrain
- Women in Asia
- Duma (2011 film)
- Women's rights in Saudi Arabia
- Sayyida al Hurra
- Arwa al-Sulayhi
- Aisha
- Zaha Hadid
