= Muna =

Muna may refer to:

== Arts and entertainment ==
- Muna (band), an American pop band
- Muna (Markéta Irglová album)
- Muna (Muna album)
- Muna (2019 film), a Nigerian film by Kevin Nwankwor
- Muna (2023 film), a British short film

== Biology ==
- Muña (Minthostachys mollis), a medicinal plant from the South American Andes
- Muna (moth), a moth genus in the family Depressariidae
- Muna, a common name for the wood type Anigre

== Places ==
- Muna (Mikulovice), a World War II POW camp and ammunition factory in the Czech Republic
- Muna, Estonia, village in Rõuge Parish, Võru County, Estonia
- Muna, Iran, village in East Azerbaijan Province, Iran
- Muna, Nepal, village development committee, Myagdi District, Nepal
- Muna, Saudi Arabia, neighborhood of Mecca in Makkah Province, Saudi Arabia
- Muna, Yucatán, town in Yucatán, Mexico
- Muna (Umba), river in Murmansk Oblast, Russia, tributary of the Umba
- Muna (Lena) river in Yakutia, Russia, tributary of the Lena
- Muna Island, an island in South East Sulawesi, Indonesia
  - Muna Regency, a regency in South East Sulawesi, Indonesia; covers part of the island of Muna and part of neighbouring Buton Island
  - West Muna Regency, a separate regency in South East Sulawesi, Indonesia; cut out of Muna Regency in 2014

== People ==
- Muna people, Indonesia
- Muna (name), a given name

== Other ==
- Muna–Buton languages, a group of languages spoken on the islands of Muna and Buton off the coast of South East Sulawesi province, Indonesia
  - Muna language, an Austronesian language spoken principally on the island of Muna and the adjacent (northwestern) part of Buton Island
- Muna Hotel, a hotel in Mogadishu, Somalia, located less than a mile from Somalia's presidential palace, as a noted conference centre
  - Muna Hotel attack, attacked by al-Shabaab fighters on 24 August 2010
- Finnish profanity § muna

== See also ==
- Muna Lee (disambiguation)
