= Randa Bessiso =

Lebanese academic

Randa Bessiso is the founding director of the Middle East Centre at Manchester University. She is a Lebanese national of Palestinian origin.

Bessiso began working in business education as the Vice President for Training & Consultancy at PROJACS International. She then worked with the UK eUniversities initiative. In 2006, she founded Manchester University's Middle East Centre in Dubai, which she currently administers as the Director. The centre is part of a two-year Manchester Global part-time MBA programme, which as of 2019 had taught more than 2,500 students. This centre is the largest and the fastest-growing of the six centres in the Manchester Global MBA programme, representing more than half the students in the program worldwide. In 2019, Manchester University was named Best MBA Program by the Forbes Middle East Higher Education Awards. Bessiso is also the Chair of the UAE-UK Business Council's Higher Education Group.

Bessiso has been recognized as one of Forbes Middle East's 100 Most Powerful Arab Women every year from 2014 to 2018. In 2019, she was named one of the 30 Most Influential Women in the Arab World by Arabian Business, and received Entrepreneur Middle East's 2019 Achieving Women award in Education.
