= Wassef El Harakeh =

Lebanese lawyer and political activist

Wassef Habib El Harake (or Wassef Harake, Arabic واصف حبيب الحركة) is a Lebanese lawyer, political activist and a candidate for the Shiite seat in the third Mount Lebanon district for the Baadba for Change list. He is one of the Lebanese Revolution's most prominent faces, capable of mobilizing hundreds of people by his mere presence. He presents himself as a political alternative to the ruling class, thus he was physically attacked on multiple occasions, by his opponents and authorities' police.

== Biography ==
He was born on 4/12/1971, holding a law degree from Beirut Arab University.

He started his political activism since the 1990s.

He became one of the most dominant faces since the start of the 17 October 2019 Revolution in Lebanon.

On December 6, 2019, he filed a complaint, with a group of lawyers, to the Public Prosecutor Ghassan Oweidat, against all public servants (ministers, public employees, mayors, contractors, etc.) whose negligence and violation of laws cause the floods all over Lebanon on December 4–5, 2019.

In 2020, politicians Wael Abu Faour sued Wassef El Harakeh, after he latter accused Abou Faour of smuggling cancer medicine to As-Suwayda, Syria during his tenure as Minister of Public Health, which caused shortage in the medicaments for the Lebanese citizens.

== Activities ==
- He is a member of the Popular Observatory for Fighting Corruption (المرصد الشعبي لمحاربة الفساد)
- He is one of the founders of the We Want Accountability (بدنا نحاسب ) campaign

He has coordination relationships with many associations concerned with politics and social activity, such as:

- Sabaa Party حزب سبعة
- You Stink Movement طلعت ريحتكم
- Citizens of a State مواطنون ومواطنات في دولة
- The Upper Matn Movement حراك المتن الأعلى
- The Gathering of Sons of Baalbek تجمع أبناء بعلبك
- The Meeting of the Civil State لقاء الدولة المدنية
- Right صح
- My Right حقّي
- United متحدون,
- To My Country لبلدي
- The Encounter of Identity and Sovereignty لقاء الهوية والسيادة

== See also ==
- Lokman Slim
- Mona Fayad
- Paula Yacoubian
