= Mona Demaidi =

Palestinian entrepreneur and women's rights advocate

- منى نبيل ضميدي
- Born: Mona Nabil Mohamed Demaidi منى نبيل محمد ضميدي; December 14, 1988 (age 37); Nablus, West Bank
- Education: An-Najah National University; University of Manchester
- Occupations: Vice President of Artificial Intelligence and Director of International Relations at Arab American University
- Website: https://monademaidi.live/

Mona Nabil Demaidi (Arabic: منى نبيل ضميدي) is an entrepreneur and women's rights advocate. She was born on December 14, 1988, in Nablus, Palestine. She obtained her PhD in Advanced Software Engineering and Machine Learning and MSc with distinction in Software Engineering and Data Management from the University of Manchester, UK. Demaidi joined An-Najah National University in 2016, becoming the youngest female with a PhD certificate at the Faculty of Engineering and Information Technology in Palestine. In 2014, she became a board member of Women in Engineering and Arab Women in Computing. In september 2024, Dr Demaidi became the dean for the Faculty of Digital Sciences and Director of International Relations at Arab American University between September 1, 2024 – August 1, 2025. Starting from August 2025 she became the vice president of Artificial Intelligence and Director of International Relations at Arab American University.

== Biography ==
In 1993, Demaidi moved with her family to Dundee, UK, and went to primary school at Hawkhill School and Park Place School. She finished high school in Palestine. Mona Demaidi gained her Bachelor of Science (BSc) degree in Computer Engineering at An-Najah National University located in Nablus, Palestine. After getting her Master of Science degree in Advanced Software Engineering and Data Management in 2010/11 at the University of Manchester, she obtained her PhD in Artificial Intelligence.

== Experience ==
Mona Demaidi is the founder of STEMpire which is powered by PALMEC International. STEMpire empower future innovators through STEM education, bootcamps, and hackathons. In addition, Dr Mona is the chairwoman and advisory board member of Intersect Innovation Hub which is powered by Bank of Palestine. Also, Demaidi plays an important role in the IEEE Palestine Subsection as chairwoman, Student Branch Counselor and a previous judge at the end of 2019. In addition to that, she was or currently is a judge in several foundations including the Hult Prize Foundation, flow accelerator and Code Your Future. Mona is also a co-founder for VTech Road and a Co-managing director for Girls in Tech, Inc. Demaidi is the Chairwoman of the Institute of Electrical and Electronics Engineers in Palestine and was the first woman to be granted an award from the Institute of Electrical and Electronics Engineers (senior membership). She also became the co-managing director for Girls in Tech in Palestine. Demaidi is also a researcher as she has issued six journal papers and a book Terminological Ontology Evaluator in eLearning on constructing online learning platforms using machine learning. Mona Demaidi developed the National Artificial Intelligence Strategy for Palestine in 2022.

== Recognition ==
Dr. Mona Nabil Demaidi has been recognized for her leadership in artificial intelligence, ethics, and women's empowerment, both in Palestine and globally.

She is the lead author of the Palestinian Artificial Intelligence National Strategy, officially approved by the Cabinet of Ministers in June 2023, and the author of UNESCO's AI and Ethics Policy Report for Palestine. She is currently leading the AI in Higher Education Policy for Palestine (2025–2027), a groundbreaking initiative that integrates responsible and inclusive AI adoption across universities and academic institutions, shaping the future of AI-driven education in the country.

For her pioneering impact, Dr. Demaidi was named among the 100 Women of Davos (2025) and the 100 Brilliant Women in AI & Ethics (2025) for her global contributions to ethical and inclusive AI. In 2024, she was selected as a member of UNESCO's Women for Ethical AI and joined Izdihar: The Regional Alliance of Women Experts, a CIPE-supported network uniting over 40 distinguished women leaders from across the Middle East and North Africa.

In 2023, she was honored as the Most Influential Woman in Palestine by the Ministry of Women’s Affairs and Qarib Association, and received the Best IEEE Entrepreneurial Activity Award for the Middle East, Europe, and Africa region. In 2022, the Asfari Institute for Civil Society and Citizenship and UNESCO recognized her among the five most inspiring women in the MENA region.

Dr. Demaidi made history as the first woman in technology from Palestine to be featured on Wikipedia and the first Palestinian woman to achieve IEEE Senior Member status (2020). That same year, she received the Most Impactful Idea Award from Stanford University’s Idea-to-Market Global Innovation Catalyst Program for her startup Guardian-A, reflecting her ability to merge AI innovation with social impact.

Her research and innovation excellence have been celebrated through multiple honors, including the Zuhair Hijjawi Research Award (2017) and the Audience Award at the NYU Abu Dhabi International Hackathon for Social Good (2015). She has also secured numerous research grants and excellence awards for advancing AI in education, sustainability, and gender equality across developing contexts.

== See also ==
- Sanaa Alsarghali
- Rula Hassanein
