= Monna (name) =

Monna is both a rare feminine given name and a surname of different origins. Notable people with the name include:

== Given name ==
- Monna Tandberg (1939–2025), Norwegian actress

== Pseudonym ==
- Monna Bell (real name Ana Nora Escobar; 1938–2008), Chilean singer
- Monna Lissa, pseudonym of María Luisa Fernández (1870–1938), Chilean feminist writer, editor, and poet

== Surname ==
- Antonie Frans Monna (1909–1995), Dutch mathematician and historian of mathematics
- Naoki Monna (born 1942), Japanese sociologist
- Paolo Monna (born 1998), Italian pistol shooter
- Tetsuhiro Monna (born 1970), Japanese baseball player

== See also ==
- Mona (name), people with this name
- Monna Vanna (disambiguation), a list of numerous works of art
