= Mona Hopton Bell =

British artist

Mona Hopton Bell (1867–1940) was a British artist, best known for her portraits of civic figures.

She was the grandmother of the painter Jean H. Bell.
