= Ebtesam Al-Ketbi =

Professor of political science

Dr. Ebtesam Al-Ketbi
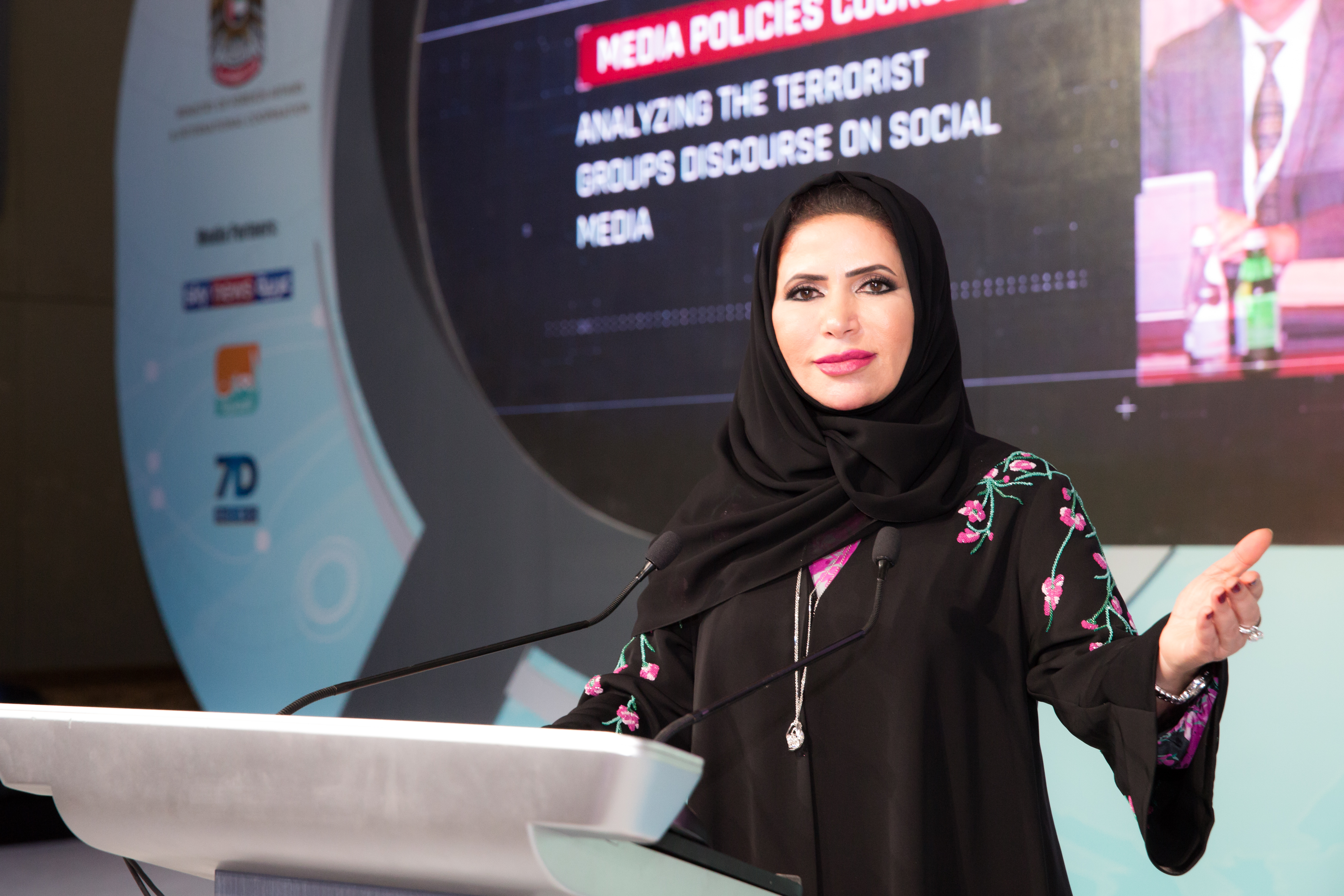
- Born: 1960 (age 65–66); Dammam, Saudi Arabia
- Education: Cairo University
- Occupations: Political scientist, Policy expert, Professor

Dr. Ebtesam Al-Ketbi (Arabic: ابتسام الكتبي) is a political scientist who founded and presides over The Emirates Policy Center think tank.

== Professional career and achievements ==
Dr. Al-Ketbi has worked for two decades in the analysis and strategic recommendations on regional and global affairs. Her most notable achievement is her role as the founder and president of The Emirates Policy Center (EPC), she is the first Arab woman to lead a think tank

EPC is a highly regarded think tank located in Abu Dhabi, United Arab Emirates. Founded in 2013, EPC provides strategic analysis and policy recommendations on a range of issues impacting the Gulf region and the UAE, and is considered one of the most influential think tanks in the Arab world. Under Dr. Al-Ketbi's leadership, EPC has been consistently ranked as one of the top think tanks in the Middle East and North Africa region according to the Global Think Tank Index Report (TTCP) published by the University of Pennsylvania, and its annual Abu Dhabi Strategic Debate (ADSD) has become a primary platform for global dialogue on regional and international security. ADSD is ranked among the world’s top ten conferences.

In addition to her role at EPC, Dr. Al-Ketbi has held various positions within regional and global organizations, including The Arab Association for Political Science, The board of trustees for the Arab Unity Studies Center and the Arab Organization for Transparency, and The Arab Anti-Corruption Organization. She is also a member of the Board of Directors of the Arab Gulf States Institute in Washington, The Global Advisory Board of the Observer Research Foundation in India, Arabian Peninsula Affairs Advisory Council of the Middle East Institute in Washington, and The International Advisory Board of the Italian Med-Or Foundation.

In 2015, Al-Ketbi was appointed as a member of The Consultative Commission of the Gulf Cooperation Council (GCC), in recognition of her efforts as a leader of the EPC. She served as secretary-general for the Gulf Development Forum. Al-Ketbi is also a founding member of The Emirates Human Rights Association.

== Awards and recognitions ==
Al-Ketbi was listed among The 50 Most Influential Women in the Arab world by Arabian Business magazine in 2018. She has also received The Women Super Achiever Award at the World Women Leadership Congress in Mumbai, India, in 2019, and The Arab Social Media Influencers Award in the Politics category by the Dubai Press Club in 2018. In 2021, she was named Advisor to the Global Commission for Post-Pandemic Policy for her distinguished research on the comprehensive consequences of the Covid-19 pandemic on the world and the Middle East, and in 2023, she was named an Advisory Board Member of T20 International.

Dr. Al-Ketbi is a frequent speaker, participant, and guest at international conferences such as Munich Security Conference in Germany, Manama Dialogue in Bahrain, ISPI - Italian Institute for International Political Studies, Valdai Discussion Club in Moscow, Raisina Dialogue by Observer Research Foundation New Delhi in India, GLOBSEC Bratislava Forum in Bratislava, and Delphi Economic Forum in Greece Dr. Al-Ketbi is a regular commentator on regional and international television networks and is regarded as one of the experts in the field of international politics and policy.

== Education and academic career ==
Dr. Ebtesam Al-Ketbi holds a Ph.D. in political science from Cairo University. with a thesis entitled "The Political Implications of the Rentier State in the Gulf". She has authored academic works on topics such as Gulf security, US-GCC relations, The Peace process in the Middle East, and the War on Terrorism. Some examples of her published papers and articles include:

- Contemporary Shifts in UAE Foreign Policy: From the Liberation of Kuwait to the Abraham Accords
- Biden in the Middle East: Opportunities and Challenges
- The Global Community and the War on Terrorism: Threat or Opportunity?
- Democratic Transformations in GCC Countries
- Pitching Abraham's Tent: The Human Dimension of UAE-Israeli Normalization
- Building an Arab-Israel Bloc: Can It Compensate for a Reluctant Washington?
- Emirati-Israeli Peace Agreement: Could it be a Game-Changer?"
- The UAE-Israel Breakthrough: Bilateral and Regional Implications and U.S. Policy
- The Security Dimensions of Military Relations Between GCC countries and the USA
- Will Israel's Actions in Gaza Affect the Abraham Accords
- The Gulf's voice must be heard in Iran negotiations.

== Publications ==
In addition to her research papers, Dr. Al-Ketbi has recently published three books, including:

- The UAE Power Building Model: Mohamed bin Zayed's Vision (2022).
- The UAE Power-Building Model and Foreign Policy Shifts (2021).
- Iran and the Biden Administration: A Potential Return to Negotiations(2021).
