= Sanaa al-Sarghali =

Palestinian legal and political researcher

- سناء السرغلي
- Born: Sanaa Samir Hussein Abdullah al-Sarghali سناء سمير حسين عبد الله السرغلي; 2 February 1987 (age 39); Tulkarm, West Bank
- Education: An-Najah National University; Durham University; Lancaster University
- Occupation: University lecturer

Sanaa al-Sarghali (born 2 February 1987) is a Palestinian legal and political researcher. She is the first woman from the State of Palestine to hold a PhD in Constitutional Law. She is an assistant professor at An-Najah National University and director of the Center for Constitutional Studies, which she co-founded in 2019. In 2019, she was appointed as the ninth member of the Palestinian Constitution Drafting Committee by the Palestinian National Council (PNC), the legislative arm of the Palestine Liberation Organization (PLO). Then in 2020, she was appointed as the UNESCO Chair on Human Rights, Democracy and Peace.

== Early life and education ==
Sanaa al-Sarghali was born in Tulkarm on 2 February 1987 and finished her secondary education there at Al-Adawiya Girls Secondary School. She is the third child of Sameer al-Sarghali and Raja Hajqasem, both pharmacists from Tulkarm. Her maternal grandmother is a Jewish immigrant from Poland who married her Palestinian grandfather in 1937 in Jerusalem. After their marriage, her grandmother converted to Islam and lived in Tulkarm.

In 2005, al-Sarghali enrolled at the An-Najah National University in Nablus, where she graduated in 2009 with a law degree. She graduated at the top of her class and was awarded the An-Najah Master Scholarship, which allowed her to study in the United Kingdom. Beginning in 2019, she attended Durham University, where she studied international trade and commercial law, graduating in 2010 with an MSc degree. In 2011, she began attending Lancaster University, where she completed her PhD in constitutional law, becoming the first Palestinian woman to do so at the university. While attending, she served as an assistant dean for three years, helping to found a café for PhD students where they could share their work and collaborate with students from different specializations. Two years after graduating, in December 2018, al-Sarghali received the Outstanding Alumni Award, which recognizes Lancaster graduates who have made a substantial contribution in their field and have developed an outstanding national or international reputation amongst their peers.

== Media work ==
Al-Sarghali worked as a presenter for a local TV station in Palestine for eight years, eventually receiving formal training from Internews. Soon after, she joined the organization Women Media and Development (TAM) and began hosting a television show on Palestinian national television. The show focused on changing the stereotypical image of Palestinian women in media. She is also an alumnus of Annenberg-Oxford Media Policy Summer Institute.

== Activism ==
In 2016, al-Sarghali was elected as the chairwoman of TAM, becoming the youngest elected chairwoman for an active NGO in Palestine. In 2019, she took part in a symposium on women's political participation hosted by CARE International. Then in 2020, she gave a lecture before the Parliament of Australia about the drafting of the constitution in Palestine. Throughout her career, she has given addresses at Palestinian universities encouraging young women to take part in the political process.

=== Constitutional awareness campaigns ===
In 2018, al-Sarghali participated in a major conference on constitutional development at the An-Najah National University College of Law. In her opening remarks, she emphasized the importance of addressing women's rights in the constitution. Then in 2019, she participated in a workshop held in Ramallah to discuss constitutional principles.

Al-Sarghali was also one of the founders of the “My Constitution Includes Me” campaign, which aimed to provide support for popular participation in the formation of the Palestinian constitution, advocate for the role of women in the drafting process, and conceptualize methods for constitutional development under Israeli occupation. The campaign was officially launched on October 11, 2020 in collaboration with TAM, the Constitutional Studies Center at An-Najah National University, and the General Union of Palestinian Women (GUPW). As part of the campaign, she directed several videos for various social media platforms, including Facebook, Instagram, Twitter, and Youtube.

In addition to her work with the “My Constitution Includes Me” campaign in 2020, al-Sarghali also participated in a webinar hosted by An-Najah National University, where she discussed the impact of the COVID-19 pandemic on constitutional development in Palestine.

== Academic affiliations ==
Al-Sarghali is a fellow at the Richardson Institute and SEPAD project where her work focusses on sectarianism and Constitutional Identity. She has published on constitutional identities in Bahrain, Lebanon, and Palestine. Her work in Palestine focuses mostly on constitutional design, and in particular the Palestinian semi-presidential system. She has been awarded various fellowships, including the Kathleen Fitzpatrick Visiting Fellowship in Constitutional Law at Melbourne University in July and August 2020.

== Awards ==
- Outstanding Alumni Award, Lancaster University
- Kathleen Fitzpatrick Visiting Fellowship, Melbourne University
