= Mona Cliff =

Native American beadwork artist (born 1977

- Born: 1977 (age 48–49)
- Education: Cornish College of the Arts; Haskell Indian Nations University
- Occupation: Artist
- Style: Beadwork
- Website: monacliff.com

Mona Cliff (born 1977) is a Native American (Aaniiih/Nakota) beadwork artist, muralist, and installation artist based in Lawrence, Kansas. Cliff uses seed beads to create landscapes and sculptural pieces.

Cliff has two pieces in the permanent collection of the Kansas City Museum in Kansas City, Missouri and one in the Mulvane Art Museum at Washburn University in Topeka, Kansas. Her work has been exhibited at the Kemper Museum of Contemporary Art in Kansas City, Missouri.

== Life ==
Cliff grew up in the Pacific Northwest. At age 19, she learned traditional beading from her grandmother, who also gave her the Aaniih name HanukGahNé. She attended Cornish College of the Arts in Seattle, Washington, where she earned a Bachelor of Fine Arts degree in printmaking. She is an enrolled member of the Gros Ventre of Fort Belknap. She is Frozen Clan (Aaniiih) and Medicine Bear Clan (Nakota).

Cliff moved to Kansas in 2004, where she met her husband, who is Osage, while the two were attending Haskell Indian Nations University in Lawrence. They have three children, all of whom are enrolled with the Osage Nation. She was a stay-at-home mother from 2009 until 2018, when she began pursuing art as a career.

In Fall 2022, she was an artist in residence at the Topeka & Shawnee County Public Library in Topeka. As of 2022, she was working as a DEI Indigenous communities representative for the Kansas Creative Arts Industry Commission.

Cliff was one of 19 artists chosen to create pieces for the Kansas City International Airport terminal, which opened in 2023. In 2023, she completed four murals in Kansas. In May 2023, she was one of three artists in the exhibit "Roadside Inappropriation" at Teepee Junction, at U.S. 24 and 40 highways north of Lawrence, Kansas. The exhibit aimed to explore the appropriation of culture by tourist shops and attractions; Cliff's piece was a teepee painted with contemporary designs. In July 2023, one of Cliff's works, "Morning Bird", was acquired for a permanent exhibit at the CPKC Stadium in Kansas City, Missouri.

Cliff was picked for the National Museum of Women in the Arts's exhibit "New Worlds: Women to Watch 2024". Her piece in the exhibit, "Past/Presence/Future" (2020), is a beaded gas mask. Cliff was inspired to make the piece after visiting the Cahokia mounds and discovering a landfill near the site. Her work was also influenced by the COVID-19 pandemic and the ideas of indigenous medicine and knowledge. In October 2024, she completed another mural in Lawrence, Kansas.

== See also ==
- List of Native American artists
- List of people from Kansas
