= Mona Al Munajjed =

Saudi Arabian sociologist

Mona Al Munajjed (Arabic: منى المنجد) is a Saudi sociologist and expert on the social role of women in Arab countries. She has worked with several United Nations agencies on projects related to child labour, gender and development in Arab countries.

== Life ==
Mona Al Munajjed gained a MA in sociology from New York University and a PhD in sociology from George Washington University. as first social affairs officer at the United Nations Economic and Social Commission for Western Asia. Her project "Activating the Role of Women's Welfare Associations in Saudi Arabia", funded by Community Jameel, pioneered the funding of UN projects in Saudi Arabia by the private sector. In 2005 she received the UN 21 award for the project.

Since 2011 she has been named in CEO Middle East 's list of the 100 Most Powerful Arab Women. She was named as #7 in their list of the 100 Most Powerful Arab Women 2015.

== Works ==
- Mādhā tusammīna ibnataki : akthar min sitt miʼat ism min ajmal al-asmāʼ al-ʻArabīyah maʻa bayān maʻānīhā wa-man tasammat min al-mashhūrāt bi-hā, 1983
- Child labour in the Arab countries, 1994
- Women in Saudi Arabia Today, 1995
- Saudi Women Speak: 24 remarkable women tell their success stories, 2006
