= Mona Simion =

British philosopher

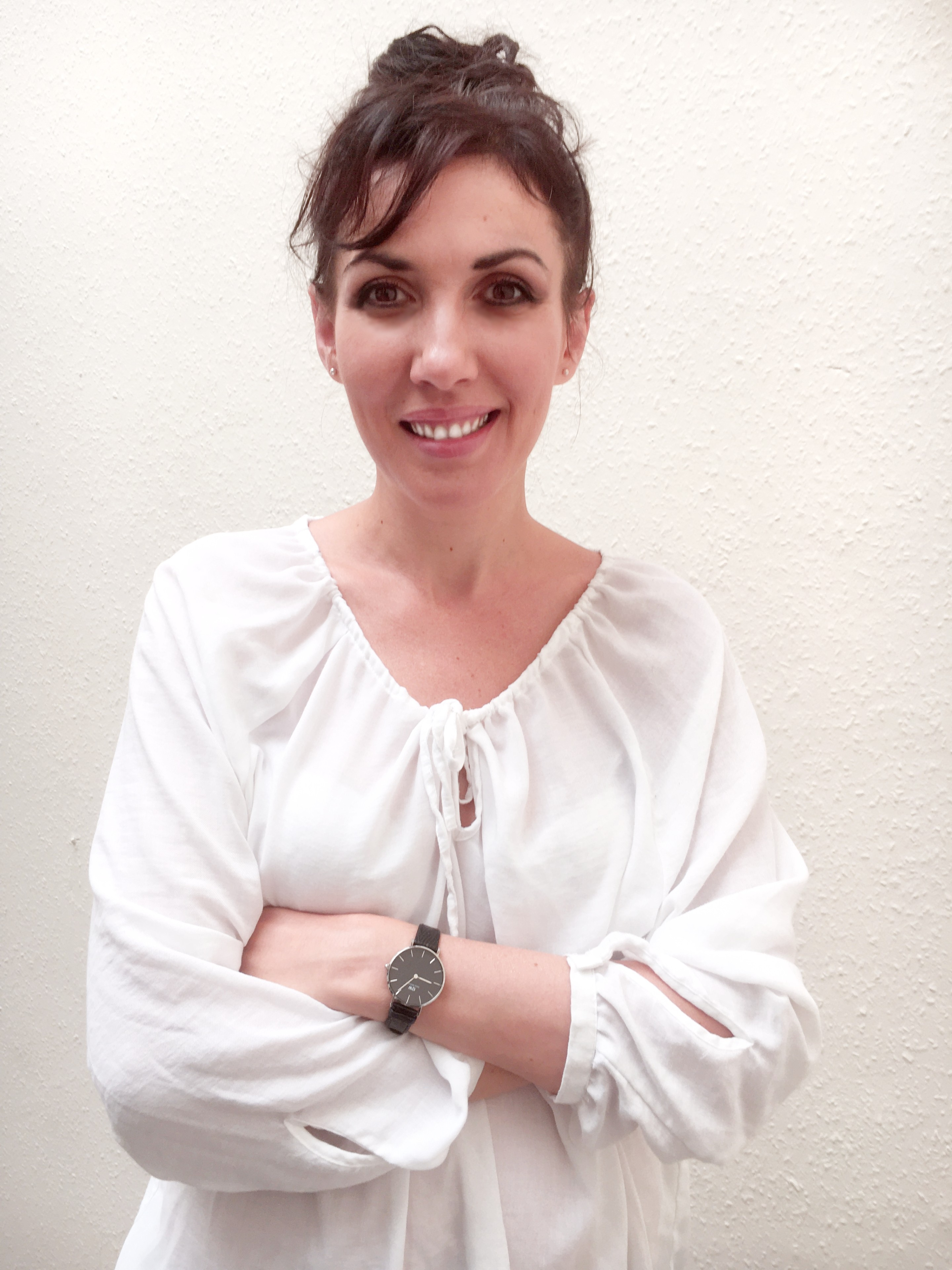

Academic background
- Education: University of St Andrews (PhD)

Academic work
- Discipline: Philosophy
- Institutions: University of Oxford
- Website: www.mona-simion.com

Mona Simion is a philosopher. She is Professor of Philosophy and Michael Cohen Fellow of Exeter College at the University of Oxford. She is also Ambassador of the European Research Council to the UK. Simion's work focuses on issues in epistemology, ethics, the philosophy of language, and feminist philosophy.

== Biography ==
Simion previously held positions at the University of Oslo's ConceptLab, at Cardiff University, and at the University of Glasgow, where she co-founded and co-directed the Cogito Epistemology Research Centre. She was promoted to full professor only four years after receiving her PhD in 2016.

Simion is an Elected Member of Academia Europaea, member of the executive committee of the Aristotelian Society, the management committee of BSTK – The British Society for the Theory of Knowledge, and the steering committee of the Social Epistemology Network. She is associate editor at Philosophical Studies, managing editor at Ergo, and on the editorial board of The Philosophical Quarterly and the Asian Journal of Philosophy.

She is principal investigator of a long-term grant funded by the European Research Council entitled ‘KnowledgeLab: Knowledge First Social Epistemology”, Co-Investigator (with Adam Carter, Daniele Faccio, Emma Gordon, Simon Hanslmayr, Monika Harvey, Christoph Kelp, and Lars Muckli) on a UKRI Cross-Council-funded project entitled ' Navigating the Neural Frontier: Embedding Ethics and Epistemology in Neurotech', and Co-Investigator (with Adam Carter, PI and Christoph Kelp) on a Leverhulme Trust-funded project entitled ‘A Virtue Epistemology of Trust’.

== Fellowships and awards ==
In 2018–2019, she held a Fellowship from the Mind Association for a project entitled ‘Epistemic Norms and Epistemic Functions’, and she won the Young Epistemologist Prize 2021 for her paper ‘Resistance to Evidence and the Duty to Believe’.

== Work ==
Simion has gained international acclaim for her work in epistemology and the philosophy of language. Besides this, she has worked on issues in moral and political philosophy, the philosophy of gender and race, and the philosophy of AI.

=== Epistemology ===
Simion's epistemological work has focused on the nature of epistemic normativity, epistemic norms of belief and assertion and knowledge first epistemology. She is best known for her work on evidence resistance, her functionalist account of epistemic normativity and her defence of a knowledge first approach to epistemology.

=== Philosophy of Language ===
In the philosophy of language, Simion is best known for her work on conceptual engineering and speech act theory. She has defended an account of the nature of assertion in terms of its function of generating knowledge and has developed a distinctively functionalist approach to conceptual engineering has been highly influential in the literature.

=== Moral and Political Philosophy, Feminist Philosophy, and Philosophy of AI ===
In moral philosophy, Simion has work on issues of moral psychology, in particular on questions relating to trust, trustworthiness, blame, and blameworthiness. She has developed novel accounts of blame as a type of performance and of trustworthiness (with Christoph Kelp) in terms of dispositions to comply with obligations.

In feminist philosophy, Simion's work has focused on epistemic injustice and conceptual engineering of gender terms. She has developed novel account of hermeneutical injustice in terms of basing failure and has argued that linguistic innovations for gender terms may serve to alleviate some of the historical injustices against women.

In the philosophy of AI, Simion's research has focused on questions about trustworthiness and explainability of AI systems.

=== Published Work ===
Simion is author of five monographs and over 80 research papers.

==== Monographs ====
- Simion, Mona (2021). Shifty speech and independent thought : epistemic normativity in context. Oxford: Oxford University Press. ISBN 978-0-19-264842-6. OCLC 1251804495.

Shifty speech and independent thought focuses on the relation between epistemic and practical normativity in thought and speech. It defends the independence of the epistemically good thought from the practical, and develops a full, integrated account of the epistemic normatively of constative speech.

- Kelp, Christoph; Simion, Mona (2022). Sharing knowledge : a functionalist account of assertion. Cambridge: Cambridge University Press. doi:10.1017/9781009036818. ISBN 978-1-009-03681-8. OCLC 1273423778. S2CID 244675662.

Sharing knowledge develops a functionalist approach to the nature and normativity of assertion. The central thesis is that assertion has the function of generating knowledge in others. The book develops novel accounts of what it takes for assertions to be good and the conditions under which it is permissible for us to make assertions.

- Simion, Mona (2024). Resistance to evidence. Cambridge: Cambridge University Press. ISBN 978-1-009-29853-7.

Resistance to evidence defends the view that epistemology must countenance duties to believe, and not just permissions. More specifically, the book makes a detailed and systematic case that we have duties to form and update beliefs in light of our evidence, analyses these duties in functionalist terms, and explores the phenomenon of resistance to evidence.

- Simion, Mona (2025). Knowledge-first epistemology. Cambridge: Cambridge University Press. ISBN 978-1-009-45496-4

Knowledge-first epistemology develops a systematic defence of functionalist knowledge first epistemology, the view that epistemic practice has the function of producing knowledge and that, as a result, knowledge is an epistemic phenomenon with fundamental normative status; other epistemic phenomena (such as justification, evidence and defeat) are analysed in terms of knowledge.

- Simion, Mona; Kelp, Christoph (2026). Knowledge and conceptual engineering: the epistemology, ethics, and politics of meaning production. Oxford: Oxford University Press. ISBN 978-0-19-891802-8

Knowledge and conceptual engineering provides a systematic and unified functionalist approach to conceptual engineering, according to which we can, may, and often should engage in conceptual engineering.

==== Edited Volumes ====
- Brown, Jessica; Simion, Mona (2021). Reasons, justification, and defeat. Oxford: Oxford University Press. ISBN 978-0-19-258649-0. OCLC 1245671247.
