= Shaikha Al-Bahar =

Kuwaiti CEO

- شيخة البحر
- Born: Shaikha Khalid Ali Al-Bahar
- Occupation: Deputy Group CEO of the National Bank of Kuwait

Shaikha Al-Bahar (Arabic: شيخة البحر) is the Deputy Group CEO of the National Bank of Kuwait (NBK)

== Education ==
Al-Bahar received a Bachelor of Science degree in International Marketing from Kuwait University, additionally, she attended specialized management programs at different institutions, including Harvard Business School, Stanford University, Wharton School, and Duke University.

== Career ==
Prior to serving as the Deputy Group CEO of the National Bank of Kuwait in 2014, the largest financial institution in Kuwait and one of the largest banks in the Middle East, she was the CEO of NBK-Kuwait, and held multiple executive positions at the group, playing a noted role in the group's expansion. In the early 1990s, she was involved in the Kuwait Investment Authority privatization deals.

Al-Bahar also serves as director of Mobile Telecommunications Company KSC, vice chairman of Watani Investment Company KSCC. She is also on the board of the International Bank of Qatar. She is a member of Kuwait's Supreme Council for Planning and Development. Al-Bahar was the Chairman of Al Asima Real Estate.

== Recognition ==
Al-Bahar was ranked the 85th most powerful woman in the world by Forbes in 2012, the same year Forbes Middle East listed her in the first place in their Top 100 Most Powerful Arab Business Women in Listed Companies. Al-Bahar was ranked as the 8th most powerful Arab woman of 2012 by Arabian Business.
