= Mona Weissmark =

American clinical and social psychologist

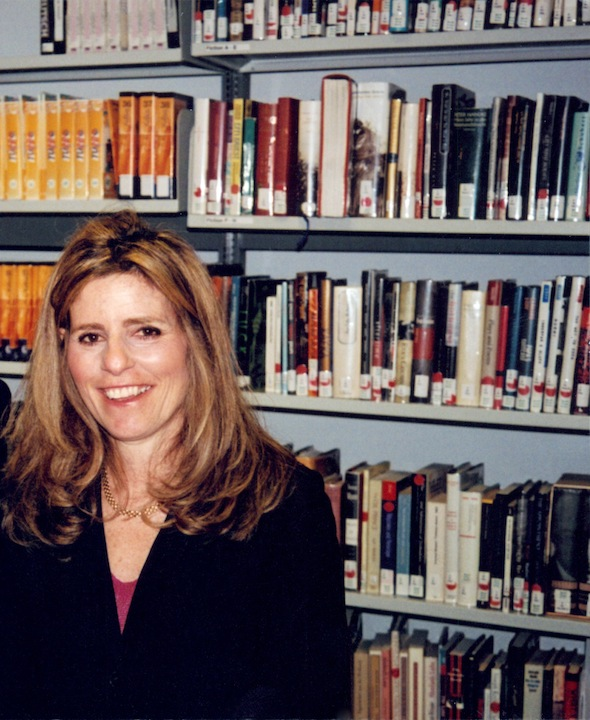
Photograph of Dr. Mona Weissmark giving a lecture at The Goethe-Institute.

Mona Sue Weissmark is an American clinical psychologist and social psychologist, whose work on the inter-generational impact of injustice has received international recognition. She is best known for her groundbreaking social experiment of bringing children of Holocaust survivors face-to-face with children of Nazis, and later, grandchildren and great-grandchildren of African American slaves with slave owners. She is also a professor of psychology at Northwestern University and author of numerous journal articles and three books: Doing Psychotherapy Effectively (University of Chicago Press) and Justice Matters: Legacies of the Holocaust and World War II (Oxford University Press), and The Science of Diversity (Oxford University Press).

== Biography ==
=== Career ===
Weissmark received a bachelor's degree at McGill University in 1977 and a doctorate degree at the University of Pennsylvania in 1986. She went on to pursue a postdoctoral fellowship in the department of Psychology at Harvard University from 1987 until 1990, and in 1991 became a lecturer at Harvard Medical School, teaching graduate courses on research methods. In 1994, she moved to Chicago and joined the faculty at Roosevelt University as a tenured associate professor of psychology (1994–2005) and also joined the department of Psychology at Northwestern University as a visiting scholar (1994–2003). In 2004, Weissmark was named visiting associate professor of psychology at Northwestern University and founded the Global Mental Health Studies Program part of The Buffett Institute, where she now teaches "Psychology of Diversity" and conducts research on the psychology of justice. She also is a visiting professor of psychology at Harvard University where she also teaches "Psychology of Diversity".

=== Personal ===
Weissmark was born in Vineland, New Jersey. She lives in Evanston, Illinois with her husband, a University of Chicago psychiatrist. They have one daughter.

== Main work ==
=== Clinical Psychology ===
Weissmark's initial research in graduate school was in clinical psychology, where she explored the links between theory and practice and outlined a theory of how therapists think in action.

=== Psychotherapy ===
During her postdoctoral fellowship at Harvard, Weissmark became interested in studying the empirical predictors of psychotherapy effectiveness. Subsequently, she headed the Harvard Psychotherapy Research Project and published Doing Psychotherapy Effectively (1998). The book presents a summary of her empirical research on how therapy works and provides a tool for measuring therapeutic effectiveness and understanding human transformation.

=== Psychology of Justice ===
==== A groundbreaking social experiment ====
At Harvard, Weissmark also developed a deep-seated interest in the psychology of justice, which eventually dominated her research activities. Over the past 15 years, her work has focussed on the relational impact of injustice. Both her parents were Holocaust survivors and apart from them, her entire family was killed by the Nazis. That legacy has indelibly marked her own life experience and professional choices.

Weissmark hypothesized that although legal systems offer some forms of redress to the victims of injustice, they rarely address the emotional pain. Left unresolved, the pain and sense of injustice are then passed along to the next generation, leading to entrenched group tension and conflict. She also speculated that children of victims and children of perpetrators have a lot in common.

To test these hypotheses, Weissmark pioneered a unique social experiment. In 1992 at Harvard University, she brought together children of Holocaust survivors and children of Nazis. The following year, she replicated the meeting in Germany. Then in 1995, in Chicago, she brought descendants of African American slaves face-to-face with descendants of slave owners.

The purpose of bringing two such disparate sides together was "not to forget or forgive the past, but create a new future," Weissmark said. The findings from the meetings showed that the cycle of hatred could be transformed if both parties were willing to put aside the notion they were the most aggrieved and were prepared to see the other side.

==== Media coverage ====
The meetings received extensive national and international media attention, with articles in the Chicago Tribune, The New York Times, Psychology Today, Ms., The Jerusalem Report, She magazine, The Guardian and Frankfurter Allgemeine Zeitung, among other publications. They were also featured on television programs, including National Public Radio's All Things Considered, the BBC, the CBS News Sunday Morning, and Dateline NBC.

==== Justice Matters ====
In 2004, Weissmark wrote Justice Matters: Legacies of the Holocaust and World War II. The book's findings provide a new framework for understanding the psychology of injustice, which could be applied to many conflicts stemming from centuries-old disputes, such as those in Israel, Northern Ireland, Bosnia, Rwanda or Sri Lanka.

In 2006 Justice Matters was made into a documentary television film, aired on national German television WDR. The film, Seeing the Other Side – 60 years after Buchenwald, also has been distributed to schools and churches across the country.

==== Institute for Social Justice Studies ====
Weissmark wanted her research to have relevance outside the realm of academia and be available to the general public. In 1999, thanks to a generous gift, she created the Institute for Social Justice Studies in Chicago and remained director until 2004. The Institute sponsored social science research on social justice, diversity, discrimination, among other issues, and organized guest lectures, seminars and conferences open to both specialists and the general public.

==== The Science of Diversity ====
In 2017, Weissmark wrote The Science of Diversity (forthcoming 2020, Oxford University Press). The Science of Diversity uses a multidisciplinary approach to excavate the theories, principles, and paradigms that illuminate our understanding of the issues surrounding human diversity, social equality, and justice.

Weissmark, assembles a rich array of research from anthropology, biology, religious studies, and the social sciences, among other fields to write a scholarly diorama of diversity. This book, designed to be accessible to undergraduate students, contextualizes diversity historically, tracing the evolution of ideas about "the other" and about "we" and "them" to various forms of social organization, from the "hunter-gather", face-to-face, shared resource model to the anomie of megacities.

Moreover, The Science of Diversity, explicates the concept of diversity, parsing its meaning over time, place, and polity—from ancient Greece to the time of Trump, from biblical parables to United Nations pronouncements. Nevertheless, the connecting threads weaving this multidimensional work together are pulled from the field of psychology, and these help provide important structure to the ideas of diversity presented. The book then brings these to the surface holistically, examining diversity on the individual, interpersonal, and international levels.

Most significantly, The Science of Diversity is also prescriptive. Drawing on the author's groundbreaking research work with the children of Nazis and the children of holocaust survivors, the book suggests that one potential antidote to ethnic strife lies in the pursuit of Kant's mandate, sapere aude (dare to know), combined with the development of compassion. To that end, the book explores the use of scientific thinking as one way we can dare to know "the other".

==== Additional Newspaper and Magazine Articles ====
A series of articles in scientific literature, Psychology Today, provide targeted exploration of the topics investigated within the context of the book.

Dr. Weissmark wrote an opinion piece for the Chicago Tribune entitled "Commentary: Can the world agree upon a 'common memory' of the Holocaust?"

She has also explored via research discussed in a blog post to Psychology Today why attempts at outlawing bias are likely to fail.

An interview in the University of Pennsylvania GSE Alumni Magazine exists in PDF form and can be found at the Issuu Inc. website.

In an article in Psychology Today Dr. Weissmark examines and explains why many famous psychological studies cannot be reproduced.

An additional article describes how bias interventions are ineffective. Dr. Weissmark discussed similar themes with Michelle King on The Fix Podcast.

In this article Dr. Weissmark examines the current body of work regarding the workplace policies intended to ban discrimination.

An earlier article reviews the state of psychology research.

This is an earlier article written by Dr. Weissmark regarding potentially effective methods of reducing prejudice.
