= Mouna (given name) =

Mouna is a feminine given name of Arabic origin. Notable people with the name include:

== Given name ==
- Mouna Osman Aden, Djiboutian politician
- Mouna-Hodan Ahmed (born 1972), Djiboutian writer
- Mouna Ayoub (born 1957), Kuwaiti-born French socialite and businesswoman of Lebanese origin
- Mouna Benabderrassoul (born 1984), Moroccan taekwondo athlete
- Mouna Chebbah (born 1982), Tunisian handball player
- Mouna Esmaeilzadeh (born 1980), Swedish-Iranian medical doctor, neuroscientist, entrepreneur, and TV personality
- Mouna Fettou (born 1970), Moroccan actress
- Mouna Hachim (born 1967), Moroccan writer
- Mouna Hannachi, Tunisian football manager and player
- Mouna Jlezi (born 1991), Tunisian handball player
- Mouna Karray (born 1970), Tunisian photographer and video artist
- Mouna Noureddine (born 1937), Tunisian actress
- Mouna Sabri (born 1984), Moroccan tennis player
- Mouna Bassili Sehnaoui (born 1945), Lebanese painter, writer, and artist
- Mouna Soualem, French film and television actress
- Mouna Traoré (born 1995), Canadian actress and filmmaker
