= Mona Khazindar =

Saudi-American art historian

- منى خزندار
- Born: 1959 (age 66–67); United States
- Education: American University of Paris; Sorbonne University
- Occupations: Art historian Curator; Author
- Known for: Director General of the Institut du Monde Arabe
- Notable work: View from the Inside (2014); Visions from Abroad (2019)
- Awards: Woman of the Year (2012)

Mona Khazindar (Arabic: منى خزندار; born 1959) is a Saudi-American art historian and curator. She was the Director General of the Institut du Monde Arabe from 2011 to 2014.

== Early life and education ==
Khazindar was born in the United States. Her father, Abed Khazindar, was an author studying in the country at the time, and her mother, Shams al-Husseini Khazindar, was a journalist.

Khazindar studied comparative literature at the American University of Paris, and modern history at Sorbonne University.

== Career ==
Khazindar began working at the Institut du Monde Arabe in 1986 as the head of the Department of Contemporary Art and Photography, and as an overseer of the institute's permanent art collection.

In 2011, Khazindar was made Director General of the Institut du Monde Arabe, making her the first women and first Saudi to hold the position. That same year, she co-curated the Saudi pavilion at the 54th Venice Bienniale, the first time Saudi Arabia had such a pavilion. In 2012, the French Minister of Culture appointed Khazindar to the Museum of European and Mediterranean Civilisations as a permanent member.

Khazindar has also been involved with Saudi organizations; from 2014 to 2015, she was a cultural advisor to the Saudi Ministry of Tourism, and in 2018 she was appointed to the Saudi Cultural Authority by royal decree. She is also a member of the advisory board of the King Abdulaziz Center of World Culture, and the Saudi Shoura Council. As part of her role with the King Adulaziz Center, Khazindar has toured in the United States to discuss the history of Saudi Arabia through art.

Khazindar has founded Al Mansouria Foundation for Culture and Creativity, which promotes Arab contemporary art.

Khazindar has published two books: View from the Inside: Contemporary Arab Photography, Video and Mixed Media Art (2014), and Visions from Abroad: Historical and Contemporary Representations of Saudi Arabia (2019). She has also edited books on Saudi and Arab artists, such as Abdulrahman Alsoliman and Adam Henein.

== Awards ==
- 2012 Woman of the Year, the Forum of Arab Women

== Personal life ==
Khazindar is fluent in Arabic, French, and English. As of 2017, she was living in Riyadh.
