= Mona al-Kuwari =

Bahraini judge, academic, and author

- منى الكواري
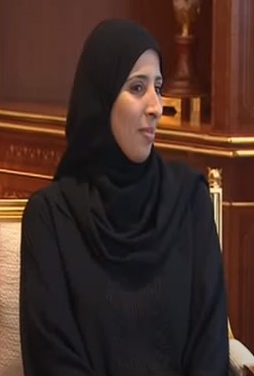
- Mona al-Kuwari, 10 May 2016
- Born: Mona Jassim Mohammed al-Kuwari
- Education: Doctor of Criminal Justice
- Alma mater: Beirut Arab University Faculty of Law
- Occupation(s): judge, professor, author
- Years active: 2003—Present
- Employer: University of Bahrain
- Known for: first woman to serve on a High Court in the Gulf

Mona Jassim Mohammed al-Kuwari (Arabic: منى جاسم محمد الكواري, is a Bahraini judge, academic, and author. She is currently a member of the Constitutional Court, the first woman in the Gulf to sit on such a court, which includes two other judges and a secretary.

== Early life and education ==
Al-Kuwari studied at the Beirut Arab University Faculty of Law and Political Science, earning a Bachelor of Arts in Law in 2000, a postgraduate diploma in Public Law in 2005, a Master of Studies in Law in Criminal Law in 2007 for the thesis التفتيش شروطه وحالات بطلانه دراسة مقارنة (“Investigations: Conditions and Contraindications, a Comparative Study”), and a Doctor of Criminal Justice in 2013 for the thesis جريمة التزوير الإلكتروني دراسة مقارنة (“Electronic Fraud: A Comparative Study”).

== Career ==
Al-Kuwari began her career as a professor at the University of Bahrain.

She served as a Public Prosecutor from 2003 to 2006.

In June 2006, King Hamad bin Isa Al Khalifa appointed her to the Juvenile Court, making her the first woman judge in the Gulf. She served there until 2010, moving on to representing the government at the Supreme Civil Court (2011-2012) and Supreme Civil Court of Appeal (2012). She was President of the Supreme Civil Administrative Court in 2013 and from 2013 to 2014 held the same office in the Supreme Labor Court. She served from 2014 to 2016 on the Supreme Civil Court of Appeal.

On April 25, 2016, the King issued Royal Decree No. 19 of that year, appointing Al-Kuwari to a five-year term on the Constitutional Court.

=== Conferences ===
Al-Kuwari participated in many regional and global conferences and seminars, including the following:

- 3rd Annual Conference of the Arab Women’s Legal Network (AWLN) (June 13-15, 2007)
- Judicial Skills Development Course at the Arab Center for Consulting and Training Services (Egypt, May 4-11, 2008)
- Integrated Legal Affairs Program (Egypt, January 5-17, 2009)
- Workshop on Practical Problems in Labor Disputes at Judicial and Legal Studies Institute of the Ministry of Justice (Bahrain) (2009)
- 4th Annual AWLN Conference launching Project for Strengthening Legislative Drafting Capabilities (Amman, Jordan, 2009)
- Speech at “Gender and Justice” conference in Washington, D.C. (June 14-16, 2009)
- Working visit to the United States of America (June 16-26, 2009)
- 2nd Conference of the World Justice Forum in Vienna, Austria (November 11-14, 2009)
- United Nations Office on Drugs and Crime (UNODC) Conference on Human Trafficking at the Crossroads in Manama, Bahrain (2009)
- Conference on Best Practices in Enhancing Judicial Accountability in Manama (2010)
- Workshop on the Use of Experts among Civil Court Judges, Judicial and Legal Studies Institute, Bahrain (2010)
- Conference on Unifying Forces in a Changing World in Kuwait (March 7-8, 2010)
- Diwaniyah Forum of Female Lawyers in Kuwait (May 10-16, 2011)
- Training Course in Italy (July 19-28, 2012)
- 5th Meeting of the AWLN Administrative Board in Jordan (October 1-3, 2012)
- Lectures at the Kuwait University College of Law (April 8-30, 2013)
- AWLN Administrative Board Meeting (July 12-20, 2013)

=== Organization and committee memberships ===
- AWLN, Jordan
- Former Member of By-Elections Administrative Board, AWLN
- Legal Institute for Arbitrators in London
- Chair of Elections Supervising Committee for the 2006 Bahraini general election and 2014 Bahraini general election (the latter under Royal Decree No. 26 of 2014)
- Financial Disclosures' Examination Authority (May 4, 2014-May 3, 2016, pursuant to above Decree)
- Judicial Committee for the Settlement of Stalled Real Estate Projects (Royal Decree No. 66 of 2015)

=== Publications ===
- الحبس الاحتياطي (“Pretrial Detention”)
- القيود والأوصاف (“Restrictions and Descriptions”)
- التفتيش شروطه وحالات بطلانه (“Investigations: Conditions and Contraindications”)
- التزوير الإلكتروني (“Electronic Fraud: A Comparative Study”)

== Awards ==
In 2016, Al-Kuwari was honored as a pioneer in holding judicial positions locally and internationally by the Supreme Council for Women of Bahrain.

On March 18, 2019, the Dunya Sisters Council for Community Development honored her among a number of pioneering figures in the Arab world.
