= Mona Anita K. Olsen =

Single Mother

Mona Olsen is a British-American entrepreneur and academic. Olsen is the founder and president of the board of iMADdu Inc., an educational nonprofit (501c3) based in Fairfax, Virginia that launched in 2010.

Olsen joined the Cornell University faculty in 2013 and is an assistant professor of entrepreneurship in the Cornell SC Johnson College of Business, in The School of Hotel Administration. She was the academic director of the Leland C. and Mary M. Pillsbury Institute for Hospitality Entrepreneurship. Mona Anita was a Fulbright Fellow in Education to Norway, awarded by the United States Department of State and the J. William Fulbright Foreign Scholarship Board in 2012–2013.

== Education ==
Olsen received her PhD in education from The Graduate School of Education at George Mason University. Olsen also holds a master's degree in management of information technology from The McIntire School of Commerce at the University of Virginia and a Bachelor of Science with Distinction from The School of Hotel Administration at Cornell University. She attended Nishimachi International School in Tokyo, Japan.

== Career ==
Olsen developed and currently teaches courses on entrepreneurship theory and practice as an assistant professor. She has received a Small Private Online Class (SPOC) grant from the vice provost's office to develop HADM 4180x MAD Clouds: Making a Difference with Cloud-Based Technology in Entrepreneurial Business Planning, the Mario Einaudi Center for International Studies Small Grant for the course development of Global Conversations with Entrepreneurs, and the Luigi Einaudi Chair Innovation Grant for the International Academic Partnership Program (IAPP) Norway.

During her first year as a faculty member at Cornell University, Olsen established the Connect Entrepreneurial Hotelies mentor network. The program connects young alumni and current students with school alumni who have had successful entrepreneurial ventures. She also aided in the establishment of The School of Hotel Administration's Entrepreneurship Concentration.

She was the principal investigator on the Coleman Foundation Faculty Fellows Grant at Cornell University and served as program director for AY 2014-2015.

She was a recipient of the Fulbright U.S. Student Scholarship and Fulbright Grantee to Norway. She also served at the 2014 Fulbright Enrichment Seminar in Oregon and the 2015 Fulbright Enrichment Seminar in Pittsburgh, being sponsored by the United States Department through the Institute of International Education.

Olsen published From Concept to Impact: Beginning with the End in Mind Highlights from the 2015 Cornell Hospitality Entrepreneurship Roundtable in 2015.

While in Norway, she worked on the Operations & Venue Planning for TEDx Stavanger 2013. Fulfilling one of her child dreams, Olsen founded iMADdu – an educational nonprofit organization. Standing for “I Make A Difference, Do you?”, iMADdu empowers young entrepreneurs through mentoring and participation in its Student Apprenticeship Program (SAP). Through iMADdu, Olsen brought the Extreme Entrepreneurship Tour to George Mason University. A former research faculty member at George Mason University, Olsen served as the assistant director of Mason Small Business Development Center at the Office of Research & Economic Development.
