= Mona Magdi Salim =

Sudanese singer

- Citizenship: Sudan
- Occupation: Singer
- Known for: Arrest under Sudan's Public Order Law for "indecent clothing"

Mona Magdy Salim is a Sudanese singer who in October 2018, under article 152 of the Sudanese Penal Code of 1999, was arrested for wearing "indecent clothes", lycra trousers.

== Incident ==
On 18 October 2018, Salim was arrested after performing at a cultural event in Khartoum while wearing trousers and a long-sleeved top. She was charged with dressing indecently and faced the possibility of flogging if convicted. Her trial was later postponed indefinitely.

The case highlighted ongoing debates about women's rights, public morality laws, and the enforcement of Sudan's Public Order regulations under the government of Omar al-Bashir.

== See also ==
- Islam in Sudan – Most common religion in Sudan
