= Muna Lee =

Muna Lee may refer to:

- Muna Lee (writer) (1895–1965), American poet and first wife of Luis Muñoz Marín, Puerto Rico's first elected governor
- Muna Lee (sprinter) (born 1981), American athlete
