= Mona Ghaderi =

Iranian former professional volleyball player (born 1980)

- مونا قادری
- Born: May 24, 1980 (age 46)
- Occupation: Athlete
- Known for: Deputy chairwoman of Women Padel Association of Iran, Manager of Women’s National Padel team
- Website: monaghaderi.ir

Mona Ghaderi (Persian: مونا قادری, born May 24, 1980) is an Iranian former professional volleyball player and the current manager of Iran's national women's padel team.

== Career ==
Ghaderi started playing football at a young age and was later invited to the national volleyball team. After participating in the Iranian Volleyball League, she turned to padel in 2015. She is currently heading the national padel team of Iran after receiving first-class certification. In 2022, she was appointed as the deputy chairwoman of the Women Padel Association of Iran.

== Personal life ==
Her father is Khosrow Ghaderi, who was an athlete and volleyball coach.
