= Faten Al-Naqeeb =

Kuwaiti lawyer (born 1964)

Faten Farouq Al-Naqeeb (born 1964) is a Kuwaiti lawyer. She is the principal managing partner of Al Naqeeb & Partners.

Al-Naqeeb was born in 1964 in Kuwait. She attended Kuwait University, receiving a Bachelor of Law degree from the Faculty of Law and Shariaa in 1987. She is licensed to practise law before Kuwait's High Appeal, Cassation, and Constitutional Courts. Following her degree, she worked at law firm Nabil Ahmad Al-Naqeeb as an associate. In 1991 she worked as a legal consultant and headed the Kuwaiti legal team that reviewed and submitted the Kuwaiti Compensation Claims against Iraq to the United Nations Compensation Commission. She also represented Kuwait on the same commission. Afterwards she founded the law firm now known as Al Naqeeb & Partners. Al-Naqeeb received her masters in international law from Cambridge College, United Kingdom.

Al-Naqeeb has counselled United States oil companies, including ExxonMobil, in navigating the Kuwaiti oil sector. She is a board member of ACICO. In 2015, Al-Naqeeb wrote the book The Legal Guide to Doing Business in Kuwait.

She is fluent in Arabic, French, and English. Arabian Business magazine named her one of the 100 most powerful Arab women in 2013.
