= Munaq =

Munaq مونق
- Village
- Location within Iran
- Coordinates: 37°33′53″N 47°42′57″E
- Country: Iran
- Province: East Azerbaijan
- County: Meyaneh
- Bakhsh: Kandovan
- Rural District: Kandovan

Population (2006)
  - Total: 259
- Time zone: UTC+3:30 (IRST)
  - Summer (DST): UTC+4:30 (IRDT)

Munaq (Persian: مونق, also Romanized as Mūnaq and Mownaq; also known as Monaq and Muna) is a village in Kandovan Rural District, Kandovan District, Meyaneh County, East Azerbaijan Province, Iran. At the 2006 census, its population was 259, in 62 families.
