= Mona Gould =

Canadian poet and broadcaster

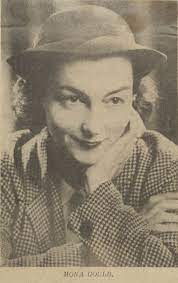
- Born: January 25, 1908; Prince Albert, Saskatchewan
- Died: March 8, 1999 (aged 91); Collingwood, Ontario
- Other names: Mona McTavish
- Occupations: Poet, journalist, broadcaster
- Known for: Poem "This Was My Brother"

Mona McTavish Gould (January 25, 1908 - March 8, 1999) was a Canadian poet, journalist, and broadcaster. Her most famous poem, "This Was My Brother," was inspired by her brother's death during World War II, and was reprinted in various anthologies.

== Early life ==
Gould was born Mona McTavish in Prince Albert, Saskatchewan. Her family moved to London, Ontario when she was seven years old. In high school, Gould contributed frequently to theToronto Globe's "Circle of Young Canada" section. In 1929, while living in St. Thomas, Ontario, and writing for the St. Thomas Times-Journal, Gould married Jack Graham Gould. Their son, John Gould, was born that same year.

== Career ==
In the 1930s, Gould published poetry in Chatelaine, Canadian Forum, and Saturday Night. During the war, Gould moved to Toronto and started working at an advertising agency. Her brother, Lieutenant Colonel Gordon Howard McTavish, died in 1942 in the Dieppe raid. This event inspired Gould to write the poem "This Was My Brother" in his honour. The poem was well received and used as a part of victory bond campaigns. Gould published three collections of poems in the 1940s: Tasting the Earth (1943), I Run With the Fox (1946), and Gossip! (1948). Tasting the Earth received favourable reviews, including praise from E.J. Pratt.

In 1948, Gould began her career as a radio personality. She initially worked as a broadcaster for CKEY in Toronto where she hosted the program Ladies Listen; and later moved to CKFH in 1957, where she hosted Be My Guest. She also worked as a columnist, contributing to New Liberty magazine and Gossip magazine.
