= Mona Loutfy =

Canadian clinician-scientist

Academic background
- Education: Bsc, University of Western Ontario; MD, Medicine, 1995, University of Toronto; MPH, Clinical Effectiveness, 2002, Harvard T.H. Chan School of Public Health

Academic work
- Institutions: Women's College Hospital; University of Toronto

Mona R. Loutfy is a Canadian clinician-scientist and infectious disease specialist.

== Early life and education ==
Loutfy earned her Bachelor of Science degree from the University of Western Ontario and her medical degree from the University of Toronto. Following this, she completed her Internal Medicine Residency in 1999 and her Infectious Diseases Fellowship in 2001 at the University of Toronto. Loutfy then did a Master's of Public Health at Harvard T.H. Chan School of Public Health in 2002 and a Canadian Institutes of Health Research Postdoctoral Research Fellowship at McGill University.

== Career ==
Upon leaving McGill, Loutfy joined the faculty at Women's College Hospital where she led the creation of the Women and HIV Research Program. She was also recognized by Ministry of Research, Innovation and Science with an Early Researcher Award in 2008. The following year, Loutfy and her research team began focusing on promoting reproductive health in HIV-positive women in Ontario. Her team found that out of nearly 4,000 HIV-positive women of reproductive age in Ontario, 69 per cent who are in their reproductive years want to get pregnant. They subsequently published the first accurate measurement of the need to help HIV-positive women in Ontario have children, including developing provincial and national pregnancy clinical planning guidelines for people with HIV.

In August 2016, Loutfy was appointed the leader of the Canadian HIV Women’s Sexual and Reproductive Health Cohort Study (CHIWOS). The study aimed at documenting the experiences of more than HIV-positive women living in Ontario, Quebec, British Columbia, Saskatchewan, and Manitoba. She also visited two First Nations communities four times a year to see patients and work with communities to address their HIV epidemic. While serving in this role, she was also the recipient of a Canadian Association for HIV Research and the Canadian Foundation for AIDS' Research Excellence in HIV Research Award. The following year, Loutfy and her CHIWOS research team published a study finding that HIV-positive women felt their health needs were lacking in areas around pregnancy planning, Pap testing, mammograms and psychological well-being.

In March 2018, Loutfy helped lead the revision of the Canadian HIV Pregnancy Planning Guidelines which included "36 recommendations to provide clinical information and recommendations for health care providers' counselling and care." On May 3, Loutfy was promoted to the rank of Full professor at the University of Toronto's Department of Medicine.
