= Mona Almoayyed =

Bahraini businesswoman

- Born: Mona Almoayyed
- Education: University of Westminster
- Occupation: Businesswoman
- Notable work: Former head of the Bahrain Businesswomen’s Society.
- Awards: The 50 Most Powerful Personalities in the Kingdom of Bahrain.; The Most Powerful Arab Women.

Mona Yousuf Almoayyed (Arabic: منى المؤيد) is a Bahraini businesswoman and a member of the Consultative Council (Shura Council). She is the Managing Director of Yusef Khalil Almoayyed & Sons, a retail and wholesale business in Bahrain. She is also the former head of the Bahrain Businesswomen's Society, established in 2000 to encourage Bahraini women participation in the economy.

== Early life and education ==
Mona Almoayyed was born in Bahrain, the daughter of entrepreneur Yusef Khalil Moayyed. She received her Bachelor of Arts in Business Administration from the University of Westminster in London in 1986.

== Career ==
From 1974 to 2000, Almoayyed served as Executive Director of the Automobile Division at Yusef Khalil Almoayyed & Sons. The business markets over a hundred brands of luxury goods, appliances, heavy equipment, medical technology, and concrete.

She was President of the Bahrain Businesswomen’s Society for three terms (2006–2012), and led the Migrant Workers Protection Society in Bahrain from 2005 to 2011.

She is also the former vice-chairwoman of the Gulf Businesswomen Committee, an initiative of the Gulf Cooperation Council Chambers of Commerce Union.

She chairs the Business Women’s Committee at the Bahrain Chamber of Commerce and Industry.

== Awards ==
Almoayyed was ranked twelfth in Forbes Magazine’s 2008 study “The Most Powerful Arab Women" and fourth on their list of “The 50 Most Powerful Personalities in the Kingdom of Bahrain". In 2012, Arabian Business named Almoayyed on their list of the “500 Most Powerful People in the Arab World.”

== Board memberships ==
- YK Al Moayyed & Sons, Member of Board of Directors and Executive Committee, 2000–Present
- Bahrain Chamber of Commerce and Industry, Member of Board of Directors, 2000
- Bahrain Businesswomen’s Association, Member of Board of Directors and Financial Secretary, 2000–2002
- Ministry of Social Development, Child Welfare Home (Batelco Home), Member of Board of Directors, 2000–Present
- Bahrain Garden Club, Member, 1992–2003, 2004–Present
- Bahrain Businesswomen’s Society, Member, 2003–2005
- Arab League Women’s Affairs Committee, Member, 2000–2005
