= Muna Al Hashemi =

Bahraini businesswoman

- Born: 1971 (age 54–55); Bahrain
- Occupation: Deputy CEO of Batelco Group
- Years active: 1994-present

Muna Al Hashemi (Arabic: منى الهاشمي, born 1971) is a Bahraini businesswoman and deputy CEO of the Batelco Group.

She was the CEO of Batelco from 2015 to 2017, before assuming her current position. She was ranked 15th by Forbes Middle East amongst the '100 Most Influential Women in the Middle East'. She was also named by Arabian Business as one of the '30 Most Influential Women in the Arab World' in 2019.

== Education ==
Al Hashemi was born in Bahrain in 1971. She earned a bachelor's degree in electrical engineering from the University of Bahrain alongside a master's degree in electronics and communication in 1994.

== Career ==
Al Hasehmi joined Batelco as a trainee engineering graduate in 1994. Her tenure as CEO of Batelco from 2015 to 2017 coincided with the liberalisation of Bahrain's telecom industry against Batelco's monopoly. Under her leadership, Batelco became the first telecom company to launch 4G internet in Bahrain.

In 2017, she was appointed as deputy CEO of the Batelco Group, an international telecommunications group with operations in 14 countries including Batelco itself.

In 2018, she was ranked 15th by Forbes Middle East amongst the 100 Most Influential Women in the Middle East, having previously been featured on the list for 4 consecutive years.

Al Hashemi is a board member of the Jordanian telecom company Umniah, as well as the Bahraini tech start-up company C5 Nebula. She also is as a board member on the Supreme Council for Women in the Bahrain.
