= Mona Fayad =

Lebanese writer and political activist

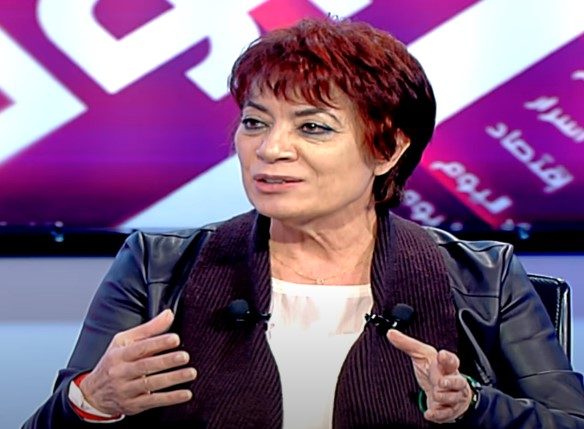
- Mona Fayad during a TV interview on MTV Lebanon's "Beirut Al Yawm" program in November 2019
- Born: 1950 (age 75–76) Southern Lebanon
- Language: French

Dr. Mona Fayad (Arabic: منى فياض, born 1950) is a francophone Lebanese intellectual, writer, and political activist. She is one of the most prominent Shiite opponents of Hezbollah. She is a professor of psychology at the Lebanese University.

== Biography ==
She teaches psychology at the Lebanese University in Beirut. She is a member of the Lebanese Association of Women Researchers. In 2001, she was a founding member of the Democratic Renewal Movement headed by Nassib Lahoud, and was a member of committee until 2010.

=== Opposition to Hezbollah ===
Fayad is one of the most prominent Shiite opponents of Hezbollah.

She became known to the public during the 2006 Lebanon-Israeli war between Hezbollah and Israel, throughout numerous articles in which she criticized the blackmail and pressures that the Shiite intellectuals went through from Hezbollah.

Fayad strongly condemned the assassination of her colleague, Lukman Slim, in 2021, suggesting Hezbollah was behind the assassination.

== Publications ==
- The Body in the Trap, Dar Al Rais, Beirut, 2000.
- The Child Schoole’s Education in The Family and Cultural Space, Arab cultural center, Beirut-Rabat, 2004.
- Arab Culturel’s Masques, Dar athakafa, Cairo, 2006.
- To be Lebanese, Dar alarabyah lilouloum, Beirut, 2008.
- How to Deal With Violence That Exists Among Us, Dar Al Nahda, Beirut, 2012.
