= Outline of Algeria =

Country in Northwest Africa

The Flag of Algeria

The location of Algeria

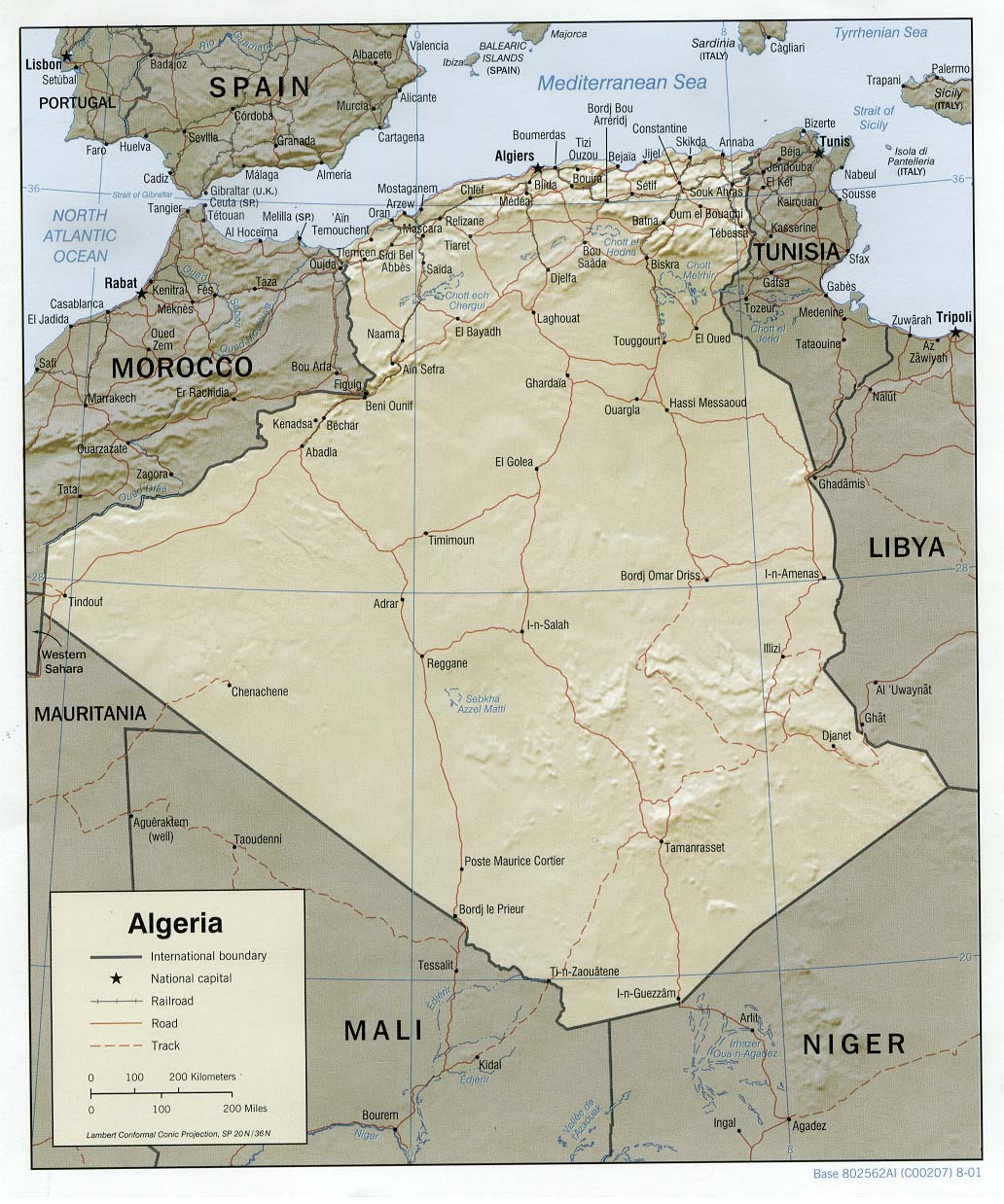
An enlargeable relief map of the Algeria

The following outline is provided as an overview of and topical guide to Algeria:

Algeria is located in the Maghreb region of Northwest Africa with Algiers as its capital.

== General reference ==
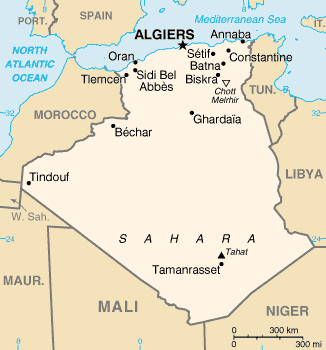
An enlargeable basic map of Algeria

- Pronunciation:/ælˈdʒɪəriə/ or /ɔːl-/
- Common English country name: Algeria
- Official English country name: The People's Democratic Republic of Algeria
- Common endonym(s): Dzayer, Al-Jazā'ir, الجزائر
- Official endonym(s): Tagduda Tadzayrit Tugduyant Tagherfant, الجمهورية الجزائرية الديمقراطية الشعبية
- Adjectival(s): Algerian
- Demonym(s): Algerian(s)
- Etymology: Name of Algeria
- International rankings of Algeria
- ISO country codes: DZ, DZA, 012
- ISO region codes: See ISO 3166-2:DZ
- Internet country code top-level domain: .dz

== Geography of Algeria ==
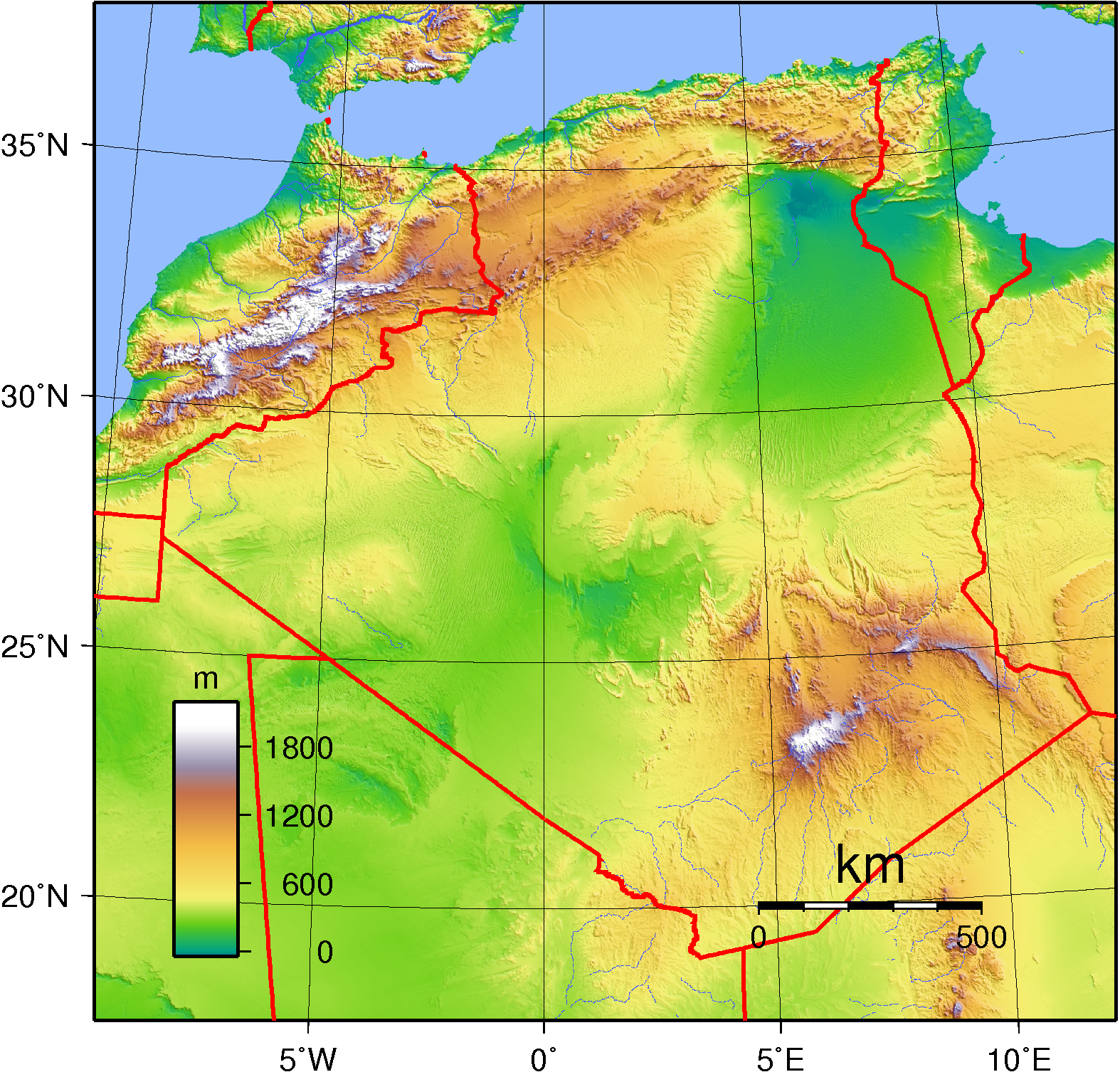
An enlargeable topographic map of Algeria

Geography of Algeria

- Algeria is: a country
- Population of Algeria: 45,400,000 people (2022 estimate) - 33rd most populous country
- Area of Algeria: 2,381,741 km^{2} (919,595 sq mi) - 10th largest country
  - List of Algerian provinces by area
- Atlas of Algeria

=== Location ===
- Algeria is situated within the following regions:
  - Northern Hemisphere and lies on the Prime Meridian
    - Africa
      - Sahara Desert
      - North Africa
        - Maghreb
  - West Africa
- Time zone: West Africa Time (UTC+01)
- Extreme points of Algeria
  - High: Mount Tahat 3,003 m (9,852 ft)
  - Low: Chott Melrhir −40 m (−131 ft)
- Land boundaries: 6,343 km

Libya 982 km
Tunisia 965 km
Morocco 1,608 km
Western Sahara 41 km
Mauritania 463 km
Mali 1,376 km
Niger 956 km

- Coastline: 998 km

=== Environment of Algeria ===
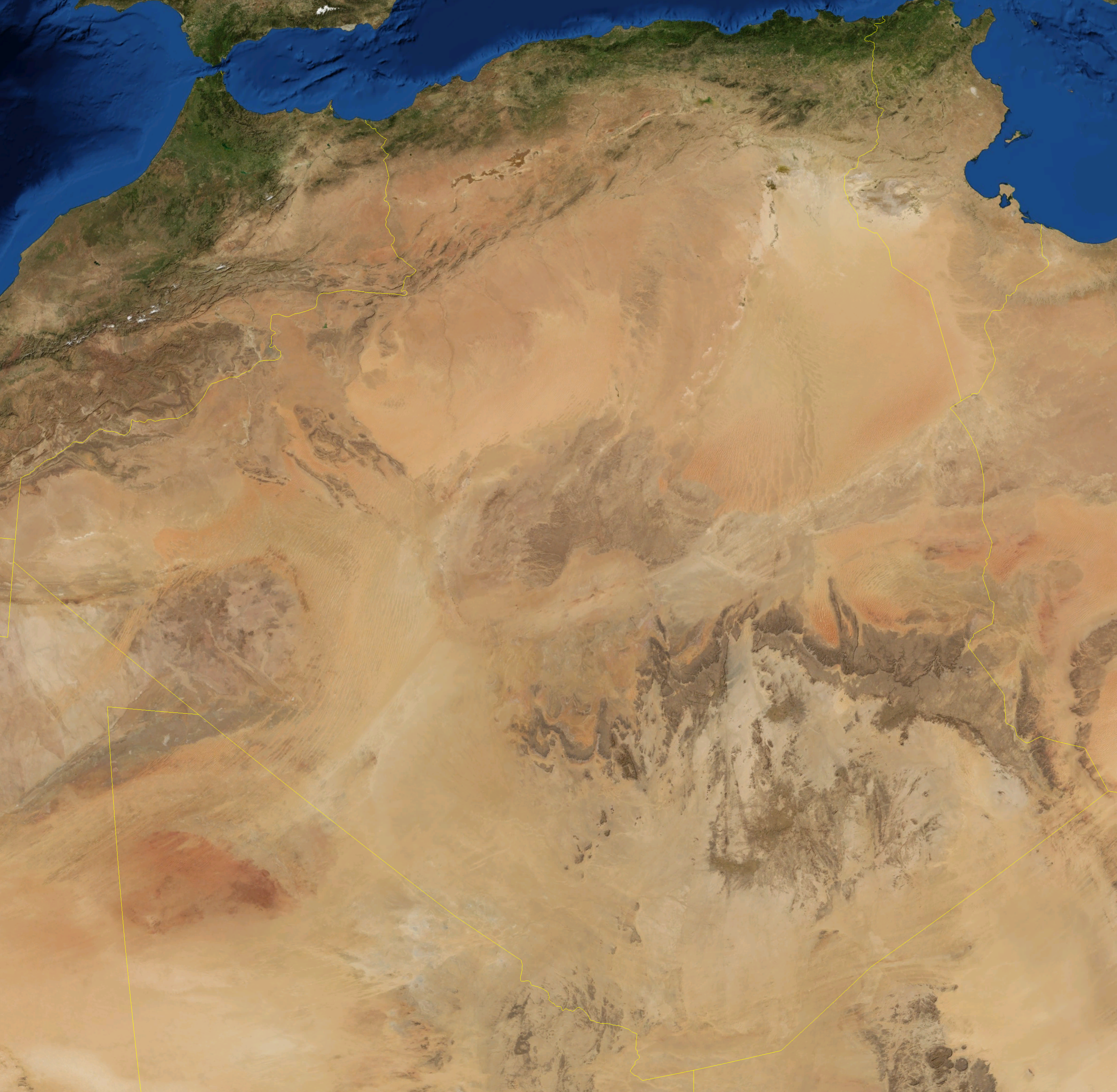
An enlargeable satellite image of Algeria

- Climate of Algeria
- Ecoregions in Algeria
- Earthquakes in Algeria
- Geology of Algeria
- Protected areas of Algeria
  - Biosphere reserves in Algeria
  - National parks of Algeria
- Wildlife of Algeria
  - Fauna of Algeria
    - Birds of Algeria
    - Insects of Algeria
      - Butterflies of Algeria
    - Mammals of Algeria

==== Natural geographic features of Algeria ====
- Glaciers in Algeria: none
- Rivers of Algeria
- World Heritage Sites in Algeria

=== Regions of Algeria ===
==== Ecoregions of Algeria ====
List of ecoregions in Algeria

==== Administrative divisions of Algeria ====
- Provinces of Algeria
  - Districts of Algeria
    - Communes of Algeria

A map of Algeria with province borderlines.

- List of Algerian provinces by area
- List of Algerian provinces by population
- Alphabetical list of provinces
  - Adrar
  - Aïn Defla
  - Aïn Témouchent
  - Algiers
  - Annaba
  - Batna
  - Béchar
  - Béjaïa
  - Biskra
  - Blida
  - Bordj Bou Arréridj
  - Bouira
  - Boumerdès
  - Chlef
  - Constantine
  - Djelfa
  - El Bayadh
  - El Oued
  - El Tarf
  - Ghardaïa
  - Guelma
  - Illizi
  - Jijel
  - Khenchela
  - Laghouat
  - M'Sila
  - Mascara
  - Médéa
  - Mila
  - Mostaganem
  - Naama
  - Oran
  - Ouargla
  - Oum el-Bouaghi
  - Relizane
  - Saida
  - Sétif
  - Sidi Bel Abbes
  - Skikda
  - Souk Ahras
  - Tamanghasset
  - Tébessa
  - Tiaret
  - Tindouf
  - Tipasa
  - Tissemsilt
  - Tizi Ouzou
  - Tlemcen

The Djemila Roman Theater

The provinces of Algeria are divided into 553 districts (daïras)

The districts of Algeria are divided into 1,541 municipalities.

- Cities of Algeria
  - Capital of Algeria: Algiers

=== Demography of Algeria ===
Demographics of Algeria

== Government and politics of Algeria ==
Politics of Algeria

- Form of government: presidential republic
- Capital of Algeria: Algiers
- Elections in Algeria
- Political parties in Algeria
- Taxation in Algeria

=== Branches of the government of Algeria ===
Government of Algeria

==== Executive branch of the government of Algeria ====
- Head of state: President of Algeria, Abdelmadjid Tebboune
- Head of government: Prime Minister of Algeria, Sifi Ghrieb
- Council of Ministers of Algeria

==== Legislative branch of the government of Algeria ====
- Parliament of Algeria (bicameral)
  - Upper house: Council of the Nation
  - Lower house: People's National Assembly

==== Judicial branch of the government of Algeria ====
Court system of Algeria

=== Foreign relations of Algeria ===
Foreign relations of Algeria

- Diplomatic missions in Algeria
- Diplomatic missions of Algeria
- Algeria–Japan relations
- Algeria–Libya relations
- Embassy of Algeria in Washington, D.C.
- Embassy of Algeria, Kyiv
- Embassy of Algeria, London
- Embassy of Algeria, Ottawa
- Visa policy of Algeria

==== International organization membership ====
The People's Democratic Republic of Algeria is a member of:

- African Development Bank Group (AfDB)
- African Union (AU)
- Arab Bank for Economic Development in Africa (ABEDA)
- Arab Fund for Economic and Social Development (AFESD)
- Arab Maghreb Union (AMU)
- Arab Monetary Fund (AMF)
- African Petroleum Producers Organization (APPO)
- Bank for International Settlements (BIS)
- Food and Agriculture Organization (FAO)
- Group of 15 (G15)
- Group of 24 (G24)
- Group of 77 (G77)
- International Atomic Energy Agency (IAEA)
- International Bank for Reconstruction and Development (IBRD)
- International Chamber of Commerce (ICC)
- International Civil Aviation Organization (ICAO)
- International Criminal Court (ICCt) (signatory)
- International Criminal Police Organization (Interpol)
- International Development Association (IDA)
- International Federation of Red Cross and Red Crescent Societies (IFRCS)
- International Finance Corporation (IFC)
- International Fund for Agricultural Development (IFAD)
- International Hydrographic Organization (IHO)
- International Labour Organization (ILO)
- International Maritime Organization (IMO)
- International Mobile Satellite Organization (IMSO)
- International Monetary Fund (IMF)
- International Olympic Committee (IOC)
- International Organization for Migration (IOM)
- International Organization for Standardization (ISO)
- International Red Cross and Red Crescent Movement (ICRM)
- International Telecommunication Union (ITU)
- International Telecommunications Satellite Organization (ITSO)
- International Trade Union Confederation (ITUC)
- Inter-Parliamentary Union (IPU)
- Islamic Development Bank (IDB)
- League of Arab States (LAS)
- Multilateral Investment Guarantee Agency (MIGA)
- Nonaligned Movement (NAM)
- Organisation of Islamic Cooperation (OIC)
- Organization for Security and Cooperation in Europe (OSCE) (partner)
- Organisation for the Prohibition of Chemical Weapons (OPCW)
- Organization of American States (OAS) (observer)
- Organization of Arab Petroleum Exporting Countries (OAPEC)
- Organization of Petroleum Exporting Countries (OPEC)
- United Nations (UN)
- United Nations Conference on Trade and Development (UNCTAD)
- United Nations Educational, Scientific, and Cultural Organization (UNESCO)
- United Nations High Commissioner for Refugees (UNHCR)
- United Nations Industrial Development Organization (UNIDO)
- United Nations Institute for Training and Research (UNITAR)
- United Nations Organization Mission in the Democratic Republic of the Congo (MONUC)
- Universal Postal Union (UPU)
- World Customs Organization (WCO)
- World Federation of Trade Unions (WFTU)
- World Health Organization (WHO)
- World Intellectual Property Organization (WIPO)
- World Meteorological Organization (WMO)
- World Tourism Organization (UNWTO)
- World Trade Organization (WTO) (observer)

=== Law and order in Algeria ===
Law in Algeria

- Constitution of Algeria
- Crime in Algeria
  - Human trafficking in Algeria
- Human rights in Algeria
  - Censorship in Algeria
  - Blasphemy law in Algeria
  - LGBT rights in Algeria
  - Freedom of religion in Algeria
  - Polygamy in Algeria
  - Disability in Algeria
  - Women in Algeria
- Law enforcement in Algeria
  - List of Algerian prisons
- Visa policy of Algeria

=== Military of Algeria ===
Military of Algeria

- Command
  - Commander-in-chief: President of Algeria
- Forces
  - Army of Algeria
  - Navy of Algeria
  - Air Force of Algeria
  - Territorial Air Defence Forces of Algeria
  - Gendarmerie Nationale
  - Republican Guard
  - Algeria and weapons of mass destruction
- Military history of Algeria
- Defense industry of Algeria

== History of Algeria ==
History of Algeria

- Archaeology in Algeria

=== By period ===
- Prehistoric North Africa
- North Africa during classical antiquity
- Medieval Muslim Algeria
- Regency of Algiers (1516–1830)
- French Algeria (1830–1962)
  - Algerian popular resistance against French invasion (1830–1903)
  - Algerian War (1954–1962)
- History of Algeria (1962–1999)
- Algerian Civil War (1991–2002)
- 2000s in Algeria

=== By subject ===
- Conflicts in Algeria
- Earthquakes in Algeria
- History of the Jews in Algeria
- Massacres in Algeria
- Military history of Algeria

== Culture of Algeria ==
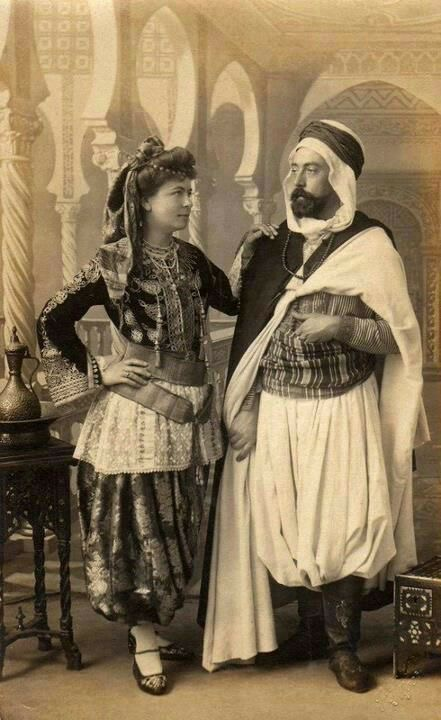
Algerian traditional clothing

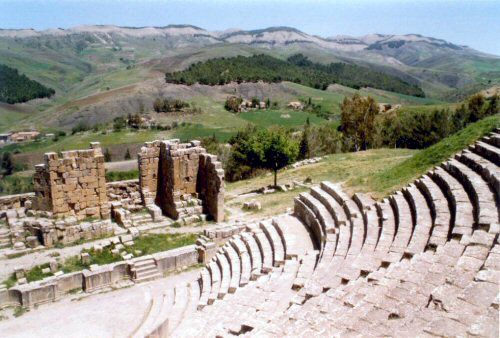
Djemila Roman Theater

Culture of Algeria

- Architecture of Algeria
  - Tallest structures in Algeria
- Cuisine of Algeria
- Languages of Algeria
- Media in Algeria
- Museums in Algeria
- National symbols of Algeria
  - Coat of arms of Algeria
  - Flag of Algeria
  - National anthem of Algeria
- People of Algeria
  - Algerian people
    - Specific Algerians
      - Algerian writers
    - Women in Algeria
  - Ethnic groups in Algeria
    - Chinese people in Algeria
    - Europeans in Algeria
- Public holidays in Algeria
- Scouting and Guiding in Algeria
- World Heritage Sites in Algeria

=== Art in Algeria ===
- Cinema of Algeria
  - List of Algerian films
  - List of Algerian submissions for the Academy Award for Best Foreign Language Film
- Literature of Algeria
  - DZ-manga
- Music of Algeria
- Television in Algeria

=== Religion in Algeria ===
- Religion in Algeria
  - Bahá'í Faith in Algeria
  - Christianity in Algeria
    - Protestantism in Algeria
      - Protestant Church of Algeria
    - Roman Catholicism in Algeria
      - Catholic churches in Algeria
  - Hinduism in Algeria
  - Islam in Algeria
    - Mosques in Algeria
    - Shia Islam in Algeria
  - Judaism in Algeria
    - History of the Jews in Algeria

=== Sports in Algeria ===
Sports in Algeria

- Football in Algeria
  - Football clubs in Algeria
- Algeria at the Olympics
- Rugby union in Algeria
- List of Algerian records in swimming

== Economy and infrastructure of Algeria ==
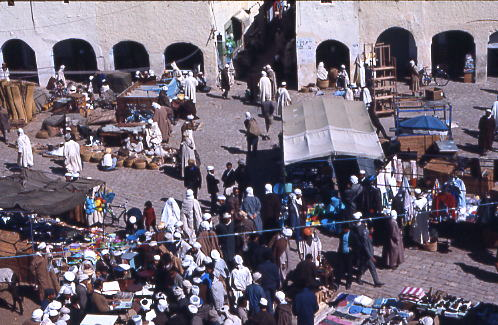
Local market in Ghardaïa (1971).

Economy of Algeria

- Economic rank, by nominal GDP (2007): 50th (fiftieth)
- Agriculture in Algeria
- Banking in Algeria
  - Banks in Algeria
- Communications in Algeria
  - Media of Algeria
    - Newspapers in Algeria
  - Telecommunications in Algeria
    - Telephone numbers in Algeria
    - Internet in Algeria
- Companies of Algeria
- Currency of Algeria: Dinar
  - ISO 4217: DZD
- Defense industry of Algeria
- Energy in Algeria
  - Nuclear energy in Algeria
  - Power stations in Algeria
  - Renewable energy in Algeria
- Health care in Algeria
  - Health in Algeria
- Mining in Algeria
- Retail sector in Algeria
  - Shopping malls in Algeria
  - Supermarket chains in Algeria
- Tourism in Algeria
- Visa policy of Algeria
- Trade unions in Algeria
- Transport in Algeria
  - Air transport in Algeria
    - Airlines of Algeria
    - Airports in Algeria
      - Busiest airports in Algeria
  - Rail transport in Algeria
  - Shipping in Algeria
    - List of Algerian ships
- Water supply and sanitation in Algeria
  - Water privatization in Algeria

== Education in Algeria ==
Education in Algeria

- National Library of Algeria
- Museums in Algeria
- Universities in Algeria

== See also ==
Algeria

- List of Algeria-related topics
- List of international rankings
- Member state of the United Nations
- Outline of Africa
- Outline of geography
