= List of companies of Algeria =

Location of Algeria

Algeria is a sovereign state in North Africa on the Mediterranean coast.

Algeria is classified as an upper middle income country by the World Bank. Algeria's currency is the dinar (DZD). The economy remains dominated by the state, a legacy of the country's socialist post-independence development model. In recent years, the Algerian government has halted the privatization of state-owned industries and imposed restrictions on imports and foreign involvement in its economy.

== Notable firms ==
This list includes notable companies with primary headquarters located in the country. The industry and sector follow the Industry Classification Benchmark taxonomy. Organizations which have ceased operations are included and noted as defunct.

Notable companies Status: P=Private, S=State; A=Active, D=Defunct
Name	Industry	Sector	Headquarters	Founded	Notes	Status	
Air Algérie	Consumer services	Airlines	Algiers	1947	Flag carrier airline	S	A
Air Express Algeria	Industrials	Delivery services	Hassi Messaoud	2002	Private, cargo delivery	P	A
Algérie Ferries	Industrials	Marine transportation	Algiers	1987	State-owned, marine transportation	S	A
Algérie Poste	Consumer services	Delivery services	Algiers	1913	State-owned, postal services	S	A
Algérie Télécom	Telecommunications	Mobile Telecommunications	Algiers	2003	State-owned mobile Telecommunications	S	A
Antinea Airlines	Consumer services	Airlines	Algiers	1999	Private airline, defunct 2003	P	D
Asmidal	Basic materials	Specialty chemicals	Annaba	1984	State-owned, chemical products	S	A
Cevital	Consumer goods	Food products	Béjaïa	1998	Private retail and food conglomerate	P	A
Djezzy	Telecommunications	Mobile Telecommunications	Algiers	2001	Private mobile Telecommunications	P	A
Echorouk TV	Consumer services	Broadcasting & entertainment	Algiers	2011	Private, broadcasting & entertainment	P	A
El Khabar	Consumer services	Publishing	Algiers	1990	Private publisher, daily newspaper	P	A
El Watan	Consumer services	Publishing	Algiers	1991	Private publisher, daily newspaper	P	A
Entreprise nationale de Radiodiffusion sonore (ENRS)	Consumer services	Broadcasting & entertainment	Algiers	1986	State-owned radio broadcaster	S	A
Hamoud Boualem	Consumer goods	Soft drinks	Algiers	1878	Soft drinks	P	A
Khalifa Airways	Consumer services	Airlines	Algiers	1999	Private airline, defunct 2003	P	D
Naftal	Oil & gas	Oil equipment, services & distribution	Algiers	1981	State-owned, fuel retail	S	A
National Company for Rail Transport (SNTF)	Industrials	Railroads	Algiers	1976	State-owned railroads	S	A
Ooredoo Algeria	Telecommunications	Mobile Telecommunications	Algiers	2004	Private mobile Telecommunications	P	A
Public Establishment of Television (EPTV)	Consumer services	Broadcasting & entertainment	Algiers	1962	State-owned broadcaster	S	A
Saidal	Health care	Pharmaceuticals	Annaba	1984	State-owned pharma	S	A
SNVI	Industrials	Commercial vehicles & trucks	Rouïba	1967	State-owned commercial vehicles, trucks	S	A
Sonatrach	Oil & gas	Exploration & production	Algiers	1963	State-owned oil & gas	S	A
Sonelgaz	Utilities	Conventional electricity	Algiers	1969	State-owned utility	S	A
Star Aviation	Consumer services	Airlines	Hassi Messaoud	2001	Private airline	P	A
Tassili Airlines	Consumer services	Airlines	Algiers	1998	State-owned airline	S	A

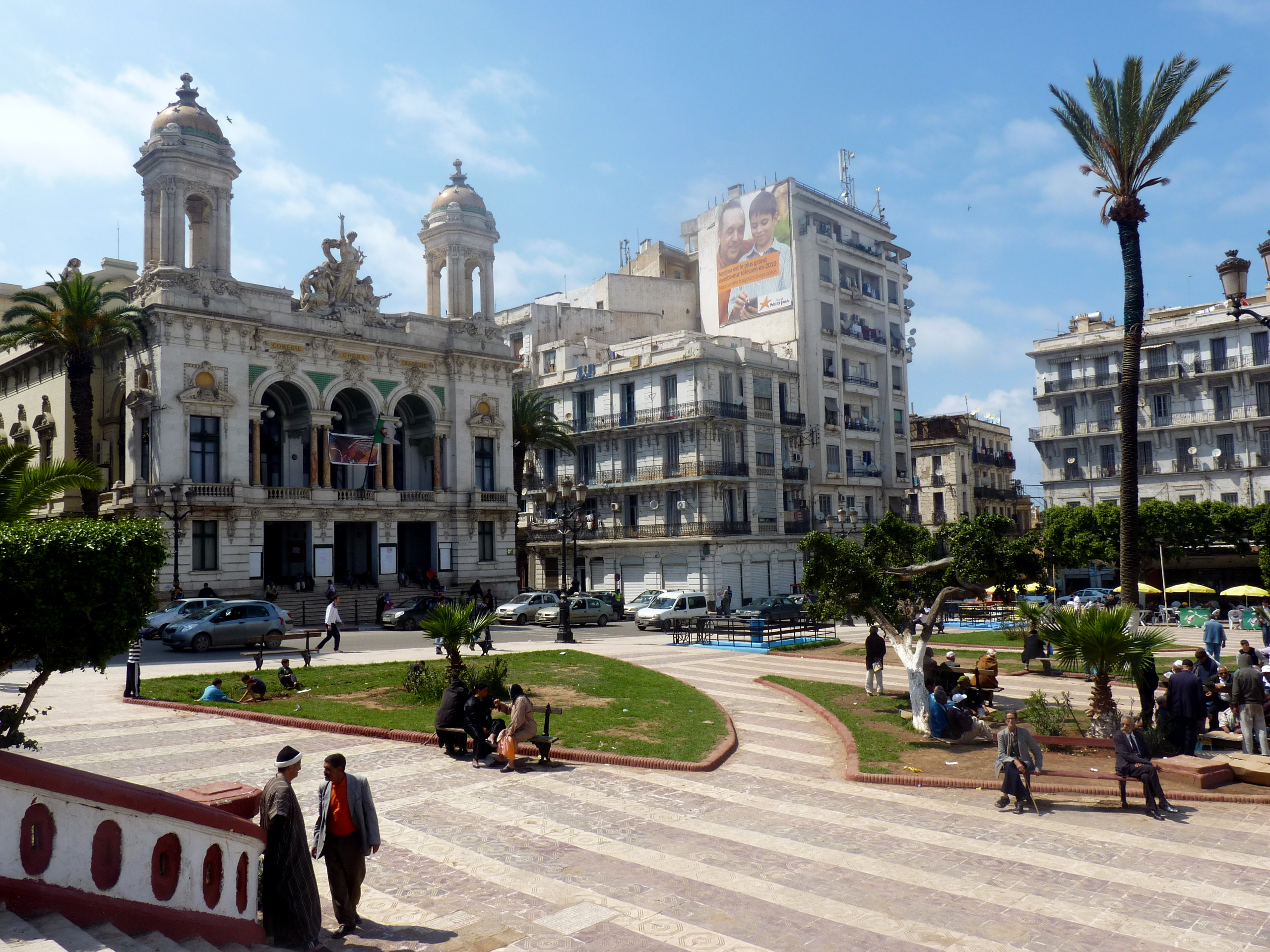
The port city of Oran.

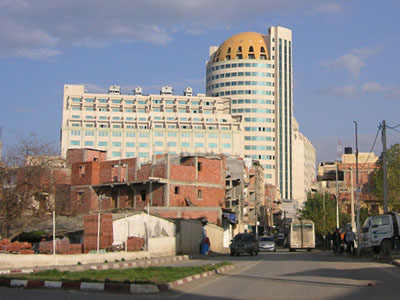
"Centre Commercial Al Qods" in Algiers.

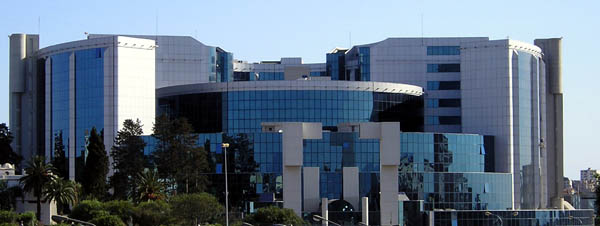
Ministry of Finance of Algeria.

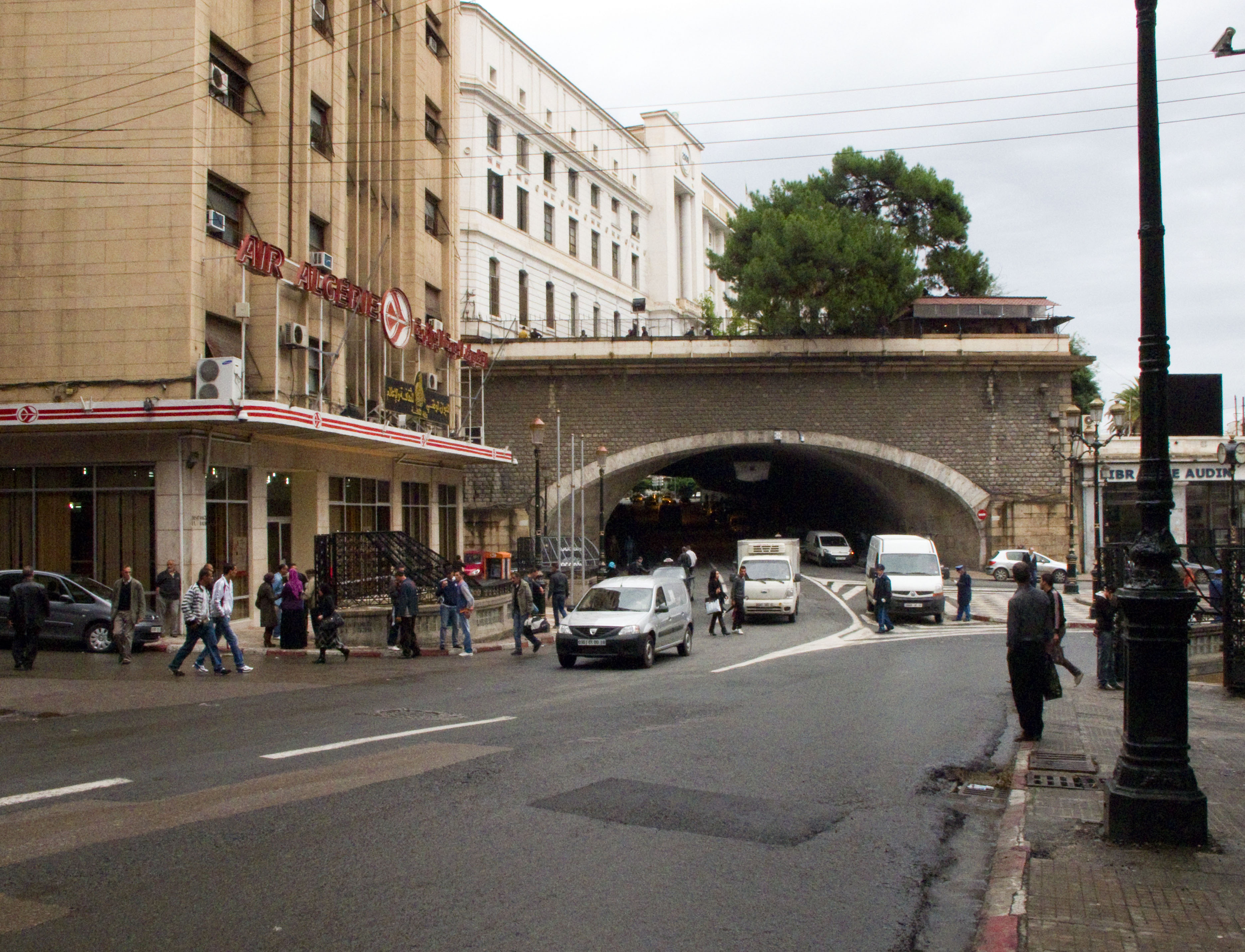
Air Algérie head office in Place Audin.
