= Hamida Ayashi =

Algerian writer, journalist, translator and playwright

Hamida Ayachi
- Born: 1958 (age 67–68); Makdra, Algeria
- Other name: Hmadya Ayashi
- Occupation: Journalist

Hamida Ayachi (born 1958) is an Algerian writer, journalist, translator and playwright, He has several novels, theatrical works and political writings. He worked as an editor-in-chief for newspapers that were closed by the authorities, such as Al-Massar Maghreb and Algeria News. Today, he works as an advisor to the Algerian Minister of Culture.

== Early life and education ==
He was born in 1958 in Makdra, near Sidi Bel Abbès. He studied political science in Algiers.

== His literary and theatrical works ==
At the age of seventeen, he collaborated with Kateb Yacine, who was appointed director of the regional theater in Sidi Bel Abbes, and met him again after moving to study in the capital, where he lived with him for several years and acted and translated some of his plays into Arabic, and later influenced him in his theatrical and novel writings. In 1988, he published his first novel, Memory of Madness and Suicide, which was considered at the time to break the prevailing pattern in the Algerian novel at the time, in terms of employing psychologically oriented techniques and mixing realism and surrealism, a trend that continued in his second novel, Obsession, which was published in 2007. He published in 2008 on the episodes of the novel "Angels and Demons", which led to a crisis with the French embassy in Algeria, which demanded the writer to apologize for mentioning the names of its employees in the novel and its chargé d'affaires threatened to take action against the writer, which sparked a wide campaign of solidarity with Al-Ayachi on the part of writers, journalists and trade unionists Algerians. In 2010, he released his third novel, Labyrinths, which dealt with the years of the civil war in Algeria in the nineties.

He wrote and acted in a number of monologues, the most famous of which is "Al-Qurain 1962", and in 2017, he published his autobiography from 1965 to 1985 in the book "Letter to a Princess".

== In the press and media ==
He has worked in the press since 1988, and in 1989, he contributed to the publication of the left-wing newspaper "Algeria Al-Jahhouri", which the authorities have banned since 1965. In 1990, he headed the editor of the Arabic version of the weekly "Al Masar Al Maghreb" until the authorities banned it after the military coup in January 1992. In his writings, he dealt with the Islamic movement and published his book "Islamists between Power and Bullets", which was confiscated by the authorities in the year of the coup. And in 2014 he published in Arabic and French his book "The Years of Chadli Bin Jadid," which chronicles through dialogues with personalities who were active in the political scene during the period of Chadli Bin Jadid's rule (1987–1992), and identifies the hidden conflicts within the ruling establishment at the time.

He also wrote a series of articles on the cultural issue about the Rai song as a lyrical heritage that was marginalized by the political authority at the time, and conducted the first press interview with Cheb Khaled, who was barely twenty at the time.

He founded and participated in a number of national newspapers calling for national reconciliation, including "Algeria News", which was closed by the authorities in 2014 for financial reasons, according to the position of the government presses administration, and for political reasons, according to Ayachi.

He worked for Al-Khobar newspaper, then moved from it to Al-Hayat newspaper and then its TV channel, and resigned from it in November 2019.

== Political sites ==
In the Algerian presidential elections of 2019, Ayachi took over the Public Relations Department of candidate Ali Ghadiri's electoral campaign. In January 2020, he was appointed as an advisor to the Algerian Minister of Culture, Malika Boudouda, to help with reforms related to the Algerian cultural scene.

== His writing ==
- Memory of Madness and Suicide (novel), Lavomique Publications, Algeria, 1986
- Islamists between power and bullets, Dar Al-Hikma, Algeria 1991
- The years of Chadli bin Jadid, 2014
- Cain and Cain (play), 1998
- Obsession (novel), Chehab Publications, Algeria, 2007
- The Labyrinths of the Night of Sedition (novel), Isthmus Publications, Algeria 2010, ISBN 978-9961-892-09-1
- Angels and Demons (serial novel), published in episodes in Algiers News, and in French in Algerie News, 2008
- The Prophet of Disobedience – 10 years with Kateb Yacine, Socrates, Algeria, 2011
- Consort 1962 (play), 2012
- Letters to Amira – Fragmented Biographical Facts, Al-Hayat Publications, Algeria, 2017
