= List of defunct airlines of Algeria =

This is a list of defunct airlines of Algeria.

Airline	Image	IATA	ICAO	Callsign	Commenced operations	Ceased operations	Notes
Aéro-Africaine					1945	1963	Air transport division of Société Algérienne des Transports Tropicaux and later of Société Africaine des Transports Tropicaux. Operated Douglas DC-3, Lockheed Lodestar
Aérotechnique Alger-Duclos				AEROTEC	1948	1962	
Afric Air					1964	1969	Operated Douglas C-47
Air Afrique					1937	1941	
Antinea Airlines		HO	DJA	ANTINEA	1999	2003	
Compagnie Air Transport					1946	1953	Subsidiary of Air France. Merged with Société Algerienne de Constructions Aeronautiques to form Air Algérie
Compagnie Algérienne de Transports Aériens					1946	1950	
Compagnie Chérifienne du Pont Aérien					1954	1955	
Compagnie Générale de Transports Aériens-Air Algérie					1953	1962	To Air Algérie
Compagnie générale transsaharienne				CGT	1946	1950	Merged to Compagnie Air Transport
Compagnie Transafricaine d’Aviation					1929	1935	Absorbed by Regie Air Afrique
Ecoair International		9H	DEI		1998	2002	
Germain					1934	1938	
Inter Air Services		RI			1984	1987	Subsidiary of Air Algérie. Operated Fokker F27
Khalifa Airways		K6	KZW	KHALIFA AIR	1999	2003	
North African Airways					1980	1989	
Regie Air Afrique					1934	1937	Operated Bloch MB.120
Rym Airlines					2003	2005	
Sahara Airlines		6S	SHD		1998	2003	
Société Aero Sahara					1950	1968	Operated Beech Bonanza, Cessna 185, Cessna 310, Piper Tri-Pacer
Société Africaine des Transports Tropicaux					1933	1952	
Société Algerienne de Constructions Aeronautiques					1947	1953	Merged with Compagnie Air Transport to form Air Algérie
Société de Travail Aérien					1968	1972	
Société Generale d’Afflretements Aériens					1955	1964	Founded by Roger Colin. Became part of Air Fret
Société Nationale de Transport et Travail Aérien					?	?	
Société Transafricaine d'Aviation					1952	1953	
Société Transatlantique Aérienne					1927	1954	Founded by John Dal Piaz. Operated Douglas DC-3
Transsaharienne					1935	1942	

== See also ==
- List of airlines of Algeria
- List of airports in Algeria
