= Ecoair International =

Airline of Algeria

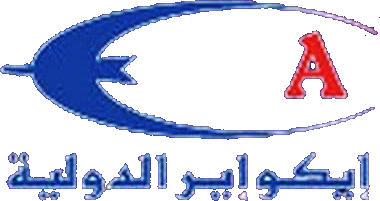
IATA	ICAO	Call sign
9H	DEI	—
- Commenced operations: 1999
- Ceased operations: 2002
- Operating bases: Houari Boumedienne Airport, Algeria
- Destinations: Brussels South Charleroi Airport, Belgium
- Parent company: Khalifa Group
- Headquarters: Algiers, Algeria

Ecoair International was an airline based in Algiers, Algeria, founded in 1999. In 2002 it was integrated into Khalifa Group, the parent company of Khalifa Airways. Operating out of Houari Boumedienne Airport, Ecoair International provided flights to Europe, including Brussels-Charleroi and North Africa, and within Algeria.

== Code data ==
- IATA Code: 9H
- ICAO Code: DEI

== History ==
Ecoair International was established in 1999 and started operations with the help of Khalifa Airways and the Khalifa Group.

== Fleet ==
Until its bankruptcy, the airline had 6 Boeing 737 Classic, all are leased from various airlines, including:

- 4 Boeing 737-200.
- 1 Boeing 737-300.
- 1 Boeing 737-400.

== See also ==
- List of defunct airlines of Algeria
