= Algeria and weapons of mass destruction =

The Algerian nuclear program was launched in 1981, initially with the cooperation of Argentina, then with China. Algeria has since denied developing a military nuclear program, having signed the treaty of non-proliferation of nuclear weapons in 1995. However, some sources such as the National Intelligence Centre of Spain estimate in 1998 that "Algeria had the intention to produce enriched Plutonium for military purposes, a material capable of producing a nuclear weapon."

In 1991, the government of the United States said it had unearthed details of the alleged construction of a nuclear reactor in Algeria. The Washington Times accused the country of developing nuclear weapons with the help of the Chinese government. The Algerian government admitted it was building a reactor but denied any secrecy or military purpose. Surveillance from U.S. satellites also suggested that the reactor would not be used for military purposes.

In November 1991, Algeria placed the reactor under IAEA safeguards. Algeria signed the Nuclear Non-Proliferation Treaty in January 1995, and ratified the Chemical Weapons Convention In August 2001, Algeria acceded to the Biological Weapons Convention. Algeria signed the Treaty on the Prohibition of Nuclear Weapons on 20 September 2017, but has not ratified it as of August 2022.

== History ==
=== Aïn Oussara nuclear reactor ===
In 1983, the Algerian People's National Army signed an agreement with the People's Republic of China for the provision of a nuclear reactor of 15 thermal megawatts, named Es-Salam ("peace"), that was fabricated in the 1980s in the site of Aïn Oussera. The reactor uses the heavy water as a moderator fluid, easily diverged for military use: it could allow the transformation from natural uranium, to produce in only one year enough plutonium of the quality necessary for a bomb. The Algerian reactor was not discovered until 1991 by a reconnaissance satellite of the US Air Force.

=== Draria nuclear reactor ===
Accordingly, in 1989, Algeria acquired the NUR (Nuclear Uranium Reactor) light-water reactor fueled with uranium enriched to 20% with a power level of one megawatt thermal, monitored by the International atomic Energy Agency and which, according to it, does not involve a risk of proliferation. A little after an article published by Washington Times, US Air Force reconnaissance satellites flew over the Aïn Oussera site, leading to controversy in the intelligence community over the use, military or not, of the site. However, in retrospect, it is obvious that these articles were published for propaganda purposes: in fact, dates are regularly given for Algeria to obtain nuclear weapons. These announcement effects have never been based on scientific foundations and many deadlines have been missed without Algeria having produced nuclear weapons, nor the IAEA having ever had to announce his slightest doubt.

== Electricity production ==
In 2008, Algeria hopes to build a Nuclear Power Plant to produce electricity, Algeria thus sought to examine a cooperation with France, USA and Russia. Until 2022, no nuclear power plant is yet declared to be built.

== See also ==
- Energy in Algeria
- Reggane series
- NUR Reactor
- Aïn Oussara nuclear Reactor
- Treaty on the Non Proliferation
- Comprehensive Nuclear-Test-Ban Treaty
