= Star Aviation Amel =

Amel

General information
- Type: Remote piloted aircraft, unmanned aerial vehicle
- Manufacturer: Star Aviation
- Designer: Star Aviation

History
- Manufactured: 2013–present
- First flight: 2013

Amel is an Algerian design of drone operating since October 2013.

== Variants ==
=== AMEL 300-3 ===
AMEL 300-3 an Algeria design of drone operating since October 2016. It is manufactured by the Center Industrial research and Technology (Algeria) Balhrach (CRTI) and is composed of fiberglass and carbon for durability and low weight. It can not be detected by radar reconnaissance. The UAV contains an electric motor and two surveillance cameras and provides live images.

=== AMEL 400-1 ===
Amel 400-1 is an Algerian design of drone operating since October 2013.

=== AMEL 700-2 ===
Amel 700-2 is an Algerian design of drone operating since October 2016.

== See also ==
- Al Fajer L-10
