= Muslim militia =

Muslim militia may refer to:

- any Islamic militia in general

== Balkans ==
- Sandžak Muslim militia in Yugoslavia during World War II
- Hadžiefendić Legion during World War II
- Militia of Husein Miljković during World War II

== Indonesia ==
- Darul Islam (Indonesia)

== Middle East ==
- Shi'ite Amal militia in the War of the Camps
- Lebanese Civil War (section Political groups and militias)
- South Lebanon conflict (1985–2000)

== South Asia ==
- Razakars militia of Kasim Razvi in the princely state of Hyderabad
- Militia of Ismatullah Muslim in Afghanistan
- The mujahideen in Afghanistan during the Soviet-Afghan war

== Africa ==
- Pro-French Harki militia in the Military history of Algeria
- Militias in the Central African Republic conflict (2012–present)

== Caucasus ==
- Militias in the Armenian–Azerbaijani War
