= El Fadjr L-10 =

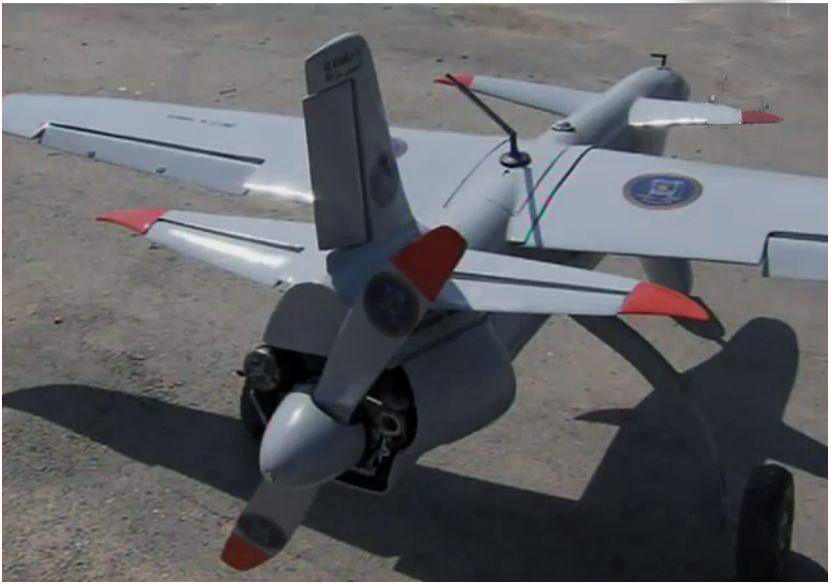
- The El Fadjr L-10

General information
- Type: HALE UAV
- Manufacturer: Start Aviation
- Designer: Start Aviation
- Status: In service
- Primary user: Algerian Air Force

History
- Manufactured: 2013–present
- First flight: 2013

The El Fadjr L-1 (Arabic: الفَجر English: "Dawn") is an unmanned aerial vehicle developed by Star Aviation to serve both military and civilian purposes. It can fly at up to 7,000 m (23,000 ft) altitude with an endurance of 36 hours. It has a wingspan of 2.3 m (7 ft 7 in) and can carry a load of 70 kg (150 lb) with a power of 24 kW (32 hp).

== See also ==
- Amel (UAV)
