= RYM =

RYM may refer to:

- Rate Your Music, a music-based website
- Revolutionary Youth Movement, a 20th-century American political movement
- Rym Airlines, former Algerian airline (2003–2005)
- Princess Rym al-Ali (born 1969), Algerian princess
