= SHD (disambiguation) =

SHD may refer to:

- Shenandoah Valley Regional Airport, the IATA code SHD
- Sahara Airlines (Algeria), the ICAO code SHD
- ISO 639:shd, the ISO 639 code for the Kundal Shahi language
- Defence Historical Service (French: Service historique de la défense), the archives centre of Ministry of Defence and its armed forces
- Sandhoff disease, a lysosomal genetic, lipid storage disorder
