= Es-Salam nuclear reactor =

Algerian nuclear reactor

Coordinates: 35.63°N 3.22°E

Es-Salam research reactor
- Location within Algeria
- Operating institution: Centre de Recherche Nucléaire de Birine (CRNB)
- Location: Birine, Algeria
- Type: Heavy water reactor
- Power: 15 MWt

Construction and upkeep
- Construction began: 1988-01-01
- First criticality: 1992-02-17

Technical specifications
- Cooling: Heavy water
- Neutron moderator: Heavy water
- Neutron reflector: Graphite

The Es-Salam research reactor, also known as the Aïn Oussara nuclear reactor, is a nuclear research reactor in Algeria. The reactor can produce 15 megawatts-thermal and its primary uses are radiopharmaceutical production, neutron activation analysis, neutron radiography, and training. The reactor was supplied by China and built in the region of Aïn Oussera, nearly due south of the capital city of Algiers. It reached criticality in February 1992 and began operation in late 1993.

Es-Salam is a heavy-water reactor that uses low enriched uranium, with 3% enriched uranium oxide fuel. In the early 1990s, there was fear among American intelligence agencies that the reactor could be used for nuclear proliferation, in part due to its location near a Soviet-supplied surface-to-air missile battery and the fact that the country had not yet ratified the Treaty on the Non-Proliferation of Nuclear Weapons (NPT). At the time, the Algerian Ambassador to the United States, Abderrahmane Bensid, called the reactor's protections "normal, not extraordinary". Information leaked from the CIA alleged that the reactor could be used for military purposes, and that the reactor could produce enough plutonium to produce a nuclear weapon within a year or two.

In 1992, Algeria allowed International Atomic Energy Agency (IAEA) the ability to inspect the reactor, and the country eventually ratified the NPT in 1995 as a non-nuclear weapons State. Algeria is also party to the Pelindaba treaty, which establishes a nuclear-weapon-free zone across the African continent.

In 2019, the reactor was upgraded by the China National Nuclear Corporation (CNNC) to modernize equipment and extend its lifetime.

== See also ==
- Energy in Algeria
- NUR Reactor
- Research reactor
- List of nuclear research reactors
- Nuclear power in China
