= List of supermarket chains in Algeria =

This is a list of supermarket chains in Algeria.

The Algerian chain Ardis (owned by Algerian group Arcofina) is currently operating one hypermarket in the country in Mohammedia just outside Algiers. In the future Ardis will open 19 hypermarkets in the country, the next hypermarket will open near Oran in Bir El Djir. Carrefour ended their partnership with the Algerian group Arcofina on February 19, 2009. "The concept of mass distribution does not work in Algeria," added Carrefour. Before that, Carrefour had still only one store opened as of 2009, of 18 hypermarkets planned by 2012. The private group Arcofina explained that there was a delay because of difficulties in finding available land for hypermarkets. Arcofina is now focusing on opening hypermarkets in the future under the Ardis brand.

== List of current Algerian supermarket chains ==
| Supermarket | Founded/came to Algeria | Owned by | Market share | Sources |
|---|---|---|---|---|
| Ardis | 5 July 2012 | Arcofina | | |
| Centre Commercial | December 2009 | Société des Centres Commerciaux d'Algérie | | |
| Centre Commercial Al Qods | 15 February 2008 | Sidar | | |
| Cevital | | | | |
| Familishop | 2008 | Arcofina | | |
| Kheyar | 1990 | | | |
| Megamart | | | | |
| UNO (Cevital) | | Arcofina | | |
| City Center | | 2015 | | |

== See also ==
- List of supermarket chains in Africa
- List of supermarket chains
- List of hypermarkets in Algeria
