= Asmidal =

- Company type: Public company
- Industry: chemical products
- Founded: 1984; 42 years ago
- Headquarters: Annaba, Algeria
- Products: inorganic products, macromolecular products, synthesys organic products
- Revenue: US$220 million (2006)
- Number of employees: 2,500 (2006)
- Parent: state owned
- Website: http://www.asmidal-dz.com

Asmidal is an Algerian industrial group leader in its field, which manages a portfolio of companies' development, production, and marketing "of fertilizers and pesticides.

== History and profile ==
Asmidal was established in 1984. In 2006, it produced about 2 million tonnes of fertilizer products.

== See also ==
- List of companies of Algeria
