= BCL-M5 =

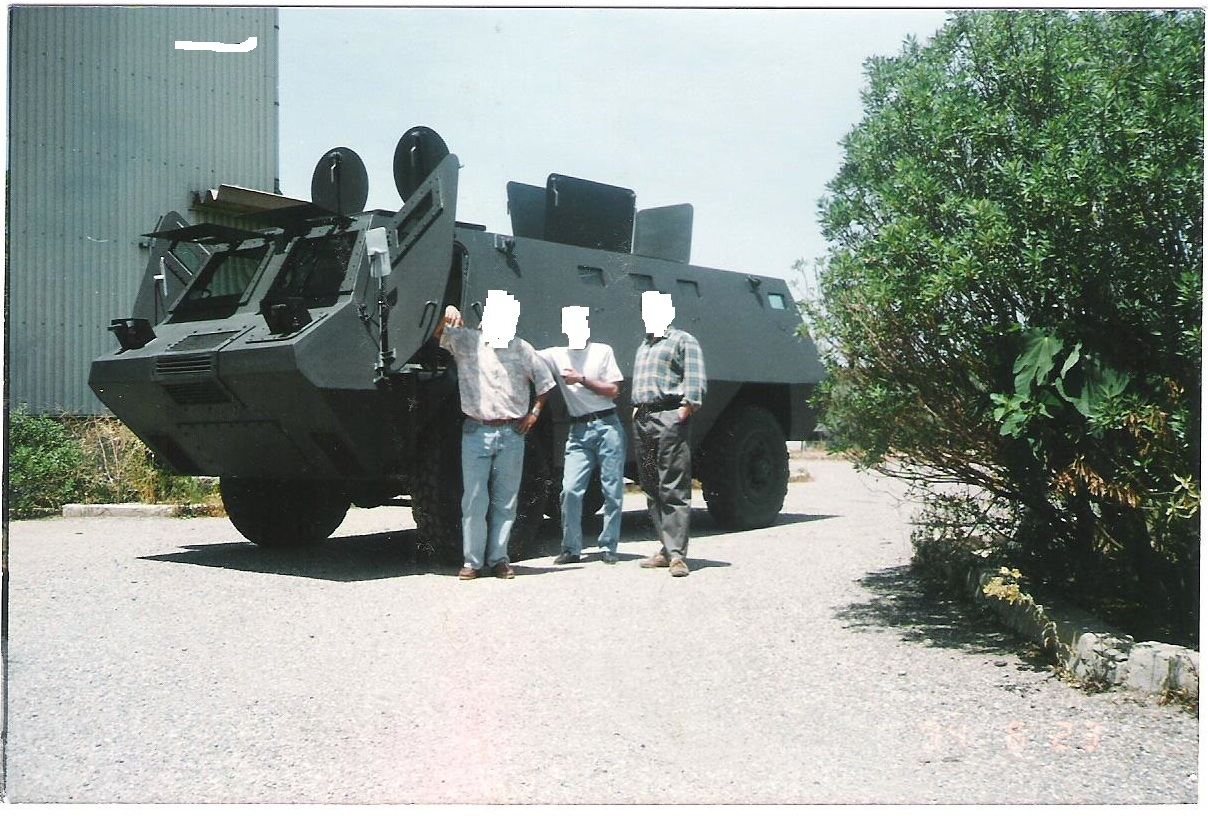
- BCL-M5 at the Central Logistics Base (BCL) of Béni Mered, in the Blida Province
- Type: Armoured personnel carrier
- Place of origin: Algeria

Service history
- In service: 1993–present
- Used by: Algeria; Germany - (License motor)
- Wars: Algerian civil war; Insurgency in the Maghreb

Production history
- Designer: (BCL)
- Designed: 1991
- Manufacturer: (BCL)

Specifications
- Mass: 14,5 tons
- Length: 6,07 m
- Width: 3,60 m
- Height: 2,03 m
- Crew: 2 (8 passengers)
- Main armament: 7.62mm PK machine gun
- Engine: F6L912 KHD Deutz diesel 120 hp
- Suspension: torsion bar
- Operational range: 600 km
- Maximum speed: 65 km/h

The BCL-M5 is an armored personnel carrier manufactured in Algeria by the Central Logistics Base (BCL) of Béni Mered, which is a public industrial and commercial establishment (EPIC) under the Algerian Ministry of Defense. Designed in 1991 and entering service in 1993, it is named after the Central Logistics Base (BCL).

== Features ==
The BCL-M5 armoured vehicle developed by the Central Logistics Base is a four-wheeled armoured vehicle of a shape and size similar to those of the Russian BTRs and can be equipped with a 25mm cannon.

With a 4×4 four-wheel drive system, this armoured vehicle was built on the foundations of a SNVI m120 truck that contains a German F6L912 KHD Deutz engine with a capacity of 120 hp, which is 100% locally manufactured under the license of Deutz, and there are two doors on each side of the vehicle for the driver and the commander of the board, and there are openings on the roof And a small one with small windows on both sides and a total number of 8 for shooting, carrying 8 fully armed personnel + 2 crew members.

The armour of the BCL-M5 is able to protect the occupants of the vehicle against impacts from armour-piercing 7.62mm calibre ammunition, while the front side can withstand impacts from 14.5mm calibre ammunition.

The vehicle also has a "V" floor, providing it with a high level of protection against mines and IEDs (Improvised Explosive Devices). It can withstand the blast of an 8 kg mine, a characteristic that can be further improved, if necessary, by carrying additional armour modules.

== Armament ==
This troop carrier can be fitted with a wide variety of remote-controlled and turret-mounted weapon systems.

Typically, it is paired with a 7.62mm remote-controlled machine gun, paired with a 40mm automatic grenade launcher. However, it can carry weapon systems with a calibre of up to 90mm.

== Operators ==
- Algeria : Used by the People's National Army during the civil war that this country experienced when the major Western powers suspended their arms deliveries.

== See also ==
- Algerian People's National Army
- Defense industry of Algeria
