= Defense industry of Algeria =

Algeria's military industry is a small and slowly emerging military industry.

According to its reputation of having one of the most well-trained militaries in the MENA region, the Algerian army grants importance to the development of its military industry, while giving priority to upgrades and remaining a historically important client for equipment coming from Russia, China, France, South Africa and recently from, Germany, Italy, United Arab Emirates, Turkey and the United States.

== History ==
Algeria is held since 1980 to ensure a degree of autonomy to the National People's Army to avoid increased dependence regarding foreign suppliers. A strategy that had allowed the National People's Army to ensure the supply of weapons when the country was embargoed in the 1990s because European providers erroneously anticipated the takeover by radical Islamists. It allowed even after Great Recession, to avoid bottlenecks

The Algerian industry is still modest and not competitive on a global scale though it permits a certain level of self sufficiency. It provides mainly light military equipment under Russian and Chinese license manufactured in specialized companies under the control of the Directorate of the Department of National Defence. Military equipment are responsible for meeting the priority needs of the National People's Army

Despite the lack of important production for the navy and the air force the National People's Army has also worked in recent years to upgrade the armament acquired and for the construction of its own vessels

== Arms ==
- Khenchela Company of Mechanical Constructions (ECMK) since 1990: produces submachine gun, shotgun, pistol and replacement parts and tooling.
- Seriana Company of industrial achievements (ERIS) since 1991: produces ammunition, replacement parts and tooling, lightning rod, Diesel generator and Shooting range

== Explosives ==
- National Office of Explosive Substances (ONEX) since 1976: produces hunting cartridges, ammunition, hand grenade, anti-tank mines and 12 varieties of explosive materials.

== Vehicles ==
- Central Logistics Base (BCL) of Blida Province: produces Armoured personnel carrier (BCL-M5), Véhicule blindé de combat d'infanterie.
- National Company of Industrial Vehicles (SNVI) of Rouïba: produces combat vehicles, vehicles carrying troops, Trailers Machine carrier, service trucks, means of redress and evacuation, refrigerated trucks, means of import and storage of water as well as fuel, personnel transport vehicles and fire protection trucks.

== Aircraft ==
- Aircraft construction company (ECA) of Tafraoui (Oran): produces Trainer aircraft (Fernas-142), four-seater light aircraft (Safir-43), single seater light aircraft (X-3A). The same company will produce its first Unmanned aerial vehicle 3 meter wingspan and 2.6 m long, HALE type (high altitude, lengthy endurance) which can fly at an altitude of 7,000 meters with a 36 hours battery life.

== Warships ==
- Constructions and Repairs Naval Company (ECRN) in Mers El Kébir (Oran): produces corvettes (Djebel Chenoua-class) and Patrol boats (Kebir Class)
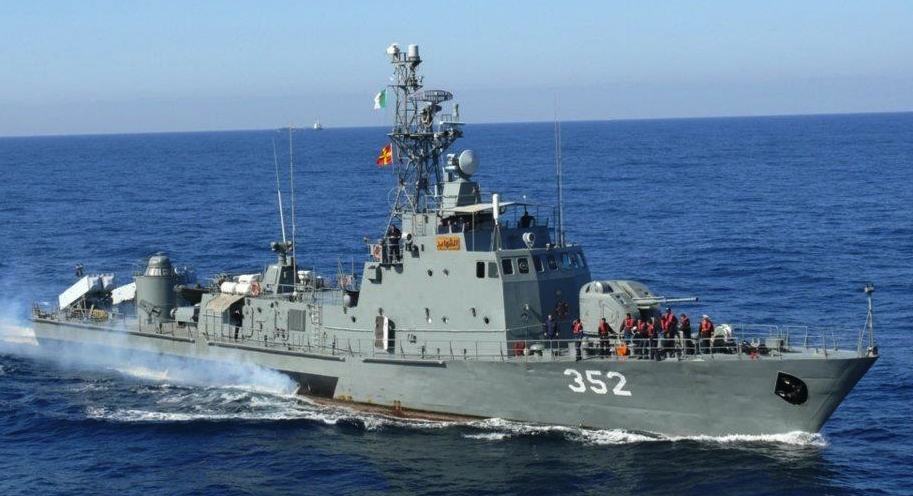
El Chihab is an Algerian navy corvette class Djebel Chenoua.

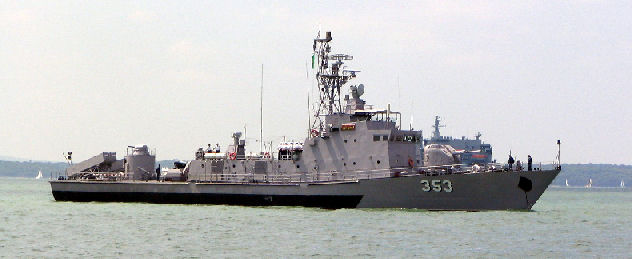
El Kirch is an Algerian navy corvette class Djebel Chenoua.
- New Constructions and Repairs Naval Company (ECRN) facility was inaugurated in Annaba in February 2016 Produces Sea Rescue and patrol boats Length overall Alusafe 2000 under license from Maritime Partner AS.

== See also ==
- International rankings of Algeria#Military and Defense
- Algerian People's National Armed Forces
- Economy of Algeria
