= Rafik Khalifa =

Algerian businessman living in London (born 1966)

Abdelmoumene Rafik Khalifa (born 1 October 1966) is an Algerian businessman living in London. He was condemned in Algeria to a life sentence, charged of criminal association, corruption, abuse of trust, and forgery. His trial was one of the largest in Algeria involving the embezzlement of more than $1 billion through a range of Khalifa-linked companies.

== Career ==
Rafik is the son of Laroussi Khelifa a former minister. He started his career as a pharmacist. In 1998, he founded Khalifa Bank, which managed the interests of small private shareholders and institutional shareholders related to the Algerian government. Continuing his activities in France, he quickly created an empire which employed 14,000 people. He was in the luxury cars rental business, before founding Khalifa TV in France, Khalifa Airways, and buying a private hotel in Cannes —which had belonged to the eccentric billionaire known as La môme Moineau— in September 2002.

Owner of three villas in Cannes, Rafik Khalifa wanted to create a ville nouvelle named "Algeria," triggering the attention of French media. He became close to the French show-business, getting to know Gérard Depardieu and Catherine Deneuve. However, in 2003, a judicial liquidation of his endebted firm was started. Khalifa then used shady methods to save his assets. An investigation revealed the disappearance of 50 million euros in the Khalifa Bank of Algiers. Khalifa was then suspected of having spent the money of personalities close to the Algerian President Bouteflika. 17 judicial investigations were opened against him, who took refuge in London in 2003. The Khalifa Bank was closed on orders of Bouteflika. Khalifa like Bouteflika belong to the same unchanged political regime since 1962.

== Trials ==
Khalifa's trial involved more than 100 defendants and 200 witnesses. In March 2007, he was condemned in Algeria, in absentia, to a life sentence, charged of criminal association, corruption, abuse of trust, and forgery.

A few days earlier, on 5 March 2007, the French justice had also issued a European arrest warrant against him. The Court of Nanterre had opened an investigation against Khalifa in 2003, charged of fraudulous bankruptcy, abuse of social assets (abus de bien sociaux; i.e. corruption) and money-laundering.

London authorized Khalifa's extradition in the end of August 2007. Algeria has also issued an international arrest warrant against him. Khalifa was extradited to Algeria in December 2013. Khalifa was sentenced to an 18-year imprisonment.

== See also ==
- Politics of Algeria
