= Antinea Airlines =

Airline of Algeria

IATA	ICAO	Call sign
HO	DJA	ANTINEA
- Founded: 1999
- Ceased operations: 2003
- Hubs: Houari Boumedienne Airport
- Headquarters: Algeria

Antinea Airlines was a passenger and cargo airline based in Algiers Houari Boumedienne Airport, Algeria that was founded in June 1999. The airline was merged into Khalifa Airways in 2001, and the company ceased to exist in 2003.

== See also ==
- List of defunct airlines of Algeria
