= List of Algerian provinces by area =

This article has been translated from the French Wikipedia equivalent.

The following is a list of the wilayat, or provinces, of the North African country of Algeria by area.

A map of the provinces of Algeria

Rank	Number on map	Name	Area (km^{2})	Percentage of area
1	11	Tamanrasset Province	557 906 km^{2}	23.42%
2	01	Adrar Province	427 368 km^{2}	17.94%
3	33	Illizi Province	284 618 km^{2}	11.94%
4	30	Ouargla Province	211 980 km^{2}	8.90%
5	08	Béchar Province	162 200 km^{2}	6.81%
6	37	Tindouf Province	159 000 km^{2}	6.68%
7	47	Ghardaïa Province	86 105 km^{2}	3.61%
8	32	El Bayadh Province	78 870 km^{2}	3.31%
9	17	Djelfa Province	66 415 km^{2}	2.79%
10	39	El Oued Province	54 573 km^{2}	2.29%
11	45	Naâma Province	29 950 km^{2}	1.26%
12	03	Laghouat Province	25 057 km^{2}	1.05%
13	07	Biskra Province	20 986 km^{2}	0.88%
14	14	Tiaret Province	20 673 km^{2}	0.87%
15	28	M'Sila Province	18 718 km^{2}	0.79%
16	12	Tébessa Province	14 227 km^{2}	0.60%
17	05	Batna Province	12 192 km^{2}	0.51%
18	40	Khenchela Province	9 811 km^{2}	0.41%
19	43	Mila Province	9 375 km^{2}	0.39%
20	22	Sidi Bel Abbès Province	9 150 km^{2}	0.38%
21	13	Tlemcen Province	9 061 km^{2}	0.38%
22	26	Médéa Province	8 866 km^{2}	0.37%
23	04	Oum El Bouaghi Province	7 638 km^{2}	0.32%
24	20	Saïda Province	6 764 km^{2}	0.28%
25	19	Sétif Province	6 504 km^{2}	0.27%
26	29	Mascara Province	5 941 km^{2}	0.24%
27	44	Aïn Defla Province	4 897 km^{2}	0.21%
28	48	Relizane Province	4 870 km^{2}	0.20%
29	02	Chlef Province	4 791 km^{2}	0.20%
30	41	Souk Ahras Province	4 541 km^{2}	0.19%
31	10	Bouira Province	4 439 km^{2}	0.19%
32	34	Bordj Bou Arreridj Province	4 115 km^{2}	0.17%
33	24	Guelma Province	4 101 km^{2}	0.17%
34	21	Skikda Province	4 026 km^{2}	0.17%
35	36	El Tarf Province	3 339 km^{2}	0.14%
36	06	Béjaïa Province	3 268 km^{2}	0.14%
37	38	Tissemsilt Province	3 152 km^{2}	0.13%
38	15	Tizi Ouzou Province	2 958 km^{2}	0.12%
39	18	Jijel Province	2 577 km^{2}	0.11%
40	46	Aïn Témouchent Province	2 379 km^{2}	0.11%
41	25	Constantine Province	2 187 km^{2}	0.09%
42	27	Mostaganem Province	2 175 km^{2}	0.09%
43	42	Tipaza Province	2 166 km^{2}	0.09%
44	31	Oran Province	2 121 km^{2}	0.09%
45	35	Boumerdès Province	1 591 km^{2}	0.07%
46	09	Blida Province	1 478 km^{2}	0.06%
47	23	Annaba Province	1 439 km^{2}	0.06%
48	16	Algiers Province	809 km^{2}	0.03%
Total		2 381 741 km^{2}	100%	

== See also ==
- List of Algerian Provinces by population
