= List of Algerian provinces by population =

This article has been translated from the French Wikipedia equivalent.

The following is a list of the wilayat, or provinces, of the North African country of Algeria by population.

A map of the provinces of Algeria

Wilaya	Name	1987 census	1998 census	2008 census
16	Algiers Province	1,687,579	2,561,992	2,988,145
31	Oran Province	916,678	1,155,464	1,584,607
19	Sétif Province	997,482	1,315,940	1,496,150
17	Djelfa Province	490,240	860,981	1,223,223
5	Batna Province	757,059	968,820	1,128,030
15	Tizi Ouzou Province	931,501	1,101,059	1,127,608
2	Chlef Province	679,717	884,978	1,013,718
9	Blida Province	704,462	787,069	1,009,892
28	M'Sila Province	605,578	815,045	991,846
13	Tlemcen Province	707,453	846,942	949,135
25	Constantine Province	662,330	815,032	943,112
6	Béjaïa Province	697,669	848,560	915,835
21	Skikda Province	619,094	787,118	904,195
14	Tiaret Province	574,786	728,513	946,823
26	Médéa Province	650,623	721,861	830,943
35	Boumerdès Province	646,870	645,497	802,083
29	Mascara Province	562,806	677,099	784,073
44	Aïn Defla Province	536,205	659,182	771,890
43	Mila Province	511,047	680,815	766,886
27	Mostaganem Province	504,124	629,445	746,947
48	Relizane Province	545,061	639,253	733,060
7	Biskra Province	429,217	588,648	730,262
34	Bordj Bou Arreridj Province	429,009	559,928	716,423
10	Bouira Province	525,460	626,586	695,583
39	El Oued Province	379,512	529,842	673,934
12	Tébessa Province	409,317	550,021	657,227
4	Oum El Bouaghi Province	402,683	533,711	644,364
23	Annaba Province	453,951	555,485	640,050
18	Jijel Province	471,319	574,336	636,948
42	Tipaza Province	615,140	505,382	617,661
22	Sidi Bel Abbès Province	444,047	529,704	604,744
30	Ouargla Province	286,696	438,831	558,558
24	Guelma Province	353,329	432,721	482,430
3	Laghouat Province	215,183	327,634	477,328
41	Souk Ahras Province	298,236	373,033	440,299
1	Adrar Province	216,931	311,952	439,693
36	El Tarf Province	276,836	354,213	411,783
40	Khenchela Province	243,733	348,122	386,683
46	Aïn Témouchent Province	271,454	326,611	384,565
47	Ghardaïa Province	215,955	296,926	375,988
20	Saïda Province	235,240	280,752	330,641
38	Tissemsilt Province	227,542	261,298	296,366
8	Béchar Province	183,896	230,482	274,866
32	El Bayadh Province	155,494	226,528	262,187
45	Naâma Province	112,858	165,578	209,470
11	Tamanrasset Province	94,219	151,814	198,691
33	Illizi Province	19,698	33,960	54,490
37	Tindouf Province	16,339	32,004	49,149
Total		22,971,658	29,276,767	34,080,030

== See also ==
- List of Algerian Provinces by area
