= Sahara Airlines (Algeria) =

Airline of Algeria

IATA	ICAO	Call sign
6S	SHD	-
- Founded: 1998
- Commenced operations: 1999
- Ceased operations: 2003
- Fleet size: 5 Fairchild Hiller FH-227
- Destinations: See Service below

Sahara Airlines was an airline company in Algeria. It operated domestic flights in Algeria between 1999 and 2003.

== Service ==
Sahara Airlines operated flights to many destinations in Algeria: Adrar, Algiers, Bechar, Batna, Ghardaia, Tindouf, Annaba, Oran, Constantine, Hassi messaoud, Tamanrasset, Ouargla.

== Code data ==
- IATA Code: 6S
- ICAO Code: SHD

== History ==
Sahara airlines company was founded in 1998 and started its flights in September 1999 with air hostess and stewardess trained by the company.

== Fleet ==
- 5 Fairchild Hiller FH-227

== See also ==
- List of defunct airlines of Algeria
