= List of airlines of Algeria =

This is a list of current airlines from Algeria.

Airline	Image	IATA	ICAO	Callsign	Commenced operations	Notes
Air Algérie		AH	DAH	AIR ALGERIE	1962	
Air Express Algeria			AEA	Air Express	2002	
Domestic Airlines		SF	DTH	TASSILI AIR	1997	Formerly Tassili Airlines
Star Aviation			DST	Star Aviation	2001	

== See also ==
- List of airlines
- List of defunct airlines of Algeria
