= Rym Airlines =

Airline of Algeria

- Founded: 2003
- Commenced operations: Never commenced (Proposed)
- Ceased operations: 2005
- Fleet size: 0 (3 Boeing 737-200 on order, cancelled)
- Parent company: Groupe BCIA
- Founders: Groupe BCIA

Rym Airlines was a proposed airline based in Oran, Algeria. Its main base was Oran Es Senia Airport.

== History ==
The airline was founded by Groupe BCIA to start operations in 2003. It had three Boeing 737-200 aircraft on order, but the transaction was cancelled. The airline ceased operations in 2005 because of the BCIA case, which began in 2003.

== See also ==
- List of defunct airlines of Algeria
