= North Africa Journal =

Magazine focusing exclusively on North African issues

- Founder: Arezki Daoud
- Founded: 1996; 30 years ago
- Country: United States
- Based in: Boston, Massachusetts
- Language: English
- Website: www.north-africa.com

The North Africa Journal is a Boston-based magazine focusing exclusively on North African issues, from politics and security to business, finance, industry to politics and human issues. The publication covers the regions of the Maghreb, Sahel and Egypt.

The magazine's contents are structured around several key economic topics from banking and finance, to energy and mining, all the way to corporate and people profiles. These topics ranging from the impact of Islamists on local and regional politics to the influence of oil and gas are covered weekly, with paying subscribers accessing all the premium content, while non-paying subscribers receiving limited content to their email addresses.

Established in 1996 by Arezki Daoud, the publication had over 63,000 subscribers in 2011, mainly English-speaking readers based in Europe, the Americas, Asia and the Middle East.

The majority of the subscribers are corporate executives and managers. However, the magazine is also a source of analysis used by governments, media, academia and NGOs.
