= Mass media in Algeria =

Algeria has more than 45 independent Arabic language and French language publications as well as 4 government-owned newspapers (two published in French and two in Arabic), but the government controls most printing presses and advertising. The Algerian newspapers with the largest circulations are Echourouk (1,800,000), Ennahar (1,600,000), El Khabar (1,000,000) and Quotidien d'Oran (700,000); all four are employee-owned. In 2004 and 2005, the government increased the access of Berber language and culture to both print and broadcast media.

Algérie Presse Service is the Algerian national press agency. It was created on December 1, 1961, following the national independence of Algeria from French control, to represent Algeria in the sphere of the world media. It has evolved into an institution that produces online and satellite services.

== Journalism ==
The written press in Algeria publishes in three languages: Arabic, French and Tamazight. The majority of print publications are privately owned. The print press also publishes online, on a daily basis, except for on Fridays (public observation of the Islamic holy day).

Since the end of 2016, the number of daily visitors of news websites and online editions of newspapers surpasses the number of daily readers of print newspapers.

Writing in Arabic, English and French, Algerian bloggers cover social, cultural and political topics.

Arabic-language newspapers include Echorouk, El Khabar, and El Massa. French-language newspapers include El Watan and El Moudjahid. English-language newspapers include the North Africa Journal. Defunct newspapers include Lisan al-Din (Language of Faith) founded in 1912, and the longer-lived Al-balagh al-jazairi (Algerian Messenger) founded in 1926 by Sufi Ahmad al-Alawi (1869–1934).

== Censorship ==
There is no direct censorship, but laws set out prison terms and fines for insulting or defaming the president, MPs, judges and the army. Media rights bodies have accused the government of using the law to control the private press, in addition to using indirect pressure such as suspending building permits for newspaper's offices, discouraging relationships with private advertisers, and prompting tax or creditor investigations.

Algerian dailies mark the anniversary of the introduction of the defamation laws by suspending publication in a protest known as a "day without newspapers."

== Telephones and telephony ==
According to the CIA/The World Fact by 2008, along with the rapid increase in mobile cellular subscribers, combined fixed-line and mobile telephone density surpassed 100 telephones per 100 persons. Algeria is also a participant in Medarabtel. This includes satellite earth stations with 51 services (including Intelsat, Intersputnik, and Arabsat) that links Algeria with most other parts of the world.

== Television ==
In the area of broadcasting, the government has maintained a monopoly since 1962. Algerian television was somewhat democratized by the new constitution of 1989. Entreprise nationale de télévision (ENTV) is the national entity that oversees public television broadcasting. It manages the television channels Canal Algérie, Algérie 3, Amazigh tv 4 in Tamazight and the religious channel Coran tv 5 which broadcasts Islamic religious programming. The government purchases many commercial programs for broadcast. Canal Algérie also broadcasts online, without interruption.

=== Satellite broadcasts ===
The majority of the population of Algeria prefers to watch satellite broadcasts of Arab and French stations. The number of satellite dishes is estimated at 34 million. (Arabic and French). A bill is currently being studied that would prohibit satellite dishes on the facade of houses that face streets and boulevards. Many satellite services operate in Algeria, including Camagraph, Stream System, Magenta, and Condor. French-owned Canal+ has recently signed a special agreement with Algeria.

Algerian television channels:

- Télévision Algérienne (state-owned broadcaster)
- Canal Algérie
- Algérie 3
- Tamazight TV
- Coran TV
- Echorouk TV
- Echorouk News Channel (news outlet of the Echorouk Media Group)
- El Djazairiya TV
- El Heddaf TV
- Ennahar TV
- Hoggar TV
- Dzairshop TV
- Numedia News TV
- L'Index TV (Constantine regional channel)
- Dzair TV (owned by business tycoon Ali Haddad)
- Al Atlas TV (shut down before presidential elections for its government criticisms)
- Djurdjura Children Channel
- Samira Women-dedicated Channel
- El Bilad TV
- Wiam TV (created just days before presidential elections to support independent candidate Abdelaziz Bouteflika)
- KBC or El Khabar Broadcasting Channel (owned by El Khabar Media Group)

Until now there are 50 channels broadcasting offshore. All these channels have large bureaus in Algiers but legally registered in Jordan, Bahrain, and the UK. With the recently published media law, these TV networks will have to comply with Algeria law to become Algerian licensed TV.

== Radio ==
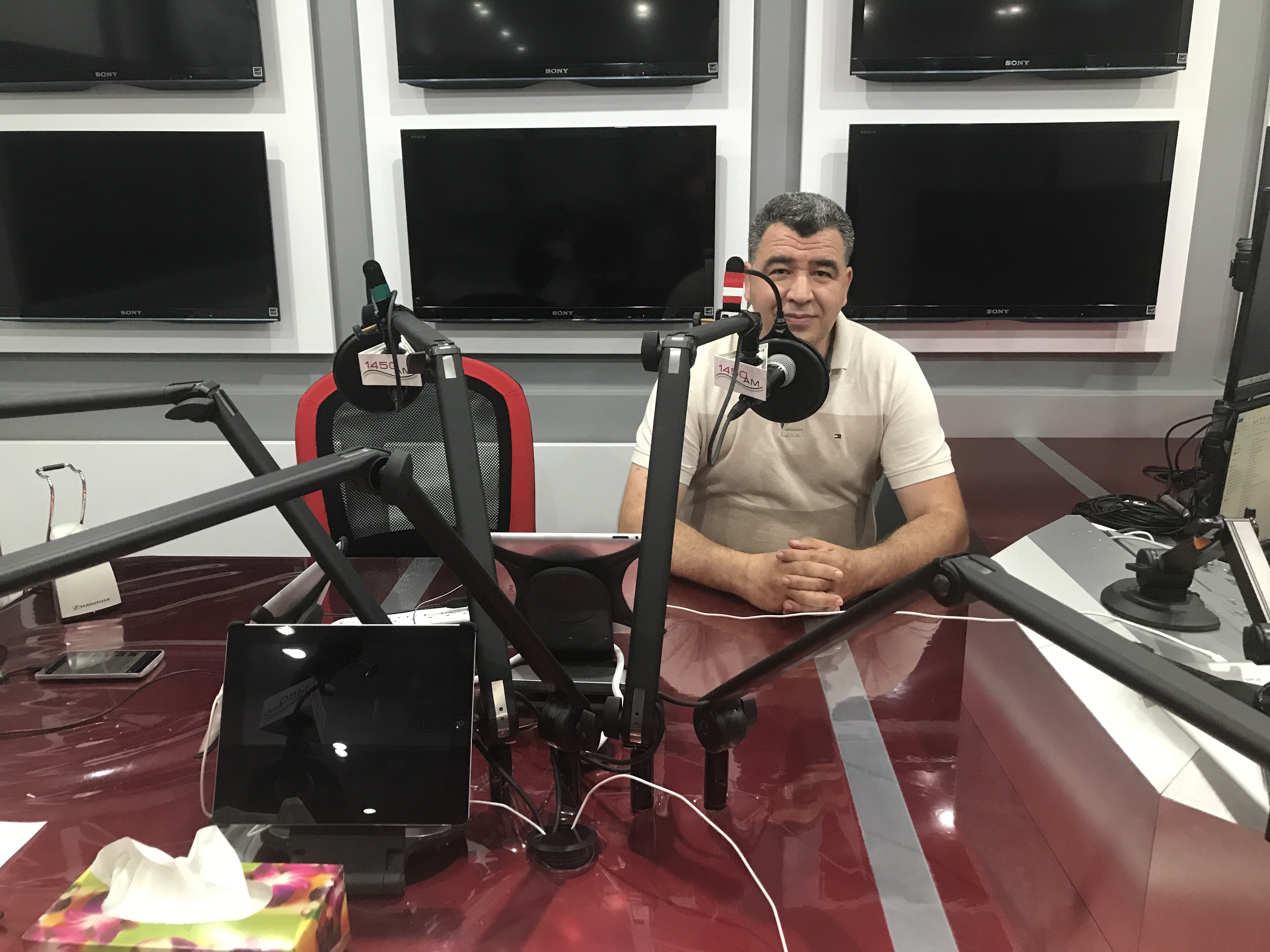
Lamine Foura, radio journalist and founder of Medias Maghreb in Quebec

Radio Algérienne is the public radio broadcasting entity. It manages three national broadcast stations, two with national formats and 32 regional stations. This entity, which has 34 million Algerian listeners, broadcasts in Arabic, Berber, and French.

Chorouk TV identifies itself as the first private satellite TV channel in Algeria launched just after the newly passed media law enabling businesspeople/journalists to create their own TV and radio stations. The channel will show about ten major thematic programmes dealing with politics, business, social, sport, entertainment and music. It will broadcast a one-hour and half news bulletin similar to Aljazeera’s Hasad Al Yawm (Today’s News Harvest). But in general, it identifies itself as Dubai-based MBC network, namely family/edutainment channel.

== Internet ==
As of 2014 Algeria had 40000 Internet hosts and 31.7 million internet users.

== See also ==
- Censorship in Algeria
- Telecommunications in Algeria
- Internet in Algeria
- List of newspapers in Algeria
- Cinema of Algeria
- Actual list with newspaper in Algeria

== Bibliography ==
- Toyin Falola; Daniel Jean-Jacques, eds. (2015). "Algeria: Media". Africa: an Encyclopedia of Culture and Society. ABC-CLIO. ISBN 978-1-59884-666-9.
- "Algeria", Freedom of the Press, USA: Freedom House, 2016, OCLC 57509361, archived from the original on 19 November 2018
