= Telecommunications in Algeria =

Types of communications in Algeria, including telephones, mass media and the Internet.

In October 2013, the Algeria Regulatory Authority for Post and Telecommunication awarded 3G licences to the three mobile operators in Algeria: Mobilis, Ooredoo Algeria and Djezzy. The mobile operator companies promised their clients better mobile internet service.

== Telephony ==
Telephones - main lines in use: 3.068 million (2007)
country comparison to the world: 48

Telephones - mobile cellular: 43.227 million (2015)
country comparison to the world: 31

Telephone system: domestic: good service in north but sparse in south; domestic satellite system with 12 earth stations (20 additional domestic earth stations are planned)
international: 5 submarine cables; microwave radio relay to Italy, France, Spain, Morocco, and Tunisia; coaxial cable to Morocco and Tunisia; participant in Medarabtel; satellite earth stations - 2 Intelsat (1 Atlantic Ocean and 1 Indian Ocean), 1 Intersputnik, and 1 Arabsat

== Mass media ==
- Radio broadcast stations: AM 25, FM 1, shortwave 8 (1999)
- Radios: 7.1 million (1997)
- Television broadcast stations: 46 (plus 216 repeaters) (1995)
- Televisions: 3.1 million (1997)

== Internet ==
Internet Service Providers (ISPs): 03 (2005)

Internet Hosts: 477 (2008)
country comparison to the world: 161

Internet Users: 36.2 Million (2024)
country comparison to the world: 77

Country codes: .dz

== Controversy ==
In October 2013, the Algeria Regulatory Authority for Post and Telecommunication awarded 3G licences to the three mobile operators in Algeria: Mobilis, Ooredoo, and Djezzy. The mobile operator companies promised their clients better mobile internet service.

The authority imposed on mobile operators a 3G double numbering license. This double numbering system requires any citizen that wishes to use the 3G service, must hold two separate 2G and 3G mobile numbers. Having two numbers with two different mobile internet access is more expensive and inconvenient.

== Anonymous involvement ==
In August 2012 a group in the Anonymous irc channel #OpAlgeria started an operation against the Algeria Regulatory Authority for Post and Telecommunication. This operation was started because the authority made a decision to require authorization of its users before allowing them to use any kind of encryption (for example; IpSec). They also will require authorization for any type of virtual private network (VPN) technology (for example; PPTP, L2TP, GRE tunneling, OpenVPN, and most other protocols that allow protection of information).

== See also ==
- Media of Algeria
