= Scouting and Guiding in Algeria =

The Scout and Guide movement in Algeria is served by

- Algerian Muslim Scouts, member of the World Organization of the Scout Movement
- Although Algeria does have a Guiding organization, work towards World Association of Girl Guides and Girl Scouts membership recognition remains unclear
