= Chinese people in Algeria =

Ethnic group

Related ethnic groups
- Overseas Chinese

The Chinese in Algeria are a group of Chinese nationals residing in Algeria. The recent migration of Chinese to Algeria is driven by commerce with most Chinese nationals working on infrastructure projects.

Tensions between Chinese merchants and locals in Algiers flared up in August 2009 when there was a clash in the Algiers suburb of Bab Ezzouar, sparked by a confrontation between a migrant and a shop owner that drew in 1000 people. A non-identified group of assailants attacked a Chinese owned company in Annaba in October 2016.

== See also ==
- Algeria–China relations
- Chinese diaspora
- Ethnic groups in Algeria
