= Water supply and sanitation in Algeria =

- The flag of Algeria

Data
- Water coverage (broad definition): (improved water source): 84% (2010) (JMP)
- Sanitation coverage (broad definition): (improved sanitation): 95% (2010) (JMP)
- Continuity of supply: 22 (2013)
- Average urban water use (L/person/day): 65–220 depending on the province
- Average urban water and sanitation tariff (US$/m^{3}): 0.08 (residential 1st consumption block, 2005)
- Share of household metering: high
- Annual investment in WSS: 4 billion USD (2010–2014 average including dams and irrigation)
- Share of external financing: Mainly by the state

Institutions
- Decentralization to municipalities: No
- National water and sanitation company: AdE (drinking water) and ONA (sanitation)
- Water and sanitation regulator: None
- Responsibility for policy setting: Ministry of Water Resources
- Sector law: Loi 05-12 of August 4, 2005
- No. of urban service providers: 2 (AdE for drinking water and ONA for sanitation)

Drinking water supply and sanitation in Algeria is characterized by achievements and challenges. Among the achievements is a substantial increase in the amount of drinking water supplied from reservoirs, long-distance water transfers and desalination at a low price to consumers, thanks to the country's substantial oil and gas revenues. These measures increased per capita water supply despite a rapidly increasing population. Another achievement is the transition from intermittent to continuous water supply in the capital Algiers in 2011, along with considerable improvements in wastewater treatment resulting in better water quality at beaches. These achievements were made possible through a public-private partnership with a private French water company. The number of wastewater treatment plants throughout the country increased rapidly from only 18 in 2000 to 113 in 2011, with 96 more under construction. However, there are also many challenges. One of them is poor service quality in many cities outside Algiers with 78% of urban residents suffering from intermittent water supply. Another challenge is the pollution of water resources. There has also been insufficient progress concerning reuse of treated water, a government priority in this dry country.

== Access ==
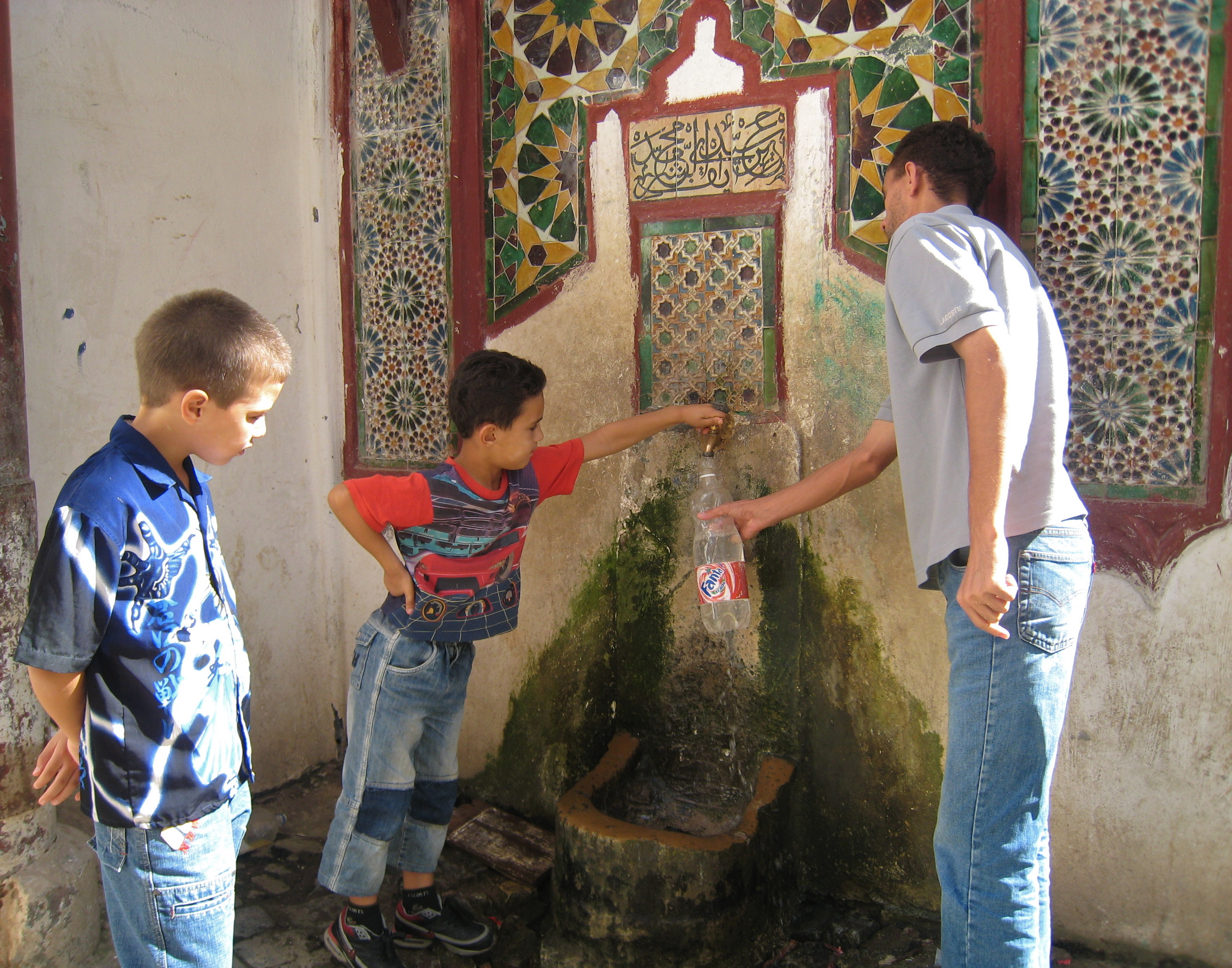
Traditional fountains such as this one in the old city of Algiers are being replaced by piped drinking water supply to homes.

In 2015, in Algeria 84% of the population had access to "improved" water, 84% and 82%, in urban and rural areas, respectively. In 2015, there were still around 7 million lacking access to "improved" water. Regarding sanitation, 88% of the population had access to "improved" sanitation, 90% and 82%, in urban and rural areas, respectively.

According to the UN, 83% of Algerians had access to an improved water source in 1978, including 74% that had access to drinking water on their premises. The remainder had access to fountains, standpipes, protected wells or protected springs, mostly in rural areas. 95% of Algerians had access to improved sanitation. The Algerian government states that access water supply is higher than shown in the UN statistics, with 93% being linked to drinking water networks in 2010. It also says that 86% of the population are connected to sewer networks.

== Service quality ==
Only 22% of urban residents in Algeria receive water 24 hours per day. 34% receive water only once per day, 24% every second day and 14% only every third day. In some regions water only comes every 10 days, such as in the Bouzeguène District and other districts in the Kabylie region. These shortages are poor execution and lack of completion of works, poor maintenance and numerous illegal connections to the network. Residents store water in tanks or jerry cans in their houses, or fill up jerry cans at water towers particularly during the summer. In Sétif in Northeastern Algeria water shortages have led to protests and clashes with the police. In contrast, in Algiers continuous water supply was established with the help of a French private company, SUEZ, in 2011.

== Water resources and infrastructure ==
Drinking water in Algeria comes from conventional resources – surface water and groundwater – as well as non-conventional resources such as seawater desalination.

=== Conventional water resources ===
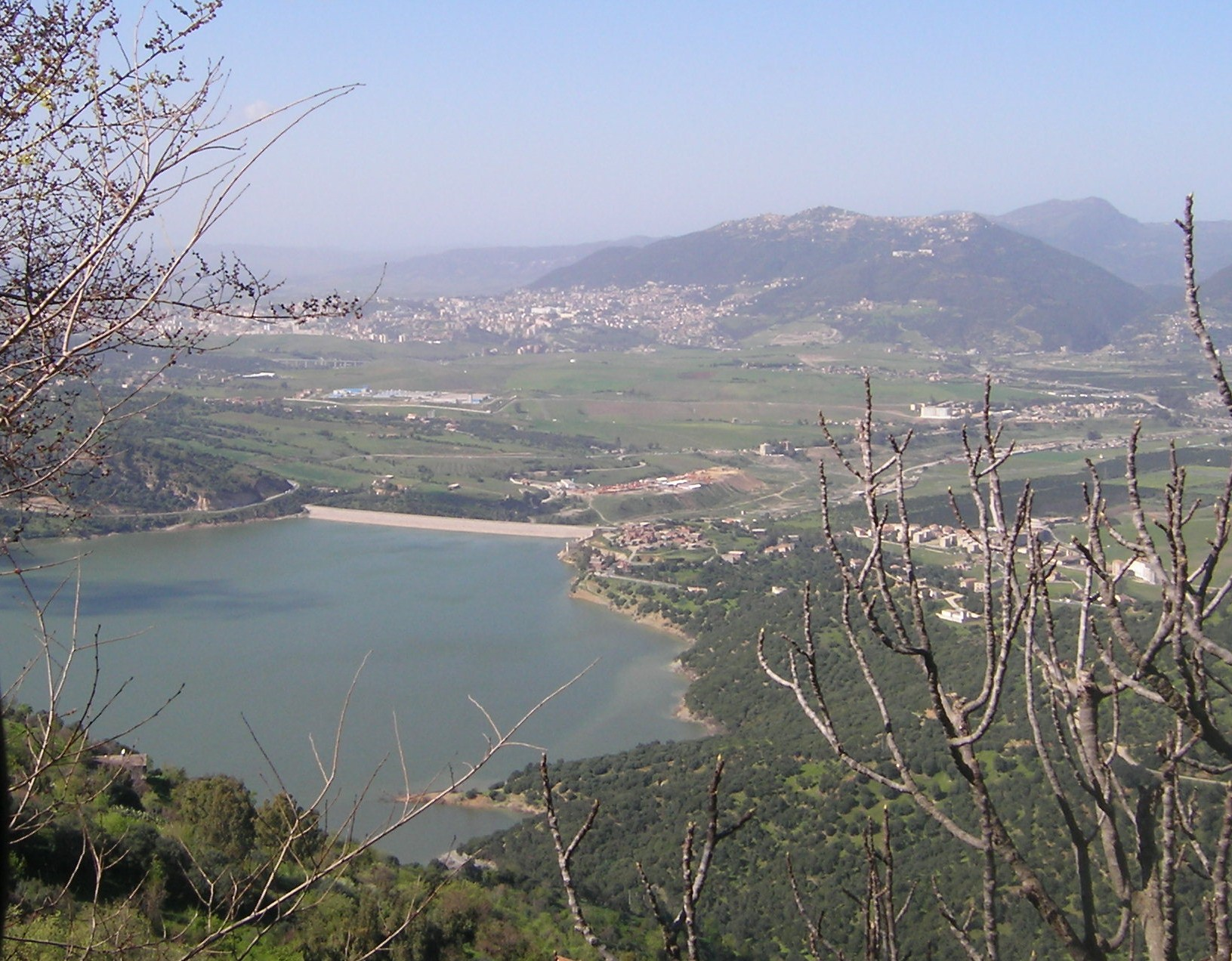
Reservoirs are a major source of drinking water in Algeria. For example, the Taksebt reservoir provides drinking water for residents of three provinces.

Since rainfall is highly seasonal, surface water is stored in 72 reservoirs with a total production capacity of 7.4 billion m^{3} per year in 2009. Most of this water is used for irrigation. Total drinking water supply was about 2.8 billion m^{3} per year. One of the largest reservoir systems in Algeria is the Beni Haroun complex in Mila Province that supplies water for irrigation and drinking water to 4 million people in six provinces in the East of Algeria. Another large system is the Taksebt complex in Tizi Ouzou in Kabylie. It supplies three provinces, including parts of the capital Algiers, with drinking water. In the Bouïra Province, water is supplied from the Koudiat Acerdoune dam. The longest water transfer project in Algeria, dubbed "project of the century", transfers non-renewable groundwater from In Salah to Tamanrasset in the Sahara over a distance of 750 km. It was completed in 2011 at a cost of US$2.5 billion.

In some parts of the country, such as in the valleys of El Oued and Ouargla, a rising water table due to seepage from septic tanks was a major problem. Beginning in 2005 at a cost of almost US$1 billion sewers were laid, pumping stations and treatment plants were built to convey the reclaimed water to agricultural areas for reuse.

Pollution of water resources has reached a worrying degree. Groundwater in the Mitidja plain close to Algiers is polluted with nitrates, and groundwater in coastal areas is often damaged by saline intrusion from the sea due to overpumping. This is the case in the Oran, Algiers and Jijel areas. Major parts of the rivers Tafna, Macta, Chéliff, Soummam and Seybousse are polluted. Some of them, such as the country's largest river, the Chéliff that supplies the Oran area, are used for drinking water supply. In the Constantine area the level of manganese and of chlorides in drinking water was close to those allowed by the WHO as of 2004.

=== Non-conventional water resources ===
==== Desalination ====
Algeria had 15 seawater desalination plants along its coast in 2011 with a capacity of 2.3 million m^{3}/day. It plans to build 43 more until 2019. Several desalination plants supply the Oran area that is particularly water-scarce. The first one was inaugurated in 2005 under the name Kahrama close to the industrial zone of Arzew. 20,000 m^{3}/day are supplied to industry and 70,000 m^{3}/day to the city. Two smaller plants became operational a few months later. In 2009 the first phase of a much larger plant with a capacity of 200,000 m^{3}/day was put into production in Chatt el Hilal to supply Aïn Témouchent and Oran. Another 200,000 m^{3}/day plant in Mostaganem was under construction as of 2010, as well as a plant in Mactaa with a capacity of 500,000 m^{3}/day, making it one of the largest plants in the world. Prior to the completion of the Mactaa plant, the Hamma plant in Algiers completed in 2008 was the largest desalination plant in Africa with a capacity of 200,000 m^{3}/day.

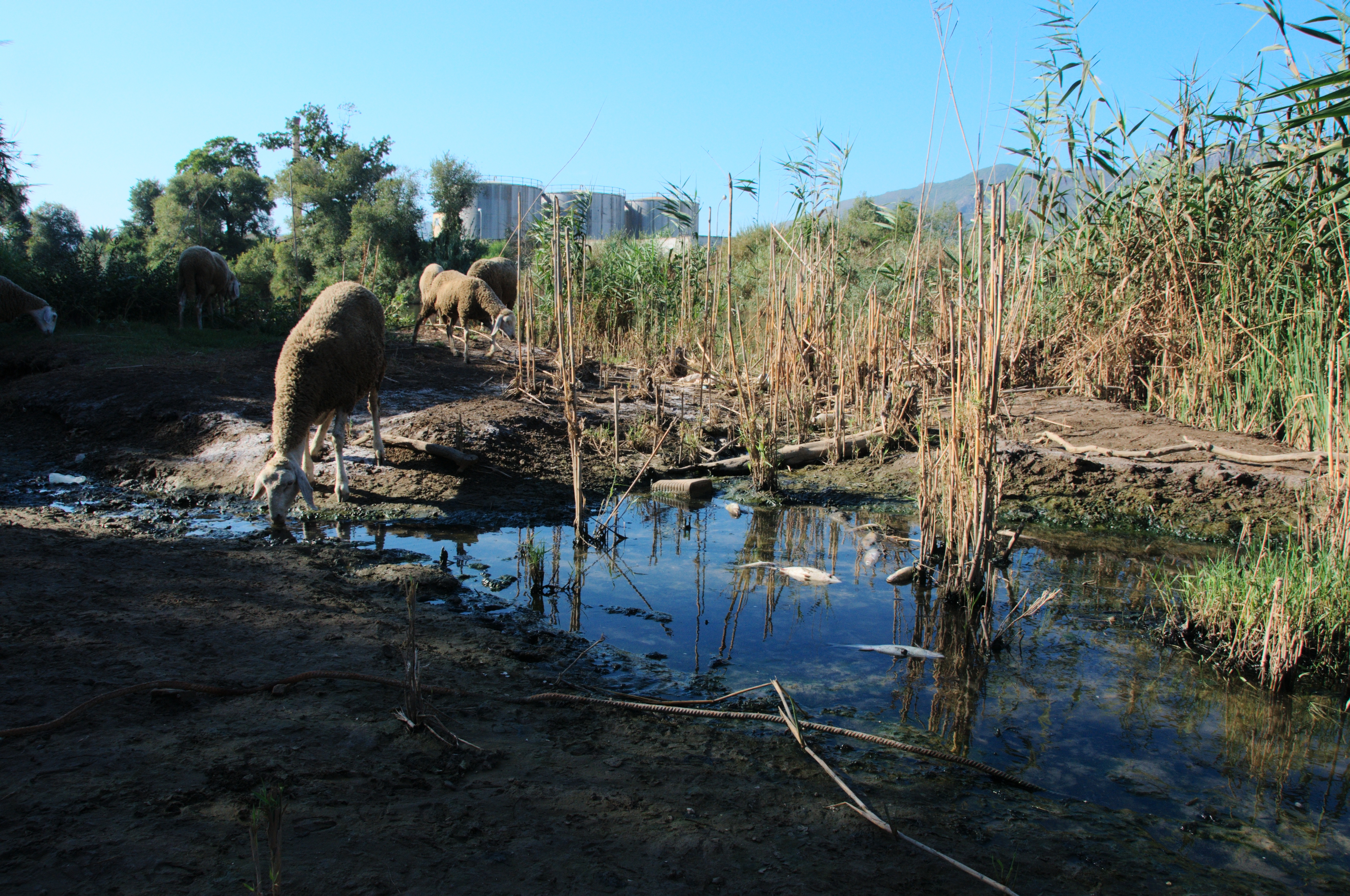
Water pollution is a serious issue in Algeria, as shown here in the Oued Soummam.

==== Water reuse ====
The reuse of treated wastewater for irrigation is a priority of the state. A government decree – Decree No. 07-149 of 20 May 2007 – sets out the procedures to grant a permit for the use of reclaimed water for irrigation. However, as of 2010 only 510 hectares were irrigated with reclaimed water. An additional 3,800 hectares were fully equipped for reuse without being operated. Studies for additional projects for irrigation of another 9,800 hectares with reclaimed water were completed.

=== Infrastructure ===
The water distribution system in Algeria is 105,000 km long. AdE manages a network of 50,000 km as well as 2,528 wells, 72 water treatment plants, 10 desalination plants, 1,141 pumping stations and 4,798 reservoirs.

The sewer system is 41,000 km long and there are 113 municipal wastewater treatment plants, including 56 using activated sludge technology and 67 mostly smaller plants using different kinds of lagoon technologies. There were only 18 plants in the country in 2000; 96 more plants were under construction in 2011.

== Water use ==
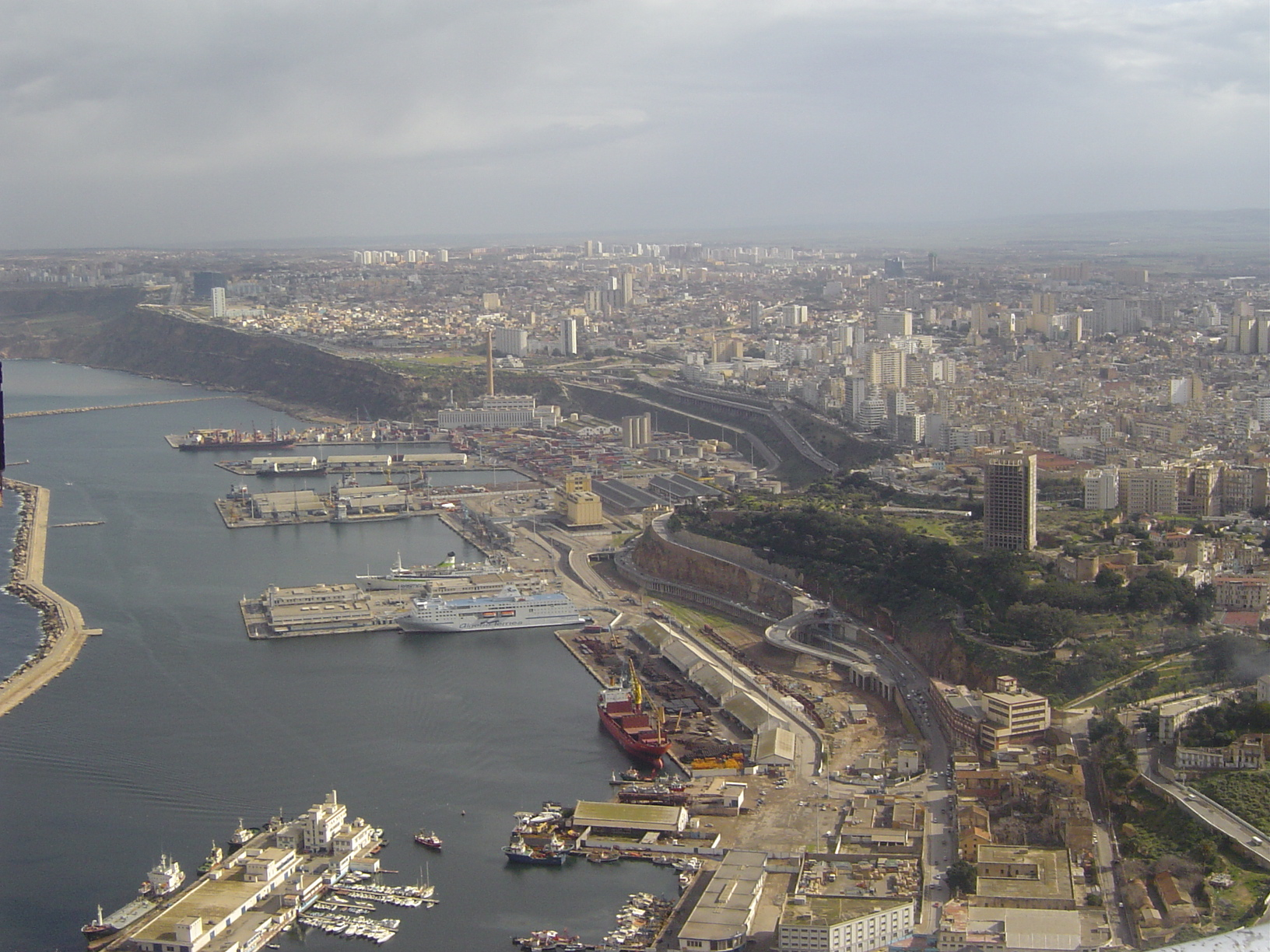
The city of Oran in the dry western part of Algeria relies increasingly on desalination, after having suffered from protracted drought.

According to government sources, in 2011 average water production was as high as 170 liter per capita and day. As of 2000, per capita water production varied between different parts of the country. It was highest in Ghardaïa with 220 liter per capita per day and lowest in Sidi Bel Abbès with 0only 65 liter. In Oran and Mostaganem water production was only 70 liter. Actual water use is lower than the above figures because of distribution losses. Non-revenue water, consisting of physical and administrative losses, was estimated at 40% in 2004.

== Responsibility for water supply and sanitation ==
=== Policy and regulation ===
The Ministry of Water Resources is in charge of policy-making for drinking water supply and sanitation, as well as for water resources management. Within the Ministry there is a directorate for drinking water and another directorate for sanitation and the environment. The Ministry also has 48 branches in each province (wilaya) of Algeria.

=== Service provision ===
80% of water distribution systems in Algeria are under the responsibility of Algérienne des Eaux (AdE), a state-owned company. Most sewer systems are under the responsibility of the Office National d'Assainissement (ONA). Both entities were created in 2001 and operate under the supervision of the Ministry of Water Resources that was established a year earlier.

AdE serves 3.4 million customers in 814 out of 1,541 municipalities. By law it is charged not only to provide water services, but also to promote water conservation and to increase public awareness. The company operates extensive water transmission systems that transfer water over long distances, often covering several provinces. AdE has branches (unités) in each of the country's 48 provinces. In each of the four largest cities of Algeria, a joint subsidiary of AdE and ONA provides water and sanitation services:

- SEEAL in Algiers and in neighboring Tipaza,
- SEACO in Constantine,
- SEOR in Oran, and
- SEATA in Annaba and in neighboring El Taref.

In other parts of its service area, AdE directly provides water services through 15 "zones", each comprising two to four provinces. In 2014, AdE had 25,000 employees.

ONA operates sanitation systems on behalf of 708 municipalities and has more than 8,000 employees. It operates 68 wastewater treatment plants, about half the plants in the country. The remainder are operated by private companies operating under management contracts in the largest cities or by municipalities.

The Algerian Energy Company (AEC) develops power plants as well as desalination plants. It is a subsidiary of Sonatrach and Sonelgaz.

The private sector operates the water supply and sanitation systems of three large cities, i.e. Algiers, Oran and Constantine, under management contracts with AdE and ONA.

== Financial aspects ==
=== Investment and financing ===
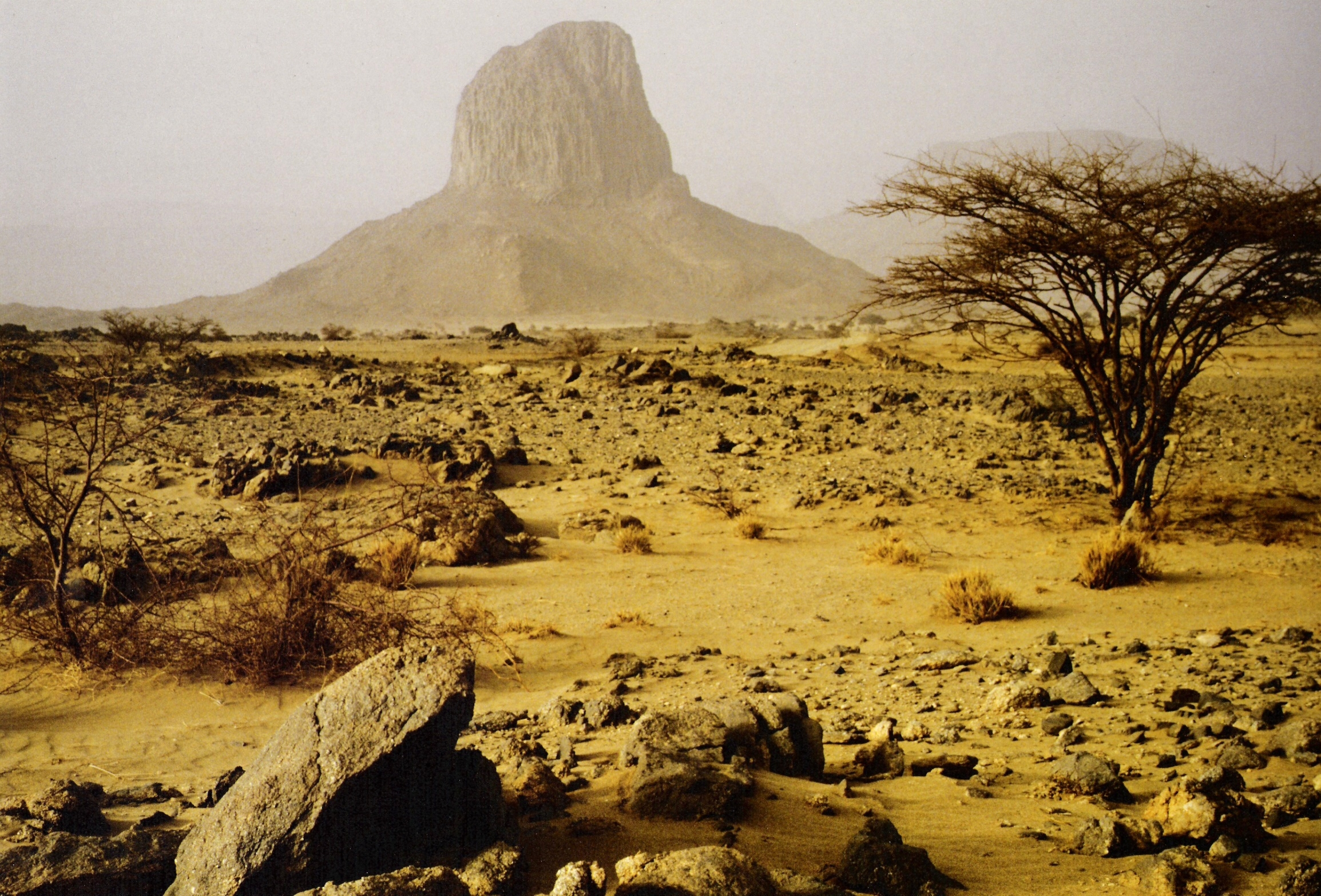
The Tamanrasset area in the Algerian Sahara benefited from a water transfer over a distance of 750km, completed in 2001 at a cost 2.5 billion US dollars.

Algeria plans to invest 20 billion US dollar in the water sector during the Five-Year Plan 2010–2014. Dams, which have accounted for 43% of water investments in 1995–2004, continue to be an important focus of water investments. Most investments are financed by the Algerian state from its vast oil and gas revenues. However, many desalination plants are financed by foreign direct investment through Build-Operate-Transfer (BOT) contracts.

=== Tariffs and cost recovery ===
The legal basis for water and sanitation tariffs is Decree 05-13 of January 9, 2005, on tariff policy (politique de tarification). It specifies five tariff zones: the hydrographic zones of Algiers, Oran, Costantine, Chlef and Ouargla covering together the entire country. However, in practice water and sanitation tariffs are almost the same throughout the zones, with tariffs being only 3 percent lower in the Chlef zone and about 8 percent lower in the Ouargla zones compared to the three other zones. Tariffs comprise a fixed and a variable component. The decree also defines three user categories: residential; administration and services; as well as industrial and touristic. The variable tariff component for residential users increases by consumption blocks. In the highest of the four blocks is 6.5 times more expensive than in the lowest block. The tariff in the other two user categories corresponds to the tariff in the highest residential consumption block. Tariffs are very low and are far from covering the costs of supply. Tariff increases have to be approved by the national government.

The first block of the residential tariffs, also called "social block" (tranche sociale), is charged until a consumption of 25 cubic meter per quarter, corresponding to 55 liter per capita per day for a family of five. In 2005 this tariff was 6.3 Algerian Dinar per cubic meter or 9 US Cents in the Algiers, Oran and Constantine zones. In 2014, this tariff remained unchanged according to the website of AdE. This tariff is about 20 times lower than water tariffs in Central Europe. The sewer tariff is even lower than the water tariff. For residential users in the first block in the zones Algiers, Constantine and Annaba it is 2.35 Algerian dinar per cubic meter or 3 US cents.

== External cooperation ==
The European Union (EU), through the European Commission, is an important external partner for the Algerian water sector. It provided a grant of 30 million Euro in 2011 to support sanitation through a program called EAU II. An earlier 20 million Euro grant called EAU I financed the updating of the National Water Plan, an operational plan for the Ghrib dam, an early warning and forecasting system for floods in Sidi Bel Abbès as well as an electronic documentation system for the Ministry of Water Resources. In 2011 the Société Wallonne des Eaux (SWDE) from Belgium and AdE signed a twinning contract to improve water quality monitoring. The contract had a duration of 18 months and was supported by the EU. It was followed by a second contract with a duration of three years signed in December 2013.
