= Al Qods Shopping Mall =

Centre Commercial Al Qods
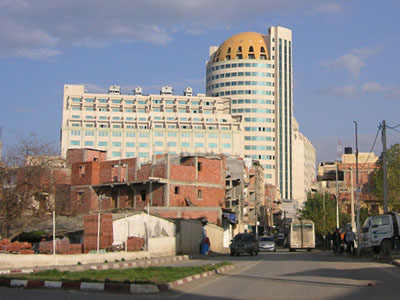
- Location: Algiers, Algeria
- Coordinates: 36°45′34.1″N 2°57′50.3″E
- Opened: 15 February 2008
- Owner: Sidar
- Num. of stores: 430
- Floor area: 1,780,000 square feet (165,000 m^{2})
- Floors: 18
- Parking: 1000 places
- Website: www.sidar-dz.com/en/projet-05.php

The Centre Commercial Al Qods (Arabic: المركز التجاري القدس) is a shopping mall in Algiers, Algeria.
