= NUR Reactor =

Research reactor in Algiers, Algeria

Coordinates: 36°43′34″N 3°00′20″E

NUR Reactor (acronym for Nuclear Uranium Reactor, the word nur (نور) also translates to "light" in Arabic), is an open pool research reactor at Centre de Dévéloppement des Techniques Nucléaires in Algiers.

Built by INVAP, it is 1MWt and based on RA-6. It achieved first criticality in April 1989.
