= Khalifa Airways =

Airline of Algeria

IATA	ICAO	Call sign
K6	KZW	KHALIFA AIR
- Founded: June 1999
- Commenced operations: August 1999
- Ceased operations: 2003
- Hubs: Houari Boumedienne Airport
- Focus cities: Oran Es Senia Airport
- Frequent-flyer program: Khalifa Miles
- Subsidiaries: Antinea Airlines (100%)
- Fleet size: 59
- Destinations: 72
- Parent company: Groupe Khalifa (100%)
- Headquarters: Algiers, Algeria
- Key people: Abdelmoumene Rafik Khalifa
- Website: khalifaairways-dz.com

Khalifa Airways (Arabic: الخطوط الجوية الخليفة) was a passenger and cargo airline based in Algiers, Algeria which was founded in June 1999 by Rafik Khalifa and ceased flying in 2003. The airline served internal routes within Algeria, along with international services in Africa, Europe and the Middle East.

== History ==
The airline was founded in June 1999. Authorisation to launch services was given by the government in August 1999; operations started that month. A Boeing 737-400 was leased from Pegasus Airlines late that year. In 2001, Khalifa Airways ordered three Airbus A340-300 aircraft, along with five A330-200s and ten A320s, scheduled for delivery in 2004.

The airline was liquidated by a French court on 10 July 2003 after it failed to make a €5 million payment to creditors.

Khalifa Airways is also known for having been the sponsor of Olympique de Marseille from 2001 to 2003.

On March 22, 2007, the International Herald Tribune reported that the company's founder had been convicted in absentia and sentenced to life in prison for his involvement in the 2003 failure of Khalifa Bank and associated companies, including Khalifa Airways.

== Services ==
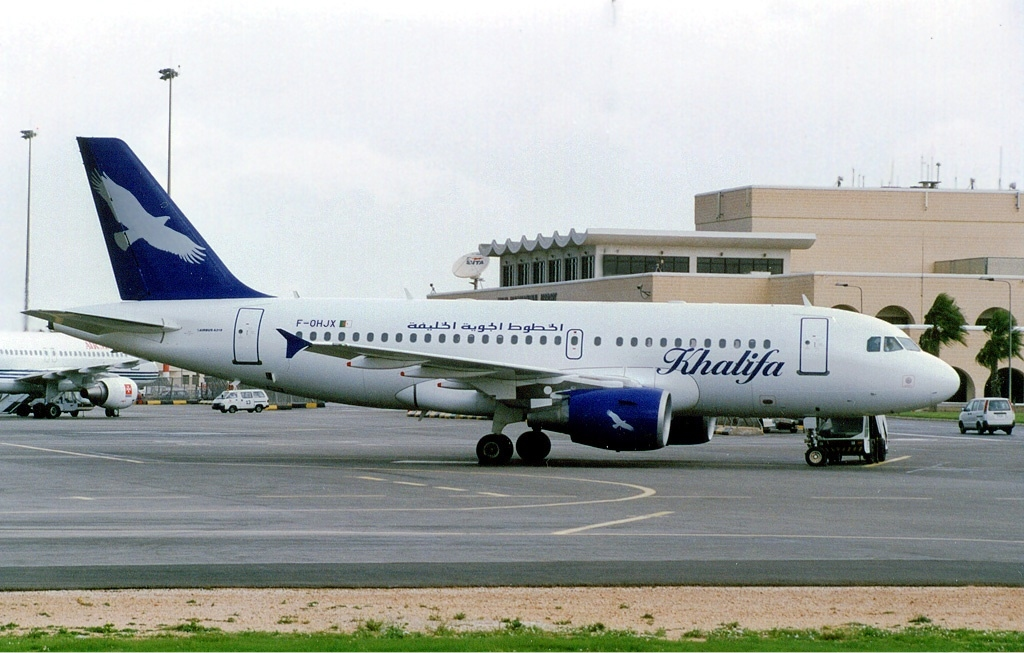
Khalifa Airways Airbus A319

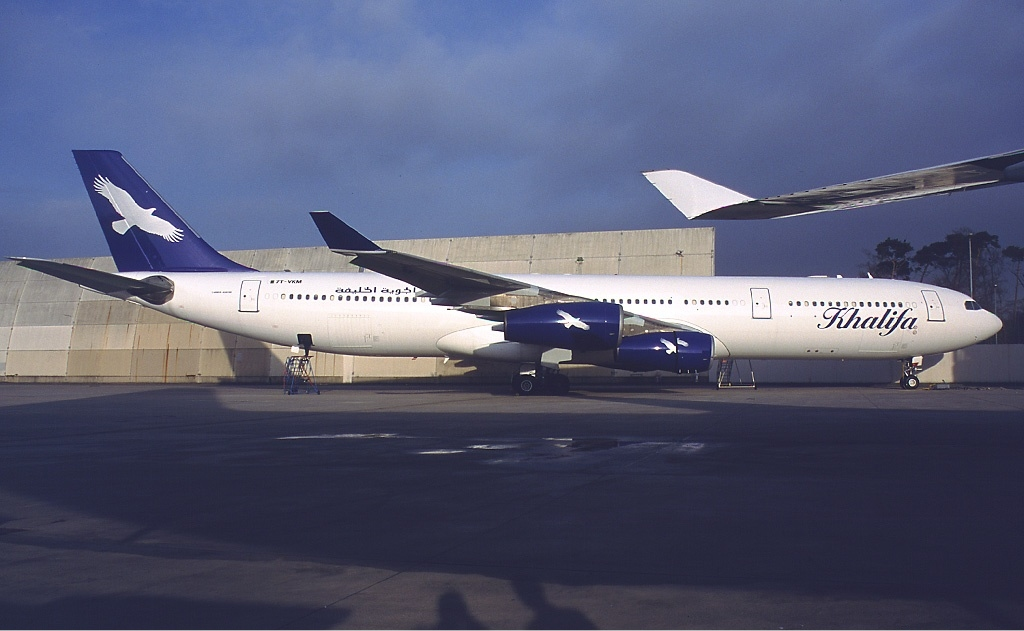
Khalifa Airways Airbus A340-300

Khalifa Airways served the following destinations throughout its history:

- Algeria
  - Algiers
  - Adrar
  - Annaba
  - Batna
  - Bejar
  - Bejaia
  - Constantine
  - El Oued
  - Ghardaia
  - Jijel
  - Hassi Messaoud
  - Tamanrasset
  - Tbessa
  - Tiaret
  - Tindouf
  - Tlemcen
- France
  - Lyon
  - Marseille
  - Toulouse
- Spain
  - Alicante
  - Barcelona
  - Palma de Mallorca

== Fleet ==
Khalifa Airways operated the following equipment throughout its history:

- Airbus A300-600F
- Airbus A310-300
- Airbus A319-100
- Airbus A320-200
- Airbus A330-300
- Airbus A340-300
- ATR 42-300
- ATR 72-500
- Boeing 737-400
- Boeing 737-800
- Bombardier Challenger 604

== See also ==
- List of airlines of Algeria
- Transport in Algeria
