= Military history of Algeria =

The military history of Algeria covers a vast time period and complex events. It interacts with multiple military events in the region for independence and stability.

== Independence from Carthage ==
The Punic Wars were a series of wars fought between the Roman Republic and the city-state of Carthage. During these wars the Algerians took the opportunity to become independent of Carthage, and Algerian kingdoms were established.

== Al-Andalus ==
Horses, but few chariots which were largely obsolete, gave scouts, raiders, and rare armored riders an advantage in speed, momentum behind each forward blow during a charge, and height to reach over the shields of opposing infantry. One helpful aspect of chariots was that after a very successful raid that found much plunder but not much resistance or pursuit, a raiding party could fill the basket of the chariot and haul plunder with it.

Alternatively, a good archer could stockpile bundles of pre-positioned quivers full of arrows under piles of sand, circle a small enemy formation, taunt them into pursuit if they were ill-disciplined, then shoot arrows while retreating. Then, they could roll on back to the buried bundles of arrows, then keep shooting.

Roman auxiliaries performed this kind of attack while hiding the fact that a larger force of infantry encamped a few miles away. For all the enemy knew, it was just another raid. A chariot provided a stable platform so that with a separate driver, an archer did not have to be as specially trained as nomadic horse archers often were, and had room for more spare quivers to hang off the rim of the basket.

Light cavalry could chase down a retreating chariot while covered with a shield, often made from wicker, leather or rawhide. The Roman Empire employed North African horsemen for this, and used them during fighting with raiding tribes, the Macedonian Wars, and the Roman–Parthian Wars. Successor states did the same against raids, and the more ambitious chased raiding parties all the way back to their hideouts. Some did not bother for fear of ambush.

Eventually, one man, one horse became the rule due to the maneuverability of a less encumbered horse and the added expense of building and maintaining a chariot. Some chariot designs enabled a team to stop, unhook the horses, leave the chariot behind in a chosen spot and mount the horses to fight as cavalry.

If they had infantry along, the infantrymen could lock the wheels of multiple chariots thus freed as barricades, though this risked damage to the chariot itself. A solid axeblow to the wheelspokes can render a chariot useless if they are wooden. A spearman or an axeman could stand in the basket for added height to strike at oncoming enemies more effectively, or a foot archer or slinger if they have shield-bearers in front. Armies invading the area later on often came from regions where chariotry had already been abandoned.

Watchtowers were common.

The hot climate and the centuries of upheaval during and after the collapse of western Roman central authority meant the shortest-lived successor states did not have an opportunity to develop heavy cavalry along the lines of Byzantine cataphracts. Camels, mules and other pack animals were used for logistics. Heat made water sources of great importance.

Tribal warfare continued on the Algerian Desert. Some tribes voluntarily accepted Islam when they met to trade. Larger, more organized expeditions southward encountered indigenous west African cultures, formed new trade links, drew maps which circulated farther north, and wrote down observations. They gradually spread cattle and the horse, although many tribes already had one or both.

Dynasty fought dynasty. Rebels rose up. Some men went north to the coast or to islands in the Mediterranean and took up piracy, or to help hold the frontier in Iberia. A few ships occasionally went east to fight in wars against the Byzantine Empire. They learned to avoid ships carrying Greek fire. Trade with states to the east brought Damascus steel weapons.

== Ottoman Algeria ==
By the time of Ottoman Dynasty rule, black powder weapons had already become a common feature of warfare around the Mediterranean world. Swords, such as the Nimcha, were still in use. Helmet wearing varied considerably, and many men who could afford a good helmet still did not wear one, a turban providing sufficient protection against one or two swordblows that might get past their guard, as well as shade from the sun, while being cooler especially if watered down and with more free airflow than steel permits.

Horses remained valuable. A horseman could ride to enemy lines, throw his javelins, if any, fire a flintlock or a matchlock, hack away with a sword, then ride off before getting bogged down or exhausted. Muskets also made helmets more or less pointless. A stout metal shield could help cover a man and his neighbor in line from musketfire at extreme range, but was so heavy that most men who could afford both chose a musket for its range and didn't bother with the bulk and weight of a shield.

Some armies would give slaves metal shields to cover the fighting men from enemy fire, but no weapons for fear of mutiny, and sent them back from the line to guard the commander if hand-to-hand combat broke out. In this way, some slaves noted for bravery were set free. Contrary to European stereotype, not all were Black Guards. Some came from Sub-Saharan Africa, while others came from Europe. A few are noted to have accepted Islam, much like Jan Janzsoon, though not often so well-known.

Naval engagements during this period saw new ships like the caravel, the galeass, the galleon, the frigate, and the ship of the line. With sailpower more commonly driving ships on the open ocean, navigation beyond shore became more important. Cannon became more powerful. Island bases and coastal forts retained strategic significance and fighting and military planning reflected this reality. Port cities were often guarded by a fort at each end, with wall-shielded docks ready for defending forces' fighters to board their ships and sally forth, or to provide cover if enemy fire became too heavily concentrated. European powers built star forts to better withstand cannon fire. Observers in North Africa mirrored this trend. Kasbahs and other structures were rebuilt with thicker walls and more embrasures, often made from mudbrick, both to better support the weight of more cannon and provide better protection behind cover for the gun crews while loading and for other defenders, and to avoid shattering as some types of stone walls do under besieging cannon bombardment. Powder magazines were covered with reinforced roofs or moved underground to prevent heated shot or other heat sources from igniting them. The Negro Fort defenders in Spanish Florida provide an example of why such precautions were needed. European raiders and rival Muslim states might spy on an Algerian fort, hoping to find an exposed magazine.

Pirates continued to operate in small oar-driven boats without fixed masts to give them away while coming up on shore or alongside larger vessels. Larger pirate vessels were also in use. Boarding parties swung on ropes to reach the target deck or rigging, or extended hook-ended planks to walk across, a boarding tactic in use since at least the time of the First Punic War. Ribbed planks or rope ladders offered a way up the sides of much steeper ships. Boarders could expect incoming swivel gun fire, and grapeshot loaded in heavier guns if the boarded vessel had time to raise the alarm.

== Barbary Wars ==
The First and Second Barbary Wars were a series of conflicts between the United States and the Barbary States in North Africa. At issue was the pirates' demand of tribute from American vessels in the Mediterranean. The United States paid taxes and rights fees to access the Mediterranean sea until the end of the Second Barbary War.

== French Conquest ==
Abd-el-Kader

France seized Algiers in 1830, using as justification an alleged insult to the French consul by the reigning Dey of Algiers. The conquest of Algeria by the French faced long and bitter opposition, led from 1832 to 1847 by the Algerian resistance leader Abd-el-Kader.

The French Army used scorched-earth tactics and there were heavy losses amongst the indigenous Kabyle and Arab peoples (estimated to have numbered about 2 million in 1830). It was not until 1857 that the country was physically occupied and complete pacification was not achieved until 1881. The conquest was not technically completed until the early 1900s when the last Tuareg were conquered and the Sahara came under full French control.

== French Army of Africa ==
The French Foreign Legion was established in 1831 by King Louis Philippe. The Legion was based in Algeria for 130 years, an experience which came to shape its character.

The French Army recruited extensively from the Berber and Arab peoples of Algeria throughout the period of French rule (1830–1962). Most were employed as infantry (Tirailleurs) and cavalry (Spahis). Algerian troops saw service in the Crimean War, Mexico, the Franco-Prussian War, various colonial campaigns in Africa, Tonkin and Syria, both World Wars, and the First Indochina War.

In addition to indigenous troops, the French Army raised regiments of Zouaves and Chasseurs d' Afrique for service in Algeria. Originally comprising French volunteers, these units were, after 1871, mostly drawn from French settlers in Algeria ("pieds-noirs"). As French citizens these Europeans had an obligation to undertake compulsory military service.

=== French conscription of Algerian subjects ===
In 1907, France began to investigate the possibility of conscripting Algerian subjects into the French military in order to reduce a disparity in manpower with Germany. In February 1912, France introduced a limited conscription of Muslim Algerians to augment the majority recruitment of volunteers. Based on the drawing of lots this provided an annual intake of 1,500 to 2,000 indigenous conscripts a year in peacetime.

=== World War I ===
Algerians fought in the French Army during World War I. A mixed division from Algeria of Muslim tirailleurs and French (pieds-noirs) zouaves was one of the first to be exposed to chemical warfare on the Western Front during the Second Battle of Ypres. An estimated 172,000 Algerian-born Muslims, both volunteers and conscripts, fought for France in World War I, of which nearly 43,000 died.

=== Between the Wars ===
While Algeria remained generally peaceful from 1919 to 1939, the French army conducted extensive campaigns to complete the occupation of both Morocco and Syria during this period. Algerian Tirailleurs and Spahis saw active service in both states.

=== World War II ===
During World War II, Algeria, along with the remainder of North Africa, was occupied by Nazi Germany. On November 8, 1942, the Allies launched the first major offensive of the war codenamed Operation Torch.

Allied Forces led by Dwight D. Eisenhower landed on the northern beaches and advanced south against an army of 60,000 German troops. The Allies retook Morocco along with Algeria, establishing the liberation of North Africa.

During the War, large numbers of both Muslim and European Algerians served with Free France. Algerian troops particularly distinguished themselves as part of the French Expeditionary Corps under General Alphonse Juin, during the Italian campaign of 1943 and the Allied invasion of southern France in 1944.

An estimated 134,000 Algerian-born soldiers were mobilized during World War II, of which 18,000 died while liberating Europe.

== War of Independence ==
The Algerian War of Independence was a series of uprisings and guerrilla warfare by Algerian Nationalists against the French administration and army, the pied-noir community of European descent, and pro-French Muslim militias (Harkis). During the war the French Fourth Republic collapsed and Charles de Gaulle established a new Republic. Algeria gained independence in 1962 with Ahmed Ben Bella as the first President. The conflict has had a lasting impact on France and Algeria because of the atrocities committed on both sides.

The nationalist National Liberation Army (NLA) (see below) came to number about 150,000 lightly armed troops by 1962, serving both in Algeria and beyond its borders. The bulk of actual fighting was carried out by varying numbers of "internal" irregular fighters who comprised six regional commands. While beaten in most direct clashes, notably after 1957, the poorly equipped and outnumbered internal forces were able to maintain an effective opposition to a French Army of nearly half a million troops, throughout an extended struggle that cost up to a million Algerian lives.

== New Algerian Army ==
The National Liberation Army (NLA) was created shortly after the Algerian rising began in 1954. It comprised both internal and external wings (the latter based in Tunisia and Morocco during the war). It was the well armed and trained external wing who made up the bulk of the new Armee Nationale Populaire (ANP) created in 1962. Only some 10,000 of the 50,000-60,000 who had fought in the internal forces were taken into the ANP while the remainder were demobilised.

The regular element of the Algerian People's National Army remained at a level of 60,000-70,000 after independence until 1969 when conscription was introduced. Most conscripts however were employed on non-military duties after doing their basic training.

Following the end of the Algerian War (1962) most of France's North African units were disbanded. A reduced Foreign Legion and one regiment each of Spahis, Tirailleurs and Chasseurs d'Afrique remain in the modern French Army,

== Sand War ==
The Sand War occurred along the Algerian-Moroccan border in October 1963, and was a Moroccan attempt to claim the Tindouf and the Bechar. Border skirmishes escalated into a full-blown confrontation, with intense fighting around the oasis towns. The Organisation of African Unity eventually managed to arrange a formal cease-fire and a peace agreement was then made.

Tensions between the two countries have continued, arising primarily from both political differences and outstanding border issues in the southern Sahara. There have however been no further actual clashes.

== 1967 and Yom Kippur Wars ==
Algeria sent a battalion of Algerian Land Forces infantry and a squadron of Algerian Air Force MiG-21s to Egypt during the 1967 Six-Day War with Israel. While the troops did not see active service, reportedly six MiGs were lost.

The 1973 Yom Kippur War was the fourth major conflict between Israel and the neighboring Arab States. Like many other Arab States, Algeria contributed to the fighting in the Yom Kippur War. The Algerian government sent squadrons of fighters and bombers along with an armored brigade.

== Algerian Civil War ==
The Algerian Civil War was a bloody conflict between the Algerian government and various Islamist militias. The conflict lasted from 1991 to 2002 when the Islamic Salvation Army surrendered to the government but minor skirmishes still continue in parts of the country.

During the conflict a series of massacres took place. The Armed Islamic Group has claimed responsibility for many of them. For others no group has claimed responsibility. In addition to generating a widespread sense of fear, these massacres and the ensuing flight of population have resulted in serious depopulation in the worst-affected areas.

== References and notes ==
- World Navies
- "World Armies": John Keegan; ISBN 0-333-17236-1
- "A Savage War of Peace - Algeria 1954-1962": Alastair Horne; ISBN 0-670-61964-7
