= International rankings of Algeria =

These are the international rankings of Algeria

== International rankings ==
Organization	Survey	Ranking
Institute for Economics and Peace	Global Peace Index	109 out of 163
United Nations Development Programme	Human Development Index	83 out of 182
Transparency International	Corruption Perceptions Index	108 out of 180
World Economic Forum	Global Competitiveness Report	83 out of 133
World Intellectual Property Organization	Global Innovation Index, 2026	111 out of 139
