= Star Aviation =

Algerian airline

Stars Aviation
IATA	ICAO	Call sign
?	DST	Star Aviation
- Founded: 2001
- Commenced operations: 2001
- Hubs: Oued Irara–Krim Belkacem Airport
- Secondary hubs: Houari Boumedienne Airport
- Fleet size: 12 (+ 1 orders)
- Headquarters: Hassi Messaoud, Algeria

Star Aviation is an airline based at Hassi Messaoud, Algeria. It operates domestic services and its main base is Oued Irara–Krim Belkacem Airport, Hassi Messaoud.

== History ==
Star Aviation is the aircraft operation of the RedMed Group (a private company providing a wide range of logistics and other services to companies in the oil and gas sector in the Hassi Messaoud area). Since beginning operations in 2001, there have been no fatalities as a result of Star Aviation operations.

== Fleet ==
The Star Aviation fleet includes the following aircraft:

- 1 Pilatus PC-6
- 3 De Havilland Canada DHC-6 Twin Otter (at August 2019)
- 2 Beechcraft 1900
- 1 Cessna 525A
- 2 Cessna C560 XLS+
