= Timeline of the Algerian Civil War =

The Algerian Civil War was an armed conflict in Algeria between the Algerian Government and multiple Islamist rebel groups, sparked by a military overthrow of the newly elected Islamist government. The war lasted from December 1991 until February 2002, though in the south of the country an Islamist insurgency remains ongoing.

== 1991 ==
- November 27 – Two Islamists who had fought in the Afghan War, Aïssa Messaoudi and Abderrahmane Dahane, attack a border post at Guemmar, killing soldiers and foreshadowing the war to come.
- December 26 – First round of parliamentary elections; the Islamic Salvation Front (FIS) wins 188 of the 232 (of 429) seats decided on the first ballot, putting it far ahead of any other party. The Socialist Forces Front (FFS) wins 25 seats, while the ex-ruling party, the National Liberation Front (FLN), wins just 15.

== 1992 ==
- January 3 – The second round of Algeria's general elections is cancelled. President Chadli Bendjedid forced to resign.
- January 11 – The Military Takes Over and cancelles the electoral process to prevent the formation of an Islamic state in Algeria.
- January 14 – It is announced that a military-backed High Council of State (HCE) is taking over.
- January 16 – The exiled ex-independence fighter Mohammed Boudiaf returns and is given leadership of the HCE.
- January 22 – Leading FIS member Abdelkader Hachani arrested.
- February 9 – State of emergency declared.
- March 4 – FIS dissolved by government decree.
- June 29 – Mohammed Boudiaf assassinated; his role is filled by Ali Kafi.
- July 12 – FIS leaders Abassi Madani and Ali Belhadj sentenced to 12 years' imprisonment.
- August 26 – Algiers airport bombed; 9 deaths, 128 injured.

== 1993 ==
- March 27 – Algeria cuts diplomatic relations with Sudan and Iran, accusing them of supporting terrorism in Algeria.
- May 26 – Anti-Islamist writer Tahar Djaout attacked by assassins; he died of his wounds shortly after, on June 2.
- August 22 – Ex-Prime Minister Kasdi Merbah assassinated. The government accuses the Armed Islamic Group (GIA), while FIS accuses the government.
- December 1 – Deadline beyond which the GIA had stated that it would consider all foreigners remaining in Algeria as targets.

== 1994 ==
- January 30 – Liamine Zeroual given presidency of the High Council of State.
- March 10 – Tazoult prison escape; guerrillas apparently attacked the prison and freed about 1000 prisoners. On the same day, the playwright Abdelkader Alloula was assassinated.
- August 27 – Moroccan border closed.
- September 29 – Rai singer Cheb Hasni assassinated.
- November 14 – Alleged Berrouaghia prison massacre.
- December 24 – GIA hijacks Air France Flight 8969.
- December 27 – main foreign airlines stop flights to Algeria.

== 1995 ==
- January 14 - Representatives of FIS, FFS, and FLN (and some smaller parties) sign the Sant'Egidio platform (text) in Rome, seeing it as a blueprint for ending the conflict. The Algerian government found its provisions unacceptable, and did not sign.
- February 21 - Serkadji prison mutiny; 4 guards and 96 prisoners killed in a day and a half, following an escape attempt and prison mutiny in a high-security prison for people charged with or convicted of terrorism.
- November 16 - Liamine Zeroual elected president.

== 1996 ==
- May 21 - The seven French Trappist monks of Tibhirine are beheaded after having been abducted on March 27.
- July 16 - GIA leader Djamel Zitouni killed by the rival LIDD in an ambush. Antar Zouabri takes over.

== 1997 ==
- January 5 - Benachour massacre of 5 January 1997 16 civilians are killed
- April 3 - Thalit massacre; all but 1 of the 53 inhabitants of Thalit are killed.
- April 22 - Haouch Khemisti massacre; 93 villagers killed.
- April 23 - Omaria massacre in Algeria; 42 villagers killed.
- June 5 - Parliamentary elections. The newly created pro-government Democratic National Rally (RND) comes first, with 156/380 seats, followed by the Islamist Movement of Society for Peace (MSP) (69) and the former single party FLN (62); these top three form a coalition government. Zeroual remains president.
- June 16 - Dairat Labguer massacre; some 50 people killed.
- July 27 - Si Zerrouk massacre; about 50 people killed.
- August 3 - Oued El-Had and Mezouara massacre; 40-76 villagers killed.
- August 20 - Souhane massacre; over 60 people killed, 15 kidnapped.
- August 26 - Beni-Ali massacre; 60-100 people killed.
- August 29 - Rais massacre; over 98 (and possibly up to 400) people killed.
- September 1 - FIS leader Abassi Madani moved from jail to house arrest. The more radical Ali Belhadj remains in jail.
- September 5 - Beni-Messous massacre; over 87 killed.
- September 19 - Guelb El-Kebir massacre; 53 killed.
- September 21 - The AIS declares a unilateral ceasefire.
- September 22 - Bentalha massacre; over 200 villagers killed.
- October 12 - Sidi Daoud massacre; 43 killed at a fake roadblock.
- November 27 - Second Souhane massacre; 25 killed.
- December 24 - Sid El-Antri massacre; 50-100 villagers killed.
- December 30 - Wilaya of Relizane massacres of December 30, 1997: up to 400 people are killed in four villages in the wilaya of Relizane.

== 1998 ==
- January 4 - Wilaya of Relizane massacres of 4 January 1998; over 170 killed in three remote villages.
- January 11 - Sidi-Hamed massacre; over 100 people killed.
- March 26 - Oued Bouaicha massacre; 52 people killed with axes and knives, 32 of them babies under the age of 2.
- June 25 - Anti-religious Kabyle singer Matoub Lounes assassinated.
- September 14 - Al-Qaeda in the Islamic Maghreb (GSPC) forms as a faction splits from GIA over its massacre policy.
- December 8 - Tadjena massacre; 81 villagers killed.

== 1999 ==
- April 15 - Abdelaziz Bouteflika elected president, all other candidates having withdrawn alleging fraud.
- June 5 - The Islamic Salvation Army (AIS), the FIS's armed wing, agrees in principle to disband and starts negotiating for an amnesty for its fighters.
- November 22 - Senior FIS member Abdelkader Hachani assassinated.

== 2000 ==
- January 11 - AIS concludes its negotiations with the government for an amnesty and disbands.

== 2001 ==
- September 23 - George W. Bush’s Executive Order 13224 freezes assets of the GIA and GSPC as terrorist groups after the September 11 attacks in the United States.

== 2002 ==
- February 8 - Antar Zouabri, GIA leader, is killed in his hometown of Boufarik. (His death had been incorrectly announced on previous occasions.)

== 2003 ==
- July 2 - FIS leaders Abassi Madani and Ali Belhadj released, having served 12-year sentences.
- October 23 - GSPC leader Nabil Sahraoui (having taken over from Hassan Hattab) announces that his group "strongly and fully support Osama bin Laden's jihad against the heretic America as well as we support our brothers in Afghanistan, the Philippines, and Chechnya".

== 2004 ==
- June 20 - Government announces killing of GSPC head Nabil Sahraoui. He is succeeded by Abou Mossaab Abdelouadoud.
- July - GIA leader Rachid Abou Tourab killed, according to an interior ministry statement in January 2005.
