= List of terrorist incidents in 1997 =

This is a timeline of incidents in 1997 that have been labelled as "terrorism" and are not believed to have been carried out by a government or its forces (see state terrorism and state-sponsored terrorism).

== Guidelines ==
- To be included, entries must be notable (have a stand-alone article) and described by a consensus of reliable sources as "terrorism".
- List entries must comply with the guidelines outlined in the manual of style under MOS:TERRORIST.
- Casualty figures in this list are the total casualties of the incident including immediate casualties and later casualties (such as people who succumbed to their wounds long after the attacks occurred).
- Casualties listed are the victims. Perpetrator casualties are listed separately (e.g. x (+y) indicate that x victims and y perpetrators were killed/injured).
- Casualty totals may be underestimated or unavailable due to a lack of information. A figure with a plus (+) sign indicates that at least that many people have died (e.g. 10+ indicates that at least 10 people have died) – the actual toll could be considerably higher. A figure with a plus (+) sign may also indicate that over that number of people are victims.
- If casualty figures are 20 or more, they will be shown in **bold**. In addition, figures for casualties more than 50 will also be **underlined**.
- Incidents are limited to one per location per day. If multiple attacks occur in the same place on the same day, they will be merged into a single incident.
- In addition to the guidelines above, the table also includes the following categories:

0 people were killed/injured by the incident.
1–19 people were killed/injured by the incident.
20–49 people were killed/injured by the incident.
50–99 people were killed/injured by the incident.
100+ people were killed/injured by the incident.

== List ==
Date	Type	Dead	Injured	Location	Details	Perpetrators	Part of
23 February	Shooting	1 (+1 attacker)	6	New York City, United States	69-year-old Palestinian immigrant Ali Hassan Abu Kamal opened fire on the observation deck of the Empire State Building, killing a Danish musician and injuring 6 other people before committing suicide. 10 years after the attack, Kamal's daughter revealed that her father committed the shooting in hopes of influencing the U.S. to support Palestine rather than Israel.	Ali Hassan Abu Kamal	Israeli–Palestinian conflict
25 February	Bombings	9	74	Ürümqi, China	Uyghyr separatists bombed three buses, killing 9 people, including 3 children, and injuring 74. Another bomb was found at the main railway station but was defused. The bombings were a response to the Ghulja incident in which the Chinese army killed several Uyghur protestors.	Uyghur separatists	Xinjiang conflict
13 March	Mass shooting	7	6	Island of Peace, Israeli-Jordanian border	Ahmed Daqamseh, a Jordanian soldier opened fire on a group of Israeli schoolgirls, killing 7 and wounding 5, as well as 1 teacher	Ahmed Daqamseh	Israeli–Palestinian conflict
21 March	Suicide bombing	3	46	Tel Aviv, Israel	A Hamas suicide bomber detonated at a sidewalk café, killing 3 and wounding 46.	Hamas	Israeli–Palestinian conflict
21 March	Massacre	7	Several	Budgam, India	Seven Kashmiri Pandit civilians are killed and several more are injured by Islamist militants	Islamists	Insurgency in Jammu and Kashmir
4 April	Massacre	52	Unknown	Thalit, Algeria	Fifty-two out of the 53 inhabitants were killed by having their throats cut during a 12-hour rampage. The homes of the villagers were burned down afterwards.	GIA	Algerian Civil War
22 April	Raid, shootout	3 (+14 attackers)		Lima, Peru	A team of 142 soldiers raided the Japanese embassy where the MRTA were holding several hostages. Two soldiers, one hostage and 14 rebels were killed in a raid.	MRTA	Internal conflict in Peru
22 April	Massacre	93	Unknown	Bougara, Algeria	The Haouch Khemisti massacre took place before dawn on April 22, 1997, in the Algerian village of Haouch Mokhfi Khemisti, some 25 km south of Algiers near Bougara. An armed group killed 93 villagers in a 3 hour long attack because they refused to "collaborate", since armed groups depended on the aid of citizens who provide food, money and other necessities for their survival. The bodies were found decapitated.	GIA	Algerian Civil War
23 April	Massacre	42	Unknown	El Omaria, Algeria	The Omaria massacre took place on 23 April 1997 in the Algerian village of El Omaria near Médéa, south of Algiers. Attackers armed with knives, sabers, and guns killed 42 people – including 17 women and 3 babies – in 3 hours, mutilating and sometimes burning the bodies. A pregnant woman was cut open, and her baby hacked apart.	GIA	Algerian Civil War
16 June	Massacre	50	Unknown	Daïat Labguer, Algeria	About 50 people were killed by some 30 guerrillas, who also kidnapped women, killed the livestock, and stole valuables. Five days earlier, another 17 had been killed at a village some 5 km away. The massacre was attributed to Islamist groups such as the Armed Islamic Group.	GIA	Algerian Civil War
15–20 July	Massacre	~30	0	Mapiripán, Meta, Colombia	The Mapiripán Massacre was a mass murder of civilians that was carried out by the Autodefensas Unidas de Colombia, a right-wing paramilitary group.	Autodefensas Unidas de Colombia	Colombian conflict
27 July	Massacre	~50	Unknown	Si Zerrouk, Algeria	On the afternoon of 27 July 1997, the electricity went out. That night, a number of guerrillas armed with shotguns, knives, and sabres (30 according to The Economist, 100 according to Liberte) stormed into the area by night and started breaking into homes and cutting the residents' throats, killing men, women, and babies, and burning some victims alive. They also blew up their houses. About 50 people (most papers reported 47; Le Matin reported 58) were killed.	GIA	Algerian Civil War
30 July	Suicide bombings	16 (+2)	178	Jerusalem, Israel	Two suicide bombers detonated at Mahane Yehuda open-air market, killing 16 and injuring 148.	Hamas	Israeli–Palestinian conflict
2 August	Massacre	100–200	100	Arib, Algeria	The Oued El-Had and Mezouara massacre took place on August 2, 1997. This massacre occurred between two villages near Arib in the wilaya of Tipaza and Ain Defla, Algeria. Around 100 people were killed as a result of the massacre. This massacre was one of the bloodiest since the start of terrorism in Algeria. Algeria-Watch's timeline describes them as strange guerrillas with shaven heads and eyebrows, carrying flags emblazoned "al-ghadhibun 'ala Allah" (Angry at God).	GIA (suspected)	Algerian Civil War
21 August	Massacre	64	Unknown	Souhane, Algeria	The largest of the Souhane massacres took place in the small mountain town of Souhane (about 25 km south of Algiers, between Larbaa and Tablat) on 20–21 August 1997. 64 people were killed, and 15 women kidnapped.	GIA	Algerian Civil War
26 August	Massacre	64–100	Unknown	Beni Ali, Algeria	The Beni Ali massacre took place in the mountain hamlet of Beni Ali, 40 miles (64 km) south of Algiers near Chrea, on 26 August 1997. Sixty-four (according to The New York Times and CNN) or 100 people (according to Amnesty International) were killed in a terrorist attack.	GIA	Algerian Civil War
29 August	Massacre	98–800	120	Rais, Algeria	The hooded attackers arrived about 1 am in trucks and cars, armed with shotguns, knives, axes, and bombs. They continued killing the village's men, women, children, and even animals until dawn (about 6 am), cutting throats and taking the time to burn corpses; young women, however, were abducted instead of being killed. In some cases, they left severed heads on doorsteps. They mutilated and stole from the dead, and committed atrocities against pregnant women. They burned and bombed some houses. The villagers tried to flee or hide. Army units stayed outside the village, shooting at fleeing villagers, but not attempting to enter the village until after the attackers, carrying away some 20 young women, left at dawn.	GIA	Algerian Civil War
4 September	Bombing	1	11	Havana, Cuba	An Italian tourist named Fabio di Celmo was killed in a bomb blast at a hotel. This was one of a series of bombings of hotels in 1997. Anti-Castro rebels led by Luis Posada Carriles were convicted of the attack.	Luis Posada Carriles; Anti-Castro rebels	
5–6 September	Massacre	87–150	Unknown	Beni Messous, Algeria	At about 10 pm on September 5, 1997, about 50 howling men, some of them dressed in military forms, arrived in Sidi Youssef, wielding knives and machetes, and started breaking into houses and killing those within. The victims screamed for help and banged pots and pans to alert their neighbors. Security forces did not arrive until 1 am, despite being stationed close by. The terrorists killed at least 87 people that night, according to the Associated Press; no official death toll was issued, and two political parties, FFS and HMS, claimed about 150 were killed, whereas Daikha Dridi reports 53. It was followed by a second night of killing the next day which reportedly left another 45 dead.	GIA	Algerian Civil War
18 September	Bombing	0	29	Mostar, Bosnia and Herzegovina	The attack was carried out by al-Qaeda-connected Islamic extremists, and targeted Croatian civilians and policemen as retribution against the Croatian Defence Council (HVO), which had fought Muslim forces for control of the city during the Bosnian War. It remains the most serious terrorist attack in post-war Bosnia and Herzegovina.	Al-Qaeda in Bosnia and Herzegovina	
20 September	Massacre	53	Unknown	Guelb El-Kbir, Algeria	The Guelb El-Kebir massacre took place in the village of Guelb el-Kebir, near Beni Slimane, in the Algerian province of Medea, on 20 September 1997. 53 people were killed by attackers that were not immediately identified, though the attack was similar to others carried out by Islamic groups opposed to the Algerian government.	GIA	Algerian Civil War
23 September	Massacre	200+	Unknown	Bentalha, Algeria	On the night of 22 September at 11:30 p.m., explosions occurred in the Hai el-Djilali neighborhood in the southwest of Bentalha. Attackers infiltrated the area from the orange groves to the southeast of the neighborhood. They systematically went from house to house, resulting in the deaths of numerous residents. Eyewitness accounts reported that the attackers were armed with various weapons and engaged in violent acts. The event led to widespread devastation and loss of life.	GIA	Algerian Civil War
15 October	Bombing	15	105	Colombo, Sri Lanka	An LTTE bomb exploded at the World Trade Centre, killing 15 and injuring hundreds.	LTTE	Sri Lankan Civil War
22 October	Massacre	15	Unknown	Ituango, Colombia	The AUC assassinates 15 people in the El Aro Massacre and causes the forced displacement and the dispossession of lands of several families	AUC	Colombian conflict
17 November	Massacre	62		Deir el-Bahari, Egypt	6 Islamist gunmen massacre 58 foreign tourists and 4 Egyptians at the Temple of Hatshepsut	al-Gama'a al-Islamiyya	Terrorism in Egypt
21 December	Shooting, Clashes	11	18 kidnapped	Patascoy, Colombia	FARC militants attack an army base near the border with Ecuador. 11 soldiers killed and 18 kidnapped.	FARC	Colombian conflict
22 December	Massacre	45		Acteal, Mexico	45 members of the indigenous pacifist froup Las Abejas are massacred at a church by a paramilitary group called "Mascara Roja" (Red Mask)	Mascara Roja militants	Chiapas conflict
23–24 December	Massacre	48–117	Unknown	Sidi-El Antri, Algeria	The Sid El-Antri massacre took place on the night of 23–24 December 1997 in two small villages near Tiaret, Algeria. The death toll is unclear; Reuters cites "at least 80", or 48 according to the government. Le Jeune Independent reported 117 people were killed and 11 abducted by terrorists, and a timeline gives 53 (including 15 children) killed in Sidi el-Antri (or Sidi el-Antar, Sidi Lamri) and 28 in Shari.	GIA	Algerian Civil War
27 December	Shooting	1	0	Belfast, Northern Ireland	Irish National Liberation Army (INLA) prisoners shot dead Loyalist Volunteer Force (LVF) leader and fellow prisoner Billy Wright inside the maximum-security Maze Prison.	INLA	The Troubles
