= 1997 in Algeria =

- Decades: 1970s; 1980s; 1990s; 2000s; 2010s
- See also: History of Algeria; List of years in Algeria

Events from the year 1997 in Algeria.

== Incumbents ==
- President: Liamine Zéroual
- Prime Minister: Ahmed Ouyahia

== Events ==
- April 3–4 – Thalit massacre
- April 21 – Haouch Khemisti massacre
- June 5 – Algerian legislative elections, 1997
- June 16 – Dairat Labguer massacre
- July 27 – Si-Zerrouk massacre
- August 3 – Oued El-Had and Mezouara massacre
- August 20–21 – Souhane massacre
- August 26 – Beni-Ali massacre
- August 29 – Rais massacre
- September 5–6 – Beni-Messous massacre
- September 19 – Guelb El-Kebir massacre
- September 22 – Bentalha massacre
- December 23–24 – Sid El-Antri massacre
- December 30 – Wilaya of Relizane massacres of 30 December 1997
