= List of conflicts in Algeria =

Map showing the present-day location of the People's Democratic Republic of Algeria within North Africa.

This is a list of conflicts in Algeria arranged chronologically from ancient to modern times. This list includes both nationwide and international types of war, including (but not limited to) the following: wars of independence, liberation wars, colonial wars, undeclared wars, proxy wars, territorial disputes, and world wars. Also listed might be any battle that occurred within the territory of what is today known as the, "People's Democratic Republic of Algeria" but was itself only part of an operation of a campaign of a theater of a war. There may also be periods of violent civil unrest listed, such as: riots, shootouts, spree killings, massacres, terrorist attacks, and civil wars. The list might also contain episodes of: human sacrifice, mass suicide, massacres, and genocides.

== Ancient times ==
=== Carthaginian Empire ===
Animated map showing the possession changes of both the Roman Republic and the Carthaginian Empire during the three Punic Wars, from 264 BCE to 146 BCE. Possessions of the Carthaginian Empire. Possessions of the Roman Republic.

- 264 BCE — 146 BCE Punic Wars

=== Kingdom of Numidia ===
- 112 BCE — 106 BCE Jugurthine War
  - 111 BCE — 104 BCE Battle of Thala
  - 110 BCE Battle of Suthul
  - 108 BCE Battle of the Muthul

=== Roman province of Africa ===
- May 430 CE The Vandal Kingdom laid siege to the walled city of Hippo Regius.
- October 431 CE Hippo Regius fell to the Vandals.
- 439 CE Genseric chose to break the treaty between the Vandals and the Roman Empire when he invaded the province of Africa Proconsularis.

== Medieval times ==
=== Vandal Kingdom ===
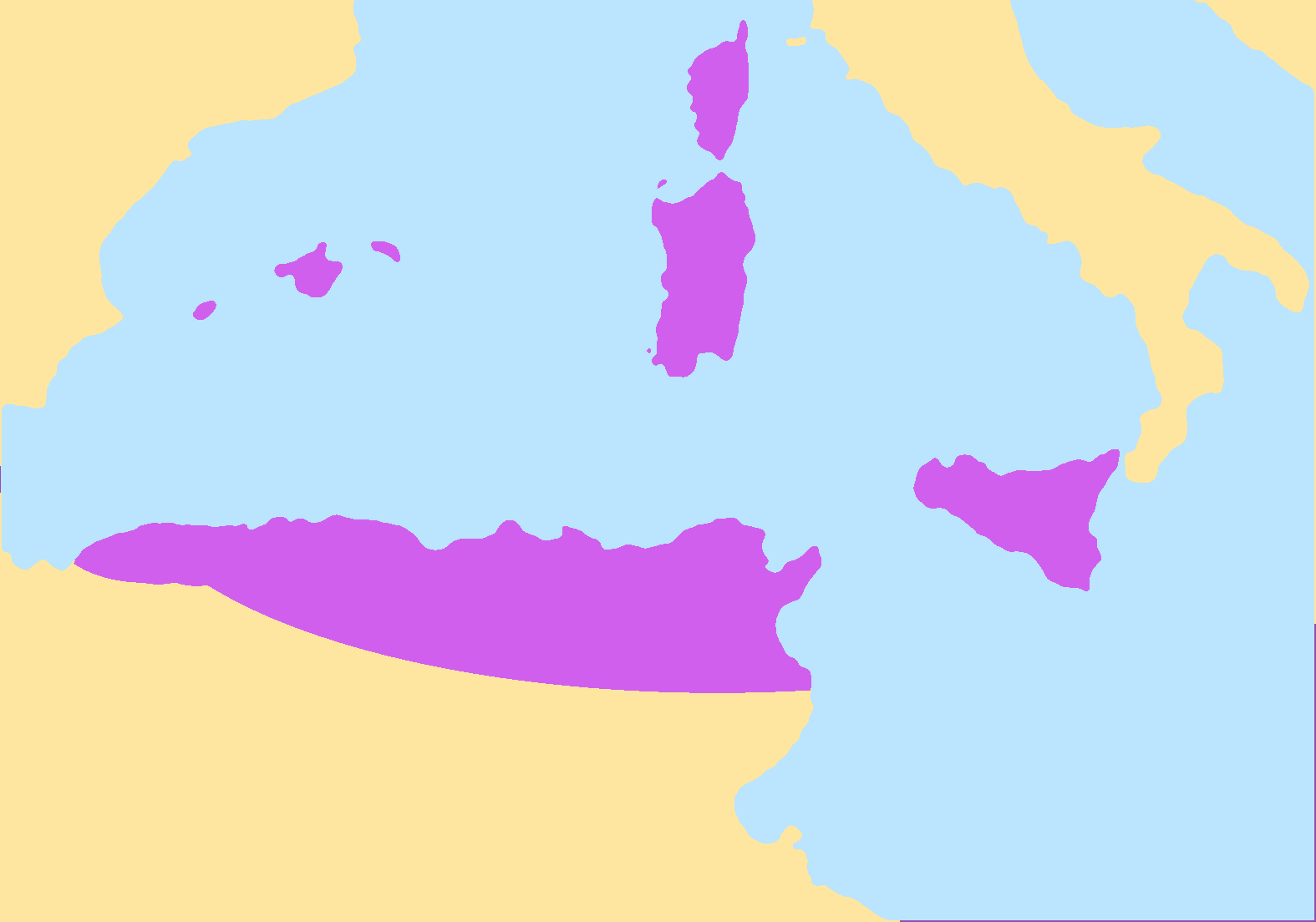
Map showing the Vandal Kingdom at its greatest extent c. 476.

- June 533 CE — March 534 CE Vandalic War

=== Byzantine Praetorian prefecture of Africa ===
- 534 CE — 577 CE The Moorish Wars
  - 534 CE First Moorish Uprising
  - 544 CE Second Moorish Uprising

=== Byzantine Exarchate of Africa ===
- 647 CE — 709 CE Muslim conquest of North Africa

=== Rashidun Caliphate ===
Animated map showing the expansion of the Rashidun Caliphate under the first four caliphs (Abu Bakr, Umar, Uthman, and Ali, ruling for twenty-nine years from 632 CE — 661 CE) following the death of Muhammad and leading up to the First Fitna (from 658 CE — 661 CE.) The divided phase relates to the reign of the caliph Ali. Strongholds of the Rashidun Caliphate. Vassal states of the Rashidun Caliphate. Regions under the control of Muawiyah I during the First Fitna (from 656 CE — 658 CE.) Regions under the control of Amr ibn al-As during the First Fitna (from 658 CE — 661 CE.)

- 647 CE — 709 CE Muslim conquest of North Africa
- 656 CE — 661 CE First Fitna

=== Umayyad Caliphate ===
- 680 CE — 692 CE Second Fitna
- 744 CE — 746 CE Third Fitna

=== Abbasid Caliphate ===
- 809 CE — 827 CE Fourth Fitna

=== Zirid and Hammadid emirates ===
- Hilalian invasion of North Africa

=== Almoravid Empire ===
- 1053 CE — 1080 CE Almoravid conquest of Northern Africa

=== Almohad Caliphate ===
- 1160 CE All of Ifriqiya was conquered and annexed by the Almohad Caliphate.

=== Zayyanid Kingdom ===
- 1235 CE — 1248 CE Zayyanid–Almohad wars
- 1299 CE — 1307 Siege of Tlemcen
- 1313 CE Zayyanid conquest of Algiers
- 1326 CE Siege of Bejaia
- 1329 CE Battle of Er Rias and Conquest of Ifriqiya
- 1335 CE — 1337 CE Siege of Tlemcen
- 1366 CE Béjaïa expedition
- 1501 CE Battle of Mers-el-Kébir (1501)
- 1505 CE Capture of Mers-el-Kébir by Spain
- 1507 CE Battle of Mers-el-Kébir (1507)
- 1509 CE Spanish conquest of Oran
- 1510 CE Siege of Algiers
- 1510 CE Siege of Mostaganem
- 1518 CE Campaign of Tlemcen (1518)
- 1535 CE Spanish expedition to Tlemcen (1535)
- 1543 CE Spanish Campaign to Tlemcen and Abu Zayyan III reconquest
- 1551 CE Campaign of Tlemcen (1551)
- 1557 CE Campaign of Tlemcen (1557)

== Modern times ==
=== Regency of Algiers ===
A map showing the administrative divisions of the Regency of Algiers

- 1516 CE Capture of Algiers
- 1518 CE Fall of Tlemcen
- 1529 CE Capture of the Peñón of Algiers
- 1541 CE Algiers expedition (1541)
- 1552 CE Tuggurt Expedition
- 1553 CE Battle of Velez
- 1556 CE Siege of Oran
- 1558 CE Expedition to Mostaganem
- 1563 CE Siege of oran
- 1563 CE Sieges Mers El Kébir
- 1627 CE Tunisian-Algerian war
- 1664 CE Djidjelli expedition
- 1681 CE — 1688 CE French-Algerian War 1681–88
- Conflicts between Hadj Chabane and Moulay Ismael
  - 1692 CE Battle of Moulouya
  - 1693 CE Siege of Oran
- 1699 CE — 1702 CE Maghrebi war
  - 1699 CE — 1700 CE Mascara campaign (1699-1700)
  - 1699 CE — 1700 CE Constantine campaign (1699-1700)
  - 1700 CE Battle of Jouami' al-Ulama
  - 1701 CE Battle of Chelif
- 1705 CE Algerian-Tunisian War
- 1707 CE Oran Expedition
- 1707 — 1708 CE Siege of Oran
- 1732 CE Conquest of oran
- 1735 CE Algerian-Tunisian War
- 1756 CE Algerian-Tunisian war
- 1769 CE — 1772 CE Danish-Algerian War
- 1775 CE — 1785 CE Spanish-Algerian war
  - 1775 CE Invasion of Algiers
  - 1783 CE Bombardment of Algiers
  - 1784 CE Bombardment of Algiers
- 1790 CE — 1792 CE Siege of Oran
- 1807 CE Algerian-Tunisian war
- 1815 CE Second Barbary Wars
- 1816 CE Bombardment of Algiers
- 1830 CE Invasion of Algiers
  - Disembarkement at Sidi Fredj
  - Battle of Staouéli
  - Battle of Sidi Khalef
  - Siege of Bordj Moulay Hassan

=== Emirate of Abdelkader ===
- 1832 CE Battle of Kheng Nettah
- 1835 CE Battle of Sig, Battle of Macta, Battle of Mascara
- 1836 CE Battle of Habrah, Battle of Tlemcen, Battle of Sikkak
- 1837 CE Battle of Reghaia, Expedition of the Col des Beni Aïcha, First Battle of Boudouaou, Battle of Somah, Battle of Dellys
- 1839 CE Battle of Mitijda
- 1840 CE Battle of Mazagran
- 1842 CE Battle of Beni Mered
- 1843 CE Battle of Smala
- 1844 CE Second Battle of Dellys
- 1845 CE Battle of Sidi Brahim
- 1846 CE Battle of Issers
- 1847 CE Battle of Oued Aslaf, Battle of Argueddin

=== Beylik of Constantine ===
- 1832 CE Battle of Bône
- 1833 CE 1st Battle of Bejaia
- 1835 CE 2nd Battle of Bejaia
- 1836 CE Battle of Constantine
- 1837 CE Siege of Constantine
- 1842 CE Battle of Ain Roumel
- 1842 CE Battle of Djbel Bou Taleb

=== French Département of Alger ===
Animated map showing both the growth and decline of the French colonial empire from 1550 CE — 2007 CE.

- 1830 CE — 1903 CE French conquest of Algeria
- 1850 CE –- 1871 CE Taiping Rebellion
- 1851 CE Bombardment of Salé
- 1853 CE –- 1856 CE Crimean War
- 1871 CE Mokrani revolt
- 1881 CE French conquest of Tunisia

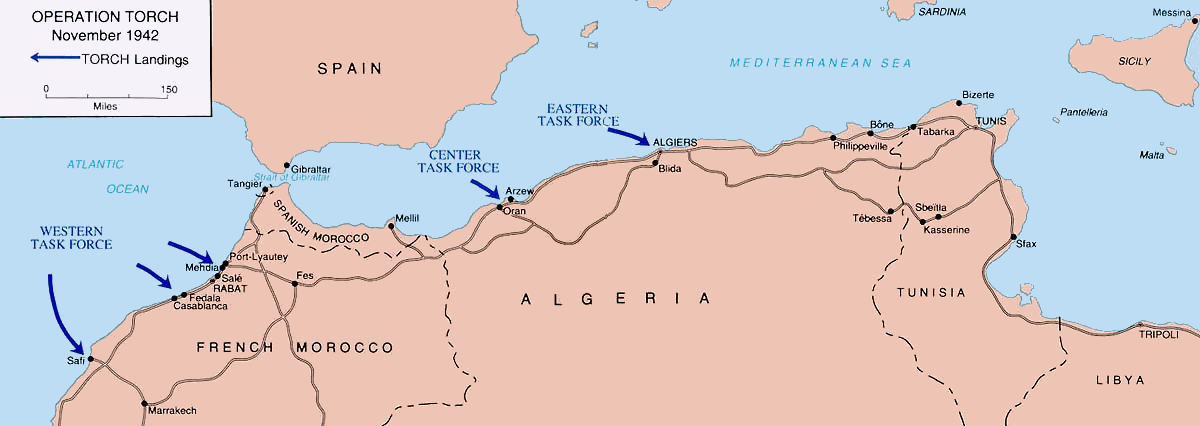
A map showing the Allied landings on Algeria during Operation Torch in 1942 CE.

=== Vichy France ===
- 1 September 1939 CE — 2 September 1945 CE Second World War
  - 10 June 1940 CE — 2 May 1945 CE Mediterranean and Middle East theatre of World War II
    - 10 June 1940 CE — 13 May 1943 CE North African Campaign
      - 8 November 1942 CE — 16 November 1942 CE Operation Torch
        - 8 November 1942 Operation Reservist
        - 8 November 1942 Operation Terminal
- 8 May 1945 CE Sétif and Guelma massacre

=== French Département of Algérie ===
- 1 November 1, 1954 CE — 19 March 1962 CE Algerian War of Independence
  - 1 November 1954 CE Toussaint Rouge
  - 18 January 1955 CE Battle of Douar Souadek
  - 18 January – 24 February 1955 CE Operation Véronique
  - September 1955 CE First battle of El Djorf
  - 20 August 1955 CE Battle of Philippeville
  - April 1956 CE — 1 October 1956 CE Operation Blue Bird
  - 30 September 1956 CE — 24 September 1957 CE Battle of Algiers
  - 23 May 1957 CE — 25 May 1957 CE Battle of Agounennda
  - 4–12 August 1957 Battle of Bouzegza
  - 21 January 1958 – 28 May 1958 Battle of the borders (Algerian war)

=== Provisional Government of the Algerian Republic ===
- 1 November 1954 CE — 19 March 1962 CE Algerian War of Independence
  - 13 May 1958 CE Crisis
  - 28–31 May 1958 CE Battle of Bab el Bekkouche
  - July 1959 CE — March 1960 CE Operation Jumelles
  - 21 April 1961 CE — 26 April 1961 CE Algiers putsch
  - 23 March 1962 CE — 6 April 1962 CE Battle of Bab El Oued

=== People's Democratic Republic of Algeria ===
- 25 September 1963 1963 CE Sand War
- 29 September 1963 1963 CE Socialist Forces Front rebellion in Algeria
- 10 March 1980 CE Berber Spring
- 5 October 1988 CE Riots
- 11 January 1992 1991 CE — 2 February 2002 CE Algerian Civil War
  - 3 April 1997 CE — 4 April 1997 CE Thalit massacre
  - 22 April 1997 CE Haouch Khemisti massacre
  - 16 June 1997 CE Daïat Labguer (M'sila) Massacre
  - 27 July 1997 CE Si Zerrouk massacre
  - 3 August 1997 CE Oued El-Had and Mezouara massacre
  - 20 August 1997 CE — August 21, 1,997 CE Souhane massacre
  - 26 August 1997 CE Beni Ali massacre
  - 28 August 1997 CE Rais massacre
  - 5 September 1997 CE - 6 September 1997 CE Beni Messous massacre
  - 19 September 1997 CE — 20 September 1997 CE Guelb El-Kebir massacre
  - 22 September 1997 CE — 23 September 1997 CE Bentalha massacre
  - 23 December 1997 CE — 24 December 1997 CE Sid El-Antri massacre
  - 30 December 1997 CE Wilaya of Relizane massacres
- 11 April 2002 CE — Present Insurgency in the Maghreb
  - 16–19 January 2013 CE In Amenas hostage crisis
- 28 December 2010 CE — 10 January 2012 CE Algerian protests

== See also ==
- List of wars involving Algeria
- Military of Algeria
- People's National Army
- Algerian National Navy
- Algerian Air Force
- Military history of Africa
- African military systems up until the year 1800 CE
- African military systems between the years 1800 CE and 1900 CE
- African military systems after the year 1900 CE
