= 1997 =

1997 in various calendars
- Gregorian calendar: 1997; MCMXCVII
- Ab urbe condita: 2750
- Armenian calendar: 1446; ԹՎ ՌՆԽԶ
- Assyrian calendar: 6747
- Baháʼí calendar: 153–154
- Balinese saka calendar: 1918–1919
- Bengali calendar: 1403–1404
- Berber calendar: 2947
- British Regnal year: 45 Eliz. 2 – 46 Eliz. 2
- Buddhist calendar: 2541
- Burmese calendar: 1359
- Byzantine calendar: 7505–7506
- Chinese calendar: 丙子年 (Fire Rat); 4694 or 4487 — to — 丁丑年 (Fire Ox); 4695 or 4488
- Coptic calendar: 1713–1714
- Discordian calendar: 3163
- Ethiopian calendar: 1989–1990
- Hebrew calendar: 5757–5758
- Hindu calendars
- Vikram Samvat: 2053–2054
- Shaka Samvat: 1918–1919
- Kali Yuga: 5097–5098
- Holocene calendar: 11997
- Igbo calendar: 997–998
- Iranian calendar: 1375–1376
- Islamic calendar: 1417–1418
- Japanese calendar: Heisei 9 (平成９年)
- Javanese calendar: 1929–1930
- Juche calendar: 86
- Julian calendar: Gregorian minus 13 days
- Korean calendar: 4330
- Minguo calendar: ROC 86 民國86年
- Nanakshahi calendar: 529
- Thai solar calendar: 2540
- Tibetan calendar: མེ་ཕོ་བྱི་བ་ལོ་ (male Fire-Rat); 2123 or 1742 or 970 — to — མེ་མོ་གླང་ལོ་ (female Fire-Ox); 2124 or 1743 or 971
- Unix time: 852076800 – 883612799

1997 (MCMXCVII) was a common year starting on Wednesday of the Gregorian calendar, the 1997th year of the Common Era (CE) and Anno Domini (AD) designations, the 997th year of the 2nd millennium, the 97th year of the 20th century, and the 8th year of the 1990s decade.

== Events ==
=== January ===
- January 1 – The Emergency Alert System is introduced in the United States.
- January 11 – Turkey threatens Cyprus on account of a deal to buy Russian S-300 missiles, prompting the Cypriot Missile Crisis.
- January 16 – Murder of Ennis Cosby: Near Interstate 405 in Los Angeles, Bill Cosby's son Ennis is shot in the head in a failed robbery attempt.
- January 17 – A Delta II rocket carrying a military GPS payload explodes, shortly after liftoff from Cape Canaveral.
- January 18 – In northwest Rwanda, Hutu militia members kill 6 Spanish aid workers and three soldiers, and seriously wound another.
- January 19 – Yasser Arafat returns to Hebron after more than 30 years, and joins celebrations over the handover of the last Israeli-controlled West Bank city. (→ Hebron Agreement)
- January 23 – Madeleine Albright becomes the first female Secretary of State of the United States, after confirmation by the United States Senate.
- January 26 – VJTI changes its name from Victoria Jubilee Technical Institute to Veermata Jijabai Technological Institute in Mumbai.

=== February ===
- February 2 – 1997 Liechtenstein general election: The Patriotic Union remains the largest party and wins a majority of 13 seats in the Landtag.
- February 4
  - On their way to Lebanon, two Israeli troop-transport helicopters collide, killing all 73 on board.
  - After at first contesting the results, Serbian President Slobodan Milošević recognizes opposition victories in the November 1996 elections.
  - A magnitude 6.5 earthquake strikes North Khorasan province, Iran, killing 88 people and injuring 1,948.
- February 10 – Sandline affair: Australian newspapers publish stories that the government of Papua New Guinea has brought mercenaries onto Bougainville Island.
- February 13 – STS-82: Tune-up and repair work on the Hubble Space Telescope is started by astronauts from the Space Shuttle Discovery.
- February 28
  - North Hollywood shootout: Two robbers, wearing kevlar body armor, and armed with illegally modified Type 56S rifles with high-capacity magazines and other weapons, injure 20 police officers and civilians in a gun battle. The incident sparks debate on the appropriate firepower for United States patrol officers to have available in similar situations in the future.
  - 1997 Turkish military memorandum: As a result of a meeting held by the National Security Council, the Turkish Armed Forces issues a memorandum to adopt more secular criteria. Later on June 18, the Turkish government resigns because of the pressure.

=== March ===
- March 4 – U.S. President Bill Clinton bans federal funding for any research on human cloning.
- March 7 – In Sri Lanka, the Tamil Tigers overrun a military base and kill over 100 Sri Lankan troops.
- March 9 – American rapper The Notorious B.I.G. is murdered in Los Angeles.
- March 13
  - India's Missionaries of Charity chooses Sister Nirmala, to succeed Mother Teresa as its leader.
  - The National People's Congress of the People's Republic of China creates a new Chongqing Municipality, out of part of Sichuan.
- March 16 – Sandline affair: On Bougainville Island in Papua New Guinea, soldiers of commander Jerry Singirok arrest Tim Spicer and his mercenaries of the Sandline International.
- March 18 – The tail of a Russian An-24 charter plane breaks off while en route to Turkey, causing the plane to crash, killing all 50 on board, and resulting in the grounding of all An-24s.
- March 21 – In Zaire, Étienne Tshisekedi is appointed prime minister; he ejects supporters of Mobutu Sese Seko from his cabinet.
- March 22 – The Comet Hale–Bopp makes its closest approach to Earth.
- March 24 – The 69th Academy Awards, hosted by Billy Crystal, are held at the Shrine Auditorium in Los Angeles, with The English Patient winning Best Picture. During the event, the DVD format is launched in the United States.
- March 24–26 – In San Diego, 39 Heaven's Gate cultists commit mass suicide at their compound.
- March 26 – Julius Chan resigns as prime minister of Papua New Guinea, effectively ending the Sandline affair.

=== April ===
- April 3 – The Thalit massacre in Algeria: all but 1 of the 53 inhabitants of Thalit are killed by guerrillas.
- April 14
  - Fire breaks out in a pilgrim camp on the Plain of Mena, 11 kilometres (6.8 mi) from Mecca; 343 die.
  - Former SS Captain Erich Priebke is retried; on July 22 he is sentenced to fifteen years in prison.
- April 18 – The Red River of the North breaks through dikes and floods Grand Forks, North Dakota, and East Grand Forks, Minnesota, causing US$2 billion in damage.
- April 21 – A Pegasus rocket carries the remains of 24 people into earth orbit, in the first space burial by Celestis company.
- April 22
  - Haouch Khemisti massacre: 93 villagers are killed in Algeria.
  - A 126-day hostage crisis at the residence of the Japanese ambassador in Lima, Peru.
- April 23 – 42 villagers are killed in the Omaria massacre in Algeria.
- April 29
  - The Organisation for the Prohibition of Chemical Weapons (OPCW), CWC treaty enters into force.
  - Two trains crash at Hunan, China; 126 are killed.

=== May ===
- May 1 – Tony Blair becomes Prime Minister of the United Kingdom, as the Labour Party wins the 1997 United Kingdom general election and returns to government for the first time in 18 years.
- May 10 – The 7.3 M_{w} Qayen earthquake strikes eastern Iran with a maximum Mercalli intensity of X (Extreme). At least 1,567 were killed and 2,300 were injured.
- May 11 – IBM's Deep Blue defeats Garry Kasparov in the last game of the rematch, the first time a computer beats a chess World champion in a match.
- May 12
  - The Russia–Chechnya Peace Treaty is signed.
  - An F1-rated tornado strikes downtown Miami, causing $525,000 in damages. Pictures and videos of this tornado made news headlines around the world.
- May 15 – The United States government acknowledges existence of the "Secret War" in Laos (1953–1975) during the Vietnam War, and dedicates the Laos Memorial in honor of Hmong and other "Secret War" veterans.
- May 16
  - First Congo War ends when president Mobutu Sese Seko is exiled from Zaire.
  - U.S. President Bill Clinton issues a formal apology to the surviving victims of the Tuskegee Study of Untreated Syphilis in the Negro Male and their families.
- May 17 – Troops of Laurent Kabila march into Kinshasa.
- May 21 – Radiohead releases OK Computer
- May 23
  - Mohammad Khatami wins the 1997 Iranian presidential election and becomes the first Iranian Reformist president.
  - A riot in Banjarmasin, Indonesia breaks out, causing at least 137 deaths.
- May 25 – A military coup in Sierra Leone replaces President Ahmad Tejan Kabbah with Major Johnny Paul Koroma.
- May 27 – The fourth-deadliest tornado of the 1990s hits in Jarrell, Texas, killing 27 people and causing extreme damage in the Double Creek Estates.
- May 31 – The 13-kilometer Confederation Bridge, the world's longest bridge spanning ice-covered waters, opens between Prince Edward Island and New Brunswick, Canada.

=== June ===
- June 1
  - Socialist Party-led Centre-left coalition won the second-round in 1997 French legislative elections, began with the third Cohabitation (1997–2002).
  - Hugo Banzer wins the Presidential elections in Bolivia.
- June 2 – In Denver, Colorado, Timothy McVeigh is convicted on 15 counts of murder and conspiracy for his role in the 1995 Oklahoma City bombing.
- June 10 – Khmer Rouge leader Pol Pot orders the killing of his defense chief, Son Sen, and 11 of Sen's family members, before Pol Pot flees his northern stronghold.
- June 11 – In the United Kingdom, the House of Commons votes for a total ban on handguns.
- June 13 – A jury sentences Timothy McVeigh to death for his part in the 1995 Oklahoma City bombing.
- June 16 – About 50 people are killed in the Daïat Labguer (M'sila) massacre in Algeria.
- June 21 – The Women's National Basketball Association (WNBA) plays its first game at The Great Western Forum in Los Angeles.
- June 25
  - A massive eruption of the Soufrière Hills volcano on the island of Montserrat leads to evacuation and eventual abandonment of the capital, Plymouth.
  - An uncrewed spacecraft Progress M-34 collides with the Russian space station Mir.
- June 26
  - Bertie Ahern is appointed as the 10th Taoiseach of the Republic of Ireland and Mary Harney is appointed as the 16th, and first female, Tánaiste, after their parties, Fianna Fáil and the Progressive Democrats respectively, win the 1997 General Election.

=== July ===
- July – The 1997 Central European flood occurs across Poland, Germany, and the Czech Republic.
- July 1 – The United Kingdom hands sovereignty of the British colony in Hong Kong to the People's Republic of China.
- July 2 – The Bank of Thailand floats the baht, triggering the Asian financial crisis.
- July 4 – NASA's Pathfinder space probe lands on the surface of Mars.
- July 5
  - In Cambodia, Hun Sen of the Cambodian People's Party overthrows Norodom Ranariddh in a coup.
  - The Egyptian Islamic Group announces a cessation-of-violence initiative.
- July 8 – NATO invites the Czech Republic, Hungary, and Poland to join the alliance in 1999.
- July 10 – In London, scientists report their DNA analysis findings from a Neanderthal skeleton, which support the out of Africa theory of human evolution, placing an "African Eve" at 100,000 to 200,000 years ago.
- July 11 – Royal Jomtien Resort Hotel fire at Pattaya, Thailand's worst hotel fire, kills 90.
- July 13 – The remains of Che Guevara are returned to Cuba for burial, alongside some of his comrades. Guevara and his comrades were executed on October 9 1967 in Bolivia.
- July 15 – Spree killer Andrew Cunanan shoots fashion designer Gianni Versace dead outside Versace's Miami Beach residence.
- July 17 – The F. W. Woolworth Company closes after 117 years in business.
- July 25 – K. R. Narayanan is sworn in as India's 10th president and the first member of the Dalit caste to hold this office.
- July 27 – About 50 are killed in the Si Zerrouk massacre in Algeria.
- July 30 – 18 people are killed in the Thredbo landslide in the Snowy Mountains resort in Australia.

=== August ===
- August 3 – Between 40 and 76 villagers are killed in the Oued El-Had and Mezouara massacre in Algeria.
- August 3–11 – Two of the three islands of the Union of the Comoros – Anjouan and Mohéli – attempt to revert to colonial rule by France. The plan fails when the French government of President Jacques Chirac refuses to recolonize them, resulting in the two islands being reintegrated into the Comoros over the next two years.
- August 4 – Jeanne Calment, the verified oldest person to have ever lived, dies at 122 years and 164 days.
- August 6 – Korean Air Flight 801 crash lands west of Guam International Airport, resulting in the deaths of 228 people.
- August 13 – Trey Parker and Matt Stone's animated television comedy series, South Park, started broadcasting with the first episode, Cartman Gets an Anal Probe, on Comedy Central.
- August 20 – More than 60 are killed, 15 kidnapped in the Souhane massacre in Algeria.
- August 26
  - 60–100 are killed in the Beni Ali massacre in Algeria.
  - The Independent International Commission on Decommissioning is set up in Northern Ireland, as part of a peace process.
- August 29
  - Over 98 (and possibly up to 400) are killed in the Rais massacre in Algeria.
  - Netflix, Inc. is founded as a DVD-by-mail rental service.
- August 31 – Death of Diana, Princess of Wales: Diana, Princess of Wales, is taken to a hospital after a car accident shortly after midnight, in the Pont de l'Alma road tunnel in Paris. She is pronounced dead at 4:00 am.

=== September ===
- September 1 – Dublin Regulation on treatment of applications for right of asylum under European Union law first comes into force.
- September 5
  - Over 87 are killed in the Beni Messous massacre in Algeria.
  - The International Olympic Committee picks Athens, Greece, to be the host city for the 2004 Summer Olympics.
- September 6 – The funeral of Diana, Princess of Wales, takes place at Westminster Abbey, London, UK, watched by over two billion people worldwide.
- September 11 – Scotland votes in favour of a devolved Parliament, forming the Scottish Parliament less than two years later.
  - Television series, Melangkah di Atas Awan was aired by Indonesian private television station, Indosiar. It was a final TV series of Ryan Hidayat, who died on 8 February 1997, before the TV series was broadcast.
- September 15 – The Norwegian parliamentary election is held in Norway.
- September 18
  - Al-Qaeda carries out a terrorist attack in Mostar, Bosnia and Herzegovina.
  - Wales votes in favour of devolution and the formation of a National Assembly for Wales.
- September 20 – 53 people are killed in the Guelb El-Kebir massacre in Algeria.
- September 21
  - The Islamic Salvation Army, the Islamic Salvation Fronts' armed wing, declares a unilateral ceasefire in Algeria.
  - St. Olaf's Church, a stone church from the 16th century in Tyrvää, Finland, is burnt down.
- September 26
  - Garuda Indonesia Flight 152 crashes while on approach to Medan, North Sumatra, during the 1997 Southeast Asian haze, killing all 234 people on board. This becomes the deadliest aviation accident in Indonesian history.
  - An earthquake strikes the Italian regions of Umbria and Marche, causing part of the Basilica of St. Francis at Assisi to collapse.

=== October ===
- October 1 – Luke Woodham walks into Pearl High School in Pearl, Mississippi, United States, and opens fire, killing two girls, after killing his mother earlier that morning.
- October 2 – British scientists Moira Bruce and John Collinge, with their colleagues, independently show that the new variant form of the Creutzfeldt–Jakob disease is the same disease as Bovine spongiform encephalopathy.
- October 3 – The President of Paraguay, Juan Carlos Wasmosy, orders the arrest of political opponent Lino Oviedo.
- October 10 – Uruguay's worst air disaster occurs when Austral Líneas Aéreas Flight 2553 crashes near Nuevo Berlín, killing all 74 on board.
- October 12 – Sidi Daoud massacre: 43 are killed at a false roadblock in Algeria.
- October 15
  - Andy Green sets the first supersonic land speed record for the ThrustSSC team, led by Richard Noble of the UK. ThrustSSC goes through the flying mile course at Black Rock Desert, Nevada at an average speed of 1,227.985 km/h (763.035 mph).
  - NASA launches the Cassini–Huygens probe to Saturn.
- October 16 – The first color photograph appears on the front page of The New York Times.
- October 17 – The remains of Che Guevara are laid to rest with full military honours in a specially built mausoleum in the city of Santa Clara, Cuba, where he had won the decisive battle of the Cuban Revolution 39 years before.
- October 22 – Danish escaped criminal Steen Christensen robs the Hotel Palace in Helsinki, Finland, killing two police officers while evading capture.
- October 29 – Iraq disarmament crisis: Iraq says it will begin shooting down Lockheed U-2 surveillance planes being used by UNSCOM inspectors.

=== November ===
- November 2 – Severe Tropical Storm Linda devastates southern Vietnam and Thailand, killing 3,275 people.
- November 9 – BBC News 24 has launched a new channel at 5:30pm, after the final closedown with the last national anthem of God Save the Queen, which occurred at approximately 2:57am for BBC One, following the death of Lady Diana Spencer.
- November 11 – Telecom companies WorldCom and MCI Communications announce a US$37 billion merger to form MCI WorldCom, the largest merger in U.S. history.
- November 12 – Mary McAleese is elected the eighth President of Ireland in succession to Mary Robinson, the first time in the world that one woman has succeeded another as elected head of state.
- November 13 – Ramzi Yousef is found guilty of masterminding the 1993 World Trade Center bombing.
- November 17 – In Luxor, Egypt, 62 people are killed by 6 Islamic militants outside the Temple of Hatshepsut.
- November 18 - Metallica released the album Reload internationally.
- November 19 – In Des Moines, Iowa, Bobbi McCaughey gives birth to septuplets in the second known case where all seven babies are born alive, and the first in which all survive infancy.
- November 27 – NASA's Tropical Rainfall Measuring Mission is launched, the start of the satellite component of the Clouds and the Earth's Radiant Energy System.

=== December ===
- December 1 – In the Indian state of Bihar, Ranvir Sena attacks the CPI(ML) Party Unity stronghold Lakshmanpur-Bathe, killing 63 lower caste people
- December 3 – In Ottawa (Canada) representatives from 121 countries sign a treaty prohibiting the manufacture and deployment of anti-personnel land mines. However, the United States, the People's Republic of China, Russia, South Korea and 32 other nations do not ratify the treaty.
- December 10 – The capital of Kazakhstan is moved from Almaty to Astana.
- December 11 – The Kyoto Protocol is adopted by a United Nations committee.
- December 15 – Microsoft releases Windows 98 Beta 3.
- December 16 – In Japan, over 700 children suffer photosensitive epilepsy attacks after watching an episode of the Pokémon anime.
- December 19
  - Janet Jagan (widow of Cheddi Jagan) takes office in Guyana.
  - SilkAir Flight 185 crashes into the Musi River, near Palembang in Indonesia, killing 104.
- December 21 – Brazil beats Australia 6–0 in the FIFA Confederations Cup final.
- December 24 – 50–1010 villagers are killed in the Sid El-Antri massacre in Algeria.
- December 27 – Ulster loyalist paramilitary leader Billy Wright is assassinated inside Long Kesh prison in Northern Ireland.
- December 29 – Hong Kong begins to kill all the chickens within its territory (1.25 million) to stop the spread of a potentially deadly Influenza A virus subtype H5N1 strain.
- December 30 – Wilaya of Relizane massacres of December 30, 1997: In the worst incident in Algeria's insurgency, 423 people from four villages in the wilaya of Relizane are killed.

== Nobel Prizes ==

- Chemistry – Paul D. Boyer, John E. Walker, Jens C. Skou
- Economics – Bank of Sweden – Robert C. Merton, Myron Scholes
- Literature – Dario Fo
- Peace – International Campaign to Ban Landmines and Jody Williams
- Physics – Steven Chu, Claude Cohen-Tannoudji, William D. Phillips
- Medicine – Stanley B. Prusiner
