= List of massacres during the Algerian Civil War =

Many massacres were committed during the Algerian Civil War that began in 1991. The Armed Islamic Group (GIA) claimed responsibility for many of them, while for others no group has claimed responsibility. In addition to generating a widespread sense of fear, the massacres effected migration from and depopulation of the worst-affected areas. The number of massacres peaked in 1997, with a smaller peak in 1994, and they were particularly concentrated in the areas between Algiers and Oran, with very few occurring in the east or in the Sahara.

This list is not exhaustive and covers only events in which over 50 civilians or prisoners were killed; with the number of smaller massacres being far more numerous. Sources frequently disagree on the number of deaths.

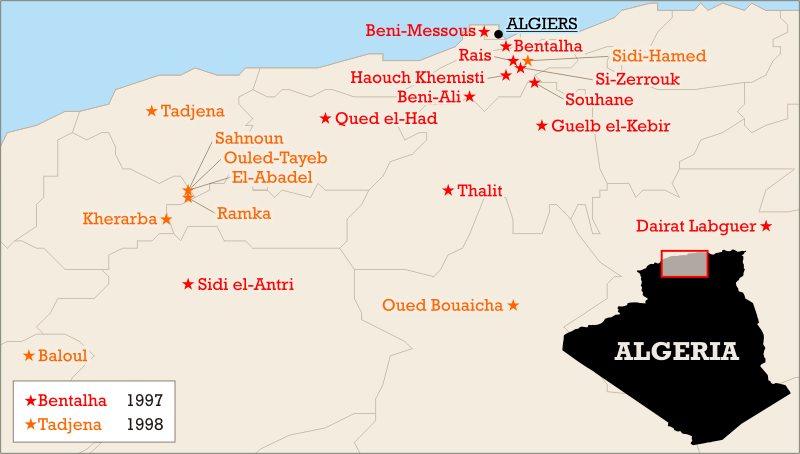
Massacres of over 50 people in 1997-1998

== Wilaya of Algiers ==
- Serkadji prison mutiny of 21 February 1995, 109 deaths
- Beni-Messous massacre of 5–6 September 1997, 87-151 deaths
- Bentalha massacre of 22 September 1997, 202-300 deaths

== Wilaya of Ain-Defla ==
- Ain-Defla massacre of March 1994, 80 deaths
- Oued El-Had and Mezouara massacre of 3 August 1997, 76 deaths

== Wilaya of Batna ==
- Batna-Msila Road massacre of 17 August 1996, 63 deaths

== Wilayas of Bouira and Blida ==
- Blida massacre of March 1994, 82 deaths
- Haouch Khemisti massacre of 21 April 1997, 93-113 deaths
- Si-Zerrouk massacre of 27 July 1997, 51 deaths
- Souhane massacre of 20–21 August 1997, 63 deaths
- Beni-Ali massacre of 26 August 1997, 64 deaths
- Rais massacre of 29 August 1997, 100-400 deaths
- Sidi-Hamed massacre of 11 January 1998, 120-400 deaths

== Wilaya of Chlef ==
- Alleged Tenes massacre of 4 May 1994, 173 deaths (not independently verified)
- Tadjena massacre of 8 December 1998, 81 deaths

== Wilaya of Médéa ==
- Berrouaghia prison massacre of 14 November 1994, 8-200 deaths
- Thalit massacre of 3–4 April 1997, 52 deaths
- Omaria massacre of 23 April 1997, 43 deaths
- Chouardia massacre of 27 April 1998, over 40 deaths
- Guelb El-Kebir massacre, 19 September 1997, 53 deaths

== Wilaya of M'Sila ==
- Dairat Labguer massacre of 16 June 1997, 50 deaths

== Wilaya of Oran ==
- Sidi Daoud massacre of 12 October 1997, 43-50 deaths

== Wilaya of Relizane ==
- Wilaya of Relizane massacres, of 30 December 1997, 78-412
  - Khrouba massacre, 176 deaths
  - Sahnoun massacre, 113 deaths
  - El-Abadel massacre, 73 deaths
  - Ouled-Tayeb massacre, 50 deaths
- Wilaya of Relizane massacres of 4 January 1998, ~1000 deaths
  - Remka massacre, 117 deaths

== Wilaya of Saïda ==
- Baloul massacre of 2 September 1998, 40-60 deaths

== Wilayas of Tiaret and Tissemsilt ==
- Sid El-Antri massacre of 23–24 December 1997, 53-117 deaths

== Other wilayas ==
- Oued Bouaicha massacre of 26 March 1998, 52 deaths, W. of Djelfa
- Beni Ounif massacre of 15 August 1999, 29 people

== See also ==
- Algerian Civil War
- Timeline of the Algerian Civil War
- Human rights in Algeria
- List of massacres in Algeria
- Terrorist bombings in Algeria

== Sources ==
- "An Anatomy of the Massacres", Ait-Larbi, Ait-Belkacem, Belaid, Nait-Redjam, and Soltani, in An Inquiry into the Algerian Massacres, ed. Bedjaoui, Aroua, and Ait-Larbi, Hoggar: Geneva 1999.
