= List of massacres in Algeria =

The following is a list of massacres that have occurred in Algeria. This is an incomplete list; the total number of massacres reported is far more numerous.

Name	Date	Location	Deaths	Notes
Ain-Defla massacre	1994 mid-March	Ain-Defla	80	Several massacres occurred at Ain-Defla, including in 1994, 1997 and 2001.
Baloul massacre	September 2, 1998	Village of Baloul, Saïda	40-60+	
Batna-Msila Road massacre	August 17, 1996	Batna	63	Bus stopped at a fake roadblock and 29 people killed by hatchets and knives.
Benachour massacre (1st)	December 5, 1996	Benachour, Blida	19	
Benachour massacre(2nd)	January 5, 1997	Benachour, Blida	16	
Beni Ali massacre	August 26, 1997	Beni Ali	100	
Béni Ounif massacre	August 15, 1999	Béni Ounif	29	
Beni-Messous massacre	September 5, 1997	Beni-Messous	87+	
Bentalha massacre	September 1997	15 km south of Algiers	200-400	"[T]he massacre of Bentalha in which 400 people had their throats cut one September night in 1997".
Berrouaghia prison massacre	November 14, 1994		30-200	
Blida massacre	March 1994	Blida	82	Massacres in Blida also occurred in 1997 and 2001.
Boufarik massacre	April 9, 1997	Boufarik	22	The victims were hacked to death.
Chouardia massacre	April 26, 1998	Wilaya of Médéa	40	
Dairat Labguer massacre	June 16, 1997	Dairat Labguer	50	Five nights earlier, another 17 had been killed 5 km away.
El Ouffia tribe massacre	1832	Algeria	500+	All the men, women and children of the El Oufia tribe were killed in one night.
Guelb El-Kebir massacre	September 1997	Beni Slimane	52	
Haouch Khemisti massacre	April 1997	Haouch Mokhfi Khemisti	93	The 93 villagers were decapitated in 3 hours on the night of April 22–23.
Hidroelektra workers massacre	December 14, 1993	near Blida	12	
In Amenas hostage crisis	January 16-19, 2013	In Amenas	39	
Isly massacre	March 26, 1962	Algiers	50-80	Massacre of Pieds-noirs protesting against Algeria's independence by Algerian Muslims troops.
Omaria massacre	April 23, 1997	Omaria (near Médéa)	42	
Oran massacre of 1962	July 5, 1962	Oran	95-453	Mass killing of French settlers living in Algeria by members of the Algerian National Liberation Army.
Oued Bouaicha massacre	March 26, 1998	Djelfa	52 (including 32 children)	The victims were killed by men carrying axes and knives, at Oued Bouaïcha in the municipality of Bouiret Lahdab; near Had Sahary. On the same day, a massacre occurred at Youb.
Oued El-Had and Mezouara massacre	August 3, 1997	Arib	40-76	
Oueid Khenig-Roum bombing	January 14, 2021	Oueid Khenig-Roum, Telidjane District, Tebessa Province	5	
Ouled Rhia tribe massacre	1845	Dahra	500-700	The entire Ouled Rhia tribe was killed by suffocation in a cave.
Rais massacre	August 29, 1997	Rais (near Larbaa)	800	"Some were shot, some had their throats cut, the heads of babies were severed. A group of extremists who claimed to be motivated by Islam carried out the killings."
Laghouat massacre	December 3, 1852	Ville de Laghouat	2300 - 3000	
Le Soir d'Algérie bombing	February 11, 1996	Algiers	29	The victims included three journalists.
Sétif and Guelma massacre	May 8, 1945	Sétif	6000-45000	
Sid El-Antri massacre	December 1997	Tiaret	48-117	
Sidi Daoud massacre	October 12, 1997	Sig	43	The Sidi Daoud massacre took place outside the village of Sidi Daoud near Sig in western Algeria on the night of 12 October 1997. 43 people were killed at a fake roadblock.
Sidi-Hamed massacre	January 11, 1998	Sidi-Hamed	103	70 injured
Si Zerrouk massacre	July 27, 1997	Larbaa	47-58	
Souhane massacre	August 1997	Souhane	64	
Tadjena massacre	December 9, 1998	mountain villages of Bouhamed and Ayachiche (just north of Tadjena)	81	In 2003, Tadjena was subjected to two additional massacres.
Tadjena massacre (second)	May 25, 2003	Tadjena	7	site of other massacres in 1998 and 2003
Tadjena massacre (third)	May 26, 2003	Tadjena	14	site of other massacres in 1998 and 2003
Tenes massacre	May 4, 1994	Ténès	16	
Thalit massacre	April 1997	Thalit	52	52 Of the 53 inhabitants were killed by slitting their throats. The villagers' homes were burned down afterwards.
Tiarit massacre	April 2001	Tiarit	15 women and children.	
Wilaya of Relizane massacres of 30 December 1997	December 30, 1997	4 villages	78-272 (varying estimates)	
Wilaya of Relizane massacres of 4 January 1998	January 4, 1998	Oued Rhiou	172+	
Youb massacre	March 26, 1998	Youb	11	On the same day as the Oued Bouaicha massacre

== See also ==
- List of massacres during the Algerian Civil War
