= Commander Azzedine =

- Native name: Rabah Zerari
- Nickname: Commander Azzedine
- Born: August 8, 1934 (age 91); Bejaia, French Algeria
- Allegiance: FLN
- Service years: 1955-1962, 1999
- Conflicts: Algerian War: Battle of Bouzegza; Operation Blue Bird; Battle of Ath Yahia Moussa; Algerian Civil War

Commander Azzedine, nom de guerre of Rabah Zerari, is a former officer who served in the National Liberation Army during the Algerian War. He was the head of the zonal company "Commando Ali Khodja" which fought in Wilaya IV against the Black Commandos of General Jacques Pâris de Bollardière and the 3rd Marine Infantry Parachute Regiment of Marcel Bigeard.

== Biography ==
=== Early life ===
Zerari was born on August 8, 1934, in Béjaïa. His father left him at the age of three, so he was raised by his older brother Said. An activist in the Algerian People's Party, his patriotism was emboldened after witnessing the Setif, Guelma and Kherrata massacres. In his 20s, he worked as an arc welder at Caterpillar Inc. in Algiers for a monthly salary of 18000 francs. Like many Algerians, he had heard about the Toussaint Rouge and was following the clashes in Aurès.

=== Algerian War ===
In February 1955, he was contacted by an activist from Clos-Salembier, Abderrahmane Lahla, who asked him to participate in the revolution. Initially, Zerari was asked to contribute 5,000 francs per month; dreaming of doing something bigger, he decided to attack the safe of the Caterpillar factory. He was interrupted by Frenchmen armed with hunting rifles, he fled but ws hit by a bullet in the calf. He fled to maquis of Algerian revolutionaries, and was trained by Amar Ouamrane.

In the summer of 1955, Zerari changed his name to Si Azzedine and was appointed the ALN leader of the Zbarbar sector, near Lakhdaria. He was noted for his initiative in collecting FLN donations and organizing raids. Azzedine was arrested on July 14, 1956, following a desperate battle where his unit was surrounded and Azzedine himself was seriously injured. He experienced harsh conditions in Tablat prison, but escaped that October with 13 prisoners. Azzedine was then appointed head of the Aïn Bessem region, in command of 8,000 soldiers, where he successfully led a series of ambushes earning him recognition as a guerrilla specialist. At the beginning of 1957, Azzedine inherited the zonal company "Commando Ali Khodja" founded by Ali Khodja. The force had 120 battle-hardened men, and under Azzedine the force increased tenfold.

With the Commando Ali Khodja company, Azzedine fought against the French Black Commandos, who were respected by the locals because they didn't torture. Azzedine himself respected his enemies, defeating spahi Lebel in hand-to-hand combat in 1957. After a victory at Oued Melah, a major operation was launched against him by General de Bollardiere and the 3rd RPC. At the battle of Agounnenda, some of his men stayed behind and sacrificed themselves to cover the withdrawal of Azzedine and other troops. Azzedine was wounded again at the start of 1958, and entrusted by ALN General Si M'Hammed with the command of all of Wilaya IV. Azzedine took part in the reversal of the Force K affair, a major French defeat. Azzedine was captured again by the 3rd RPC in November 1958.

Azzedine pretended to accept the Peace of the Brave, and was received as a soldier by General Jacques Massu. He defected shortly afterward and returned to the maquis. After 1959, Azzedine was an active participant in the National Council of the Algerian Revolution until 1962. He maintained contact with French prefect of Algiers Vitalis Cros and Michel Hacq to upkeep the Autonomous Zone of Algiers against the OAS. Following Algerian independence and the Summer crisis of 1962, Azzedine retired from military life at the age of 28.

=== Post-War ===
During the Algerian Civil War, Azzedine raised an army of 4,000 volunteers to fight the Armed Islamic Group of Algeria (GIA) with the blessing of President Liamine Zéroual. He published two books about his experience as a fighter: On nous appelled fellaghas, published in 1976, and Algers ne brule pas in 1980. He co-wrote the Algerian-French film C'etait le Guerre, and in 2006 helped Claude Herbie with his movie Ni heros, ni bastards on French conscripts in Algeria.

During the commemoration of the 50th anniversary of the Évian Accords, Azzedine said "The summer crisis of 1962 was the start of all our woes, independence began with a coup." Regarding the historiography of the Algerian war, he said "They want to write it with an eraser, not a pen."

In February 2015, he was sentenced by the court in Chéraga for issuing bad checks. He was sentenced to two years in prison along with his son-in-law.

In his book Pour une parcelle de gloire, General de Bollardiere praised Commander Azzedine, lending credence to why the two shook hands on French television.
