= Le Soir d'Algérie bombing =

Terrorist incident in Algeria

- Part of the Algerian Civil War
- Location: 36°45′26″N 3°03′48.9″E; Algiers, Algeria
- Date: February 11, 1996
- Deaths: 23 civilians (3 journalists)
- Perpetrator: Armed Islamic Group of Algeria

On February 11, 1996, militants of the Armed Islamic Group of Algeria bombed the headquarters of the Le Soir d'Algérie newspaper in Algiers. 29 people, including three journalists, were killed by the terrorists.

== Events ==
On 11 February 1996, around 15h 45' , a car bomb carrying 300 kilograms of TNT exploded at 100 rue Hassiba Ben Bouali outside Le Soir d'Algérie's office. 29 people were killed, including three journalists : Allaoua Ait M'barak, Mohamed Dorbane and Djamel Derraz. The offices of three other newspapers in the same building were damaged.

== Aftermath ==
In the days that followed the bombing, the journalists for Le Soir d'Algerie worked in the office of El Watan. Encouraged by other journalists and the Algerian media, Le Soir d'Algérie published a new issue on 25 February and moved its office to another building, which was inaugurated by Ahmed Ouyahia.

== See also ==
- Charlie Hebdo massacre
