= Benachour massacre of 5 December 1996 =

Terrorist incident in Algeria

- Part of Algerian Civil War
- Location: Benachour, Blida, Algeria
- Date: 5 December 1996
- Target: Algerians
- Deaths: 19 villagers
- Perpetrator: Armed Islamic Group of Algeria

The Benachour massacre of 5 December 1996 took place in the village of Benachour located 50km south of Algiers and 2km from Blida. The massacre was part of the Algerian Civil War.

== Massacre ==
On the night of 5 December 1996, armed GIA militants entered the village of Benachour, killing 19 people, 11 of them being from the Mokhtafi family (5 women, 1 child, and 5 men). Following these events the Benachour village officially made their own self defense group, they were once again attacked exactly a month later on 5 January 1997.
