= Bentalha =

Bentalha may refer to:

- WR Bentalha
- Bentalha massacre
- Malik Bentalha
