= Who kills who =

''Who kills who?'' (French: Qui tue qui ?) is a phrase summarizing that "we don't know who is killing who" during the Algerian Civil War. in which the country (between 1991 and 2002) was in an armed conflict between the Algerian government, supported by the People's National Army (ANP), and various armed Islamist groups.

== Background ==
The Islamic Salvation Front (FIS) won the first round of the parliamentary elections on December 26, 1991, with 188 seats. The second round, which was expected to give the party a victory, never took place. The elections were annulled on January 11, 1992, by a decision of the military clique of "January generals." A state of emergency was proclaimed on February 9, 1992 and the FIS is dissolved by judicial means on March 4, 1992. Following this military coup, the Islamists initially targeted symbols of the state. Six months after the elections were annulled, Algeria descended into open and indiscriminate violence. Intellectuals, journalists, judges, police officers, ordinary citizens, and foreign nationals were assassinated. These deadly acts of violence were attributed to the Armed Islamic Group (GIA). The army launched major operations to "eradicate" the Islamist groups . Between 1992 and 1998, the war claimed countless lives every day.

== Etymology ==
This phrase, popular at the time, remains partly relevant today, used by the lobby in France. to designate the Algerian army as solely responsible for the massacres of civilians. Several books, television documentaries, news sites have been published highlighting the thesis of ''Who kills who?''.
