= Hocine Zaourar =

Algerian photojournalist

Hocine Zaourar (born 18 December 1952), also known by the mononym Hocine, is an Algerian photojournalist. His photograph of a woman grieving after the Bentalha massacre in Algeria, dubbed the "Madonna of Bentalha", won both the World Press Photo of the Year and the Bayeux Calvados-Normandy Award for war correspondents in 1998.

== Life and work ==
Hocine took up photography in 1970. He joined Reuters as a photojournalist in 1989 and worked for Agence France-Presse from January 1993. Initially he worked in various countries, in particular Somalia, Rwanda and Zaire, but later worked entirely in Algeria.

Hocine's photograph titled "Woman Grieves after Massacre in Bentalha" was made on 23 September 1997 outside Zmirli Hospital, 15 km from Algiers. Dead and wounded people had been taken to the hospital after the Bentalha massacre by the Armed Islamic Group of Algeria the previous night, during the Algerian Civil War. The photograph was published on the front pages of many newspapers, and was later dubbed the "Madonna of Bentalha" or "Bentalha Madonna". It caused controversy in Algeria and "has been credited with focusing attention on political violence" in the country.

== Awards ==
- 1998: Winner, World Press Photo of the Year 1997, World Press Photo, Amsterdam for "Woman Grieves after Massacre in Bentalh"
- 1998: First Prize, People in the News – Singles category, World Press Photo 1997, Amsterdam for "Woman Grieves after Massacre in Bentalh"
- 1998: The Public Prize, Bayeux Calvados-Normandy Award for war correspondents, Bayeux, France for "Femmes algériennes"
