= Beni Ounif massacre =

1999 terrorist attack in Morocco

- Part of Algerian Civil War
- Location: Beni Ounif, Algeria
- Date: 15 August 1999
- Attack type: Terrorist attack
- Deaths: 29
- Perpetrator: Armed Islamic Group of Algeria

The Beni Ounif massacre took place on a desert highway near the Moroccan border at Beni Ounif in Bechar Province on 15 August 1999. The perpetrators flagged down cars at a false roadblock and beheaded 23 men, women and children and shot dead 6 more people as they tried to run away. They also kidnapped two 15-year-old girls and stole the belongings of their victims. President Abdelaziz Bouteflika suggested that the terrorists found shelter in Morocco, but a Moroccan government spokesman denied that Morocco had anything to do with any of the suspected members of the GIA.
