= Tenes massacre =

- Part of Algerian Civil War
- Location: 36.2603°N 0.9036°E; Ténès, Algeria
- Deaths: 173
- Perpetrator: Organisation of Young Free Algerians (allegedly)

According to the "Algerian Committee of Free Activists for Human Dignity and the Rights of Man", which says its claims are based on witnesses' testimony, 173 corpses were found in the forest of El Marsa near Ténès (eastern Algeria) on May 4, 1994 of people kidnapped by the security services and/or the pro-government paramilitary Organisation of Young Free Algerians (OJAL) in the villages of Taougrit, Ouled Boudoua, Sidi Moussa and Tala Aïssa following the killing of 16 soldiers by Islamist guerrillas in an ambush nearby on April 25. This figure appears to include 65 people who had been taken away from the Taougrit mosque on April 29 by uniformed men, and were found killed outside the village. However, it is unclear whether any of these claims have been independently substantiated, and the Algerian Civil War provides obvious potential motives for opposition groups to try to discredit the military. If the claims are correct, this would be one of the earliest large-scale massacres of the Algerian civil conflict.

== See also ==
- List of massacres in Algeria

== Bibliography ==
- Comité Algérien des Militants Libres de la Dignité Humaine et des Droits de l'Homme. Livre blanc de la répression (1991-1994), vol. 1, Éditions Hoggar, Genève, 1995, p. 77-84.
