= Tadjena massacre =

1998 terrorist attacks in Algeria

- Part of Algerian Civil War
- Location: Tadjena, Algeria
- Date: 8 December 1998
- Deaths: 81
- Perpetrator: Armed Islamic Group of Algeria

The Tadjena massacre was an incident resulting in 81 deaths. Beginning about 9:00 p.m. on December 8 and continuing until early December 9, 1998, 81 villagers (45 according to the initial reports) were killed by armed groups in the mountain villages of Bouhamed and Ayachiche just north of Tadjena, some 170 km (106 mi) west of Algiers, in the Chlef region of western Algeria. The manner of killing is reported to have been notably sadistic, mutilating victims and burning corpses; CNN quoted a survivor as saying that "attackers slashed the throats of children, cutting the arms and legs off one of them and throwing the body in a boiling pot." In addition, 20 women (8 according to initial reports) were kidnapped. Another 7 people had been killed there on the previous night. The massacre took place about ten days before the beginning of Ramadan.

The massacre was reported by a Member of Parliament in a televised parliamentary debate. The massacre site was later visited by the Interior Minister, Mostefa Bensamour. The authorities announced a manhunt for the murderers responsible on the national radio, and declared that a "terrorist band" was responsible. A nearby mountain was described as a major Armed Islamic Group (GIA) base; the GIA is thus presumed to be responsible. However (at least as of December 10, 1998) no group had admitted to the massacre.

Tadjena was later subjected to a second smaller massacre on the 25–26 May 2003, when 7 people were killed on the 25th and another 14 from a single family on the 26th.

== See also ==
- List of massacres in Algeria
- List of Algerian massacres of the 1990s
