= Tazoult prison escape =

1994 prison raid in Algeria

- Part of Algerian Civil War
- Date: 10 March 1994
- Location: Tazoult, Algeria
- Perpetrator: Armed Islamic Group of Algeria
- Outcome: 1,000 to 1,200 prisoners escaped
- Deaths: 5
- Arrests: 39

On 10 March 1994, 1,000 to 1,200 inmates (mainly Islamist militants) escaped from a prison in Tazoult, Algeria, who were fighting to overthrow the Algerian government since early 1992. They fled when an Islamist commando unit supported by the prison staff raided the prison and released the inmates. The escapees included 280 prisoners who were on death row. Authorities killed 5 men and arrested 39 during the prison escape. The Armed Islamic Group of Algeria claimed responsibility for this from Pakistan.
