= Souhane =

Coordinates: 36°30′23″N 3°14′15″E

Souhane صوحان
- Commune and town
- Interactive map of Souhane
- Country: Algeria
- Province: Blida Province
- Time zone: UTC+1 (CET)

Souhane is a large mountain town between Larbaa and Tablat in the wilaya of Blida, Algeria, along the RN 8 highway about 27 km south of Algiers.

Following the Souhane massacre of 20 August-21 August 1997, in which 64 people were killed and 15 women kidnapped, the terrified population left en masse, bringing the town's population down from 4000 before the massacre to just 103 in 2002; since then, the population has increased, to 300 in 2005. The population has grown rapidly since then, because of more people moving back into the town.

In the local elections of 2002, it gave 5 seats to the traditional single party the FLN, 1 to the recent pro-military RND, and 1 to the moderate Islamist HMS

Its postcode is 0917.
