= Tadjena =

Coordinates: 36°19′N 1°08′E

- Commune and town
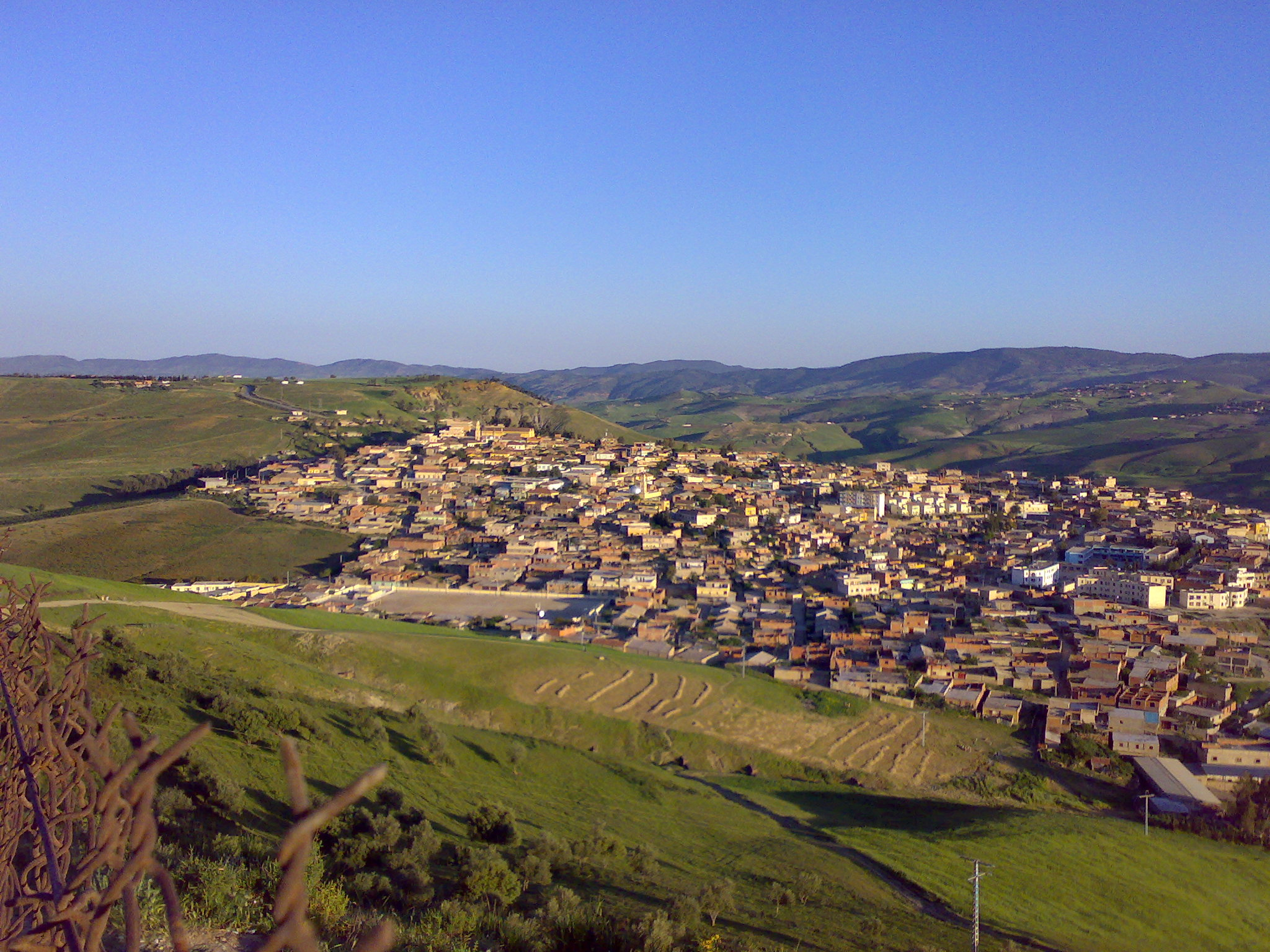

- Country: Algeria
- Province: Chlef Province
- District: Abou El Hassan
- Time zone: UTC+1 (CET)

Tadjena (Arabic: تدجنة) (formerly Fromentin) is a town in the Dahra mountains in Chlef Province in central Algeria, with a population of about 23,000; its altitude is 438 m.

== History ==
The settlement of Tadjena was originally named after Eugene Fromentin, a French painter and poet who spent a lot of time in Algeria. The Tadjena massacre in 1997 occurred in two villages nearby.
