= Le Soir d'Algérie =

Algerian French-language newspaper

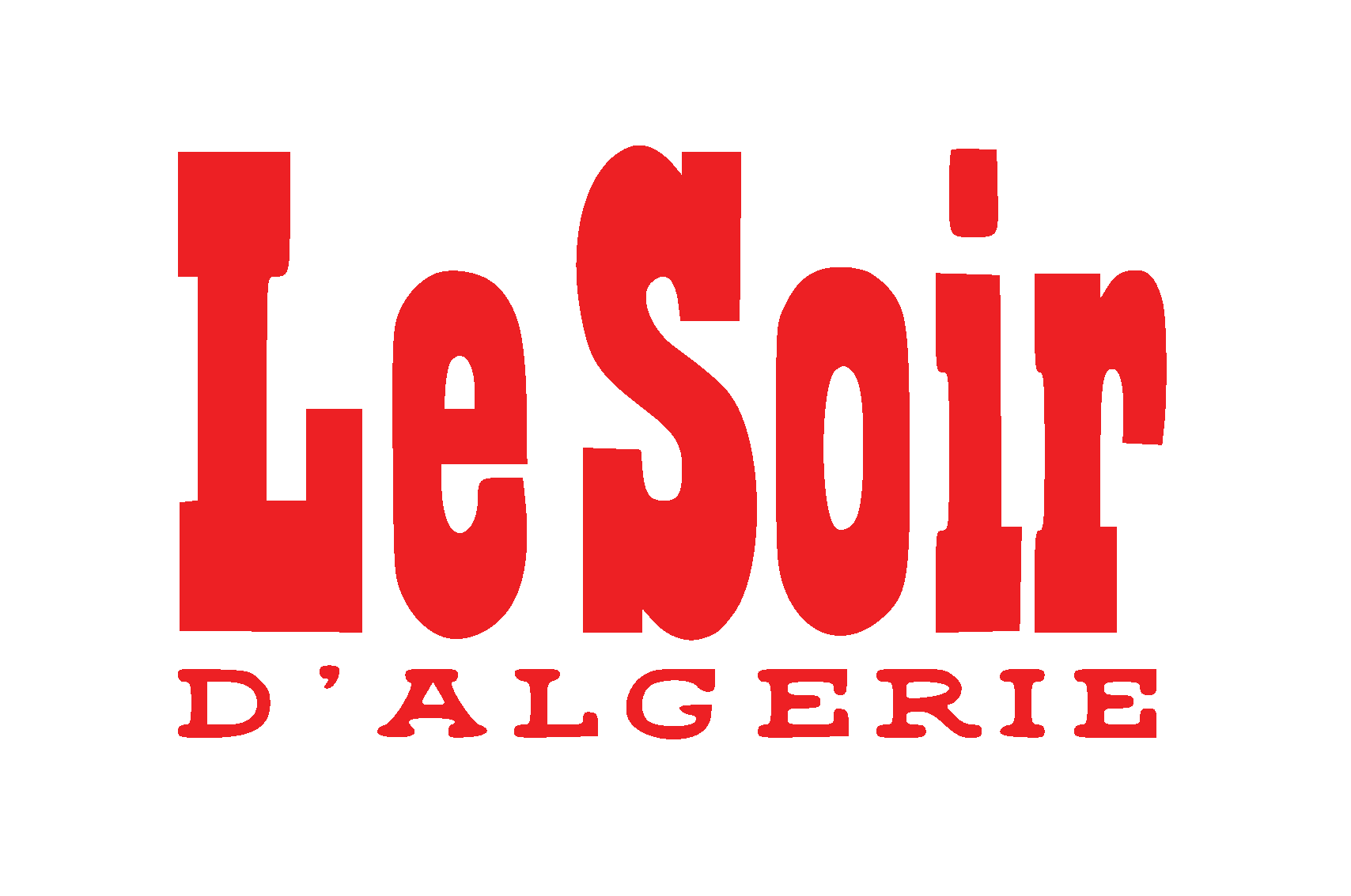
Logo of Le Soir d'Algérie.

Le Soir d'Algérie (meaning Algerian Evening in English; ISSN 1111-0074) is a French-language evening newspaper based in Algiers, Algeria.

== History and profile ==
Le Soir d'Algérie was established in 1990. Its circulation reached 150,000 copies following the first seven months. The paper is privately owned and is headquartered in Algiers. In the 1990s and at the beginning of the 2000s the paper had an independent political stance.

In August 2003 Le Soir d'Algérie temporarily ceased publication due to its debt to state-run printing presses. Fouad Boughanim served as the editor-in-chief of the paper.
