= Babelmed =

Babelmed is a non profit organisation established in Rome in April 2001. Its main objective is to promote cultural exchanges between the countries surrounding the Mediterranean Sea and to spread information and ideas around the area.

In 2002, the association launched Babelmed.net, which aims to be a link between people, events and cultural production in the Mediterranean and to provide independent information on a range of issues. It is run by a central editorial team in Rome and a network of 17 correspondents around the Mediterranean Basin.

== Philosophy ==
The name "babelmed" refers to the Mediterranean "med" and its cultural diversity "babel". "Bab" is also the Arabic word for "door". Languages featured on the site are mainly French and English, and partly Arabic. Articles in the different country sections are presented in their original languages.

The organisation's output emphasises the close connections between Western European countries and Muslim Mediterranean countries through history, cultural roots, and mutual fertilisation of music, literature and films, on the basis that the cultural dimensions of these broad subjects plays a key role towards improving mutual understanding and reducing tensions.

== Content ==
Babelmed focuses on culture, broadly defined. The content of the site is divided into several sections: cultural agenda, press review, features, creations and archives. Each section is then divided into sub-sections such as Visual Arts, Performing arts, Literature, and so on. The site also contains on-line and interactive exhibitions, such as "Syria, in the eyes of Europe, or "The sense of commerce". Social and political issues are covered from a cultural point of view, attempting to promote cross-cultural understanding of national or local phenomena.

Permanent sections deal with specific themes: Films, Books and CDs, Impressions, Travels, Cooking Chronicles, Poetry, Geoart. The content of the site is also available by country, with a research engine to help find specific articles on the site from their source. The site also carries features on the central issues of Mediterranean cultures, sorted by main themes (women, migration, war, cuisine, for example) or by geographical locations.

== Editorial line ==
Babelmed's main goal is to provide politically independent information on cultural issues in the Mediterranean region. It is an independent organisation that does not belong to any media group and has no link with any political, professional or religious body. It operates with subsidies from foundations promoting cultural dialogue and freedom of expression around the Mediterranean.

The organisation has partnerships with more than 300 cultural institutions in the Mediterranean, such as Publishing houses, media, cultural institutions, museums, festivals, Independent places of creation and performance. Other links have been developed with sites such as Medi1, Confluences Méditerranée, Actes Sud, Radio Orient, and Qantara.de.
