= Sidi-Hamed massacre =

January 1998 massacre in northern Algeria

- Part of Algerian Civil War
- Location: Sidi-Hamed, Algeria
- Date: 11 January 1998
- Deaths: 103–400 villagers
- Injuries: 70 villagers
- Perpetrator: Armed Islamic Group or Islamic Salvation Front (claims)
- No. of participants: 50 gunmen

The Sidi-Hamed massacre took place on the night of January 11, 1998 (the last day of Ramadan), in the town of Sidi-Hamed (or Sidi-Hammad), 30 km south of Algiers. An estimated fifty gunmen participated, attacking children and adults; they bombed a café where films were being watched and a mosque in nearby Haouche Sahraoui, killing those who fled, and entered houses to kill those within. According to official figures, 103 people were killed and 70 injured, including two pro-government fighters and five of the attackers. Other sources indicate a higher toll; AFP supposedly counted over 120 corpses, and some Algerian newspapers claimed 400. Thirty girls were reportedly kidnapped. The massacre was generally blamed on the Armed Islamic Group of Algeria (GIA). One newspaper claimed that survivors blamed it on the Islamic Salvation Front (AIS).

== See also ==
- List of Algerian massacres of the 1990s
