= Chouardia massacre =

1997 terror attack in Algeria

- Part of Algerian Civil War
- Location: Chouardia, Algeria
- Date: 27 April 1997
- Deaths: 40 villagers

The Chouardia massacre took place on 27 April 1997 in the village of Chouardia, Algeria. An armed group stormed the town and killed over 40 villagers in an attack overnight, in the village of Chouardia in the mountainous Médéa region, 60 miles south of Algiers. Details on the attack were not immediately available until security forces were dispatched to investigate. No one claimed responsibility for the attack, however it occurred in an area where the Armed Islamic Group of Algeria is known to be active. A previous attack in the Médéa region took place on 6 April, at least 10 people were killed.
