= Beni Slimane =

Beni Slimane بني سليمان
- Commune and town
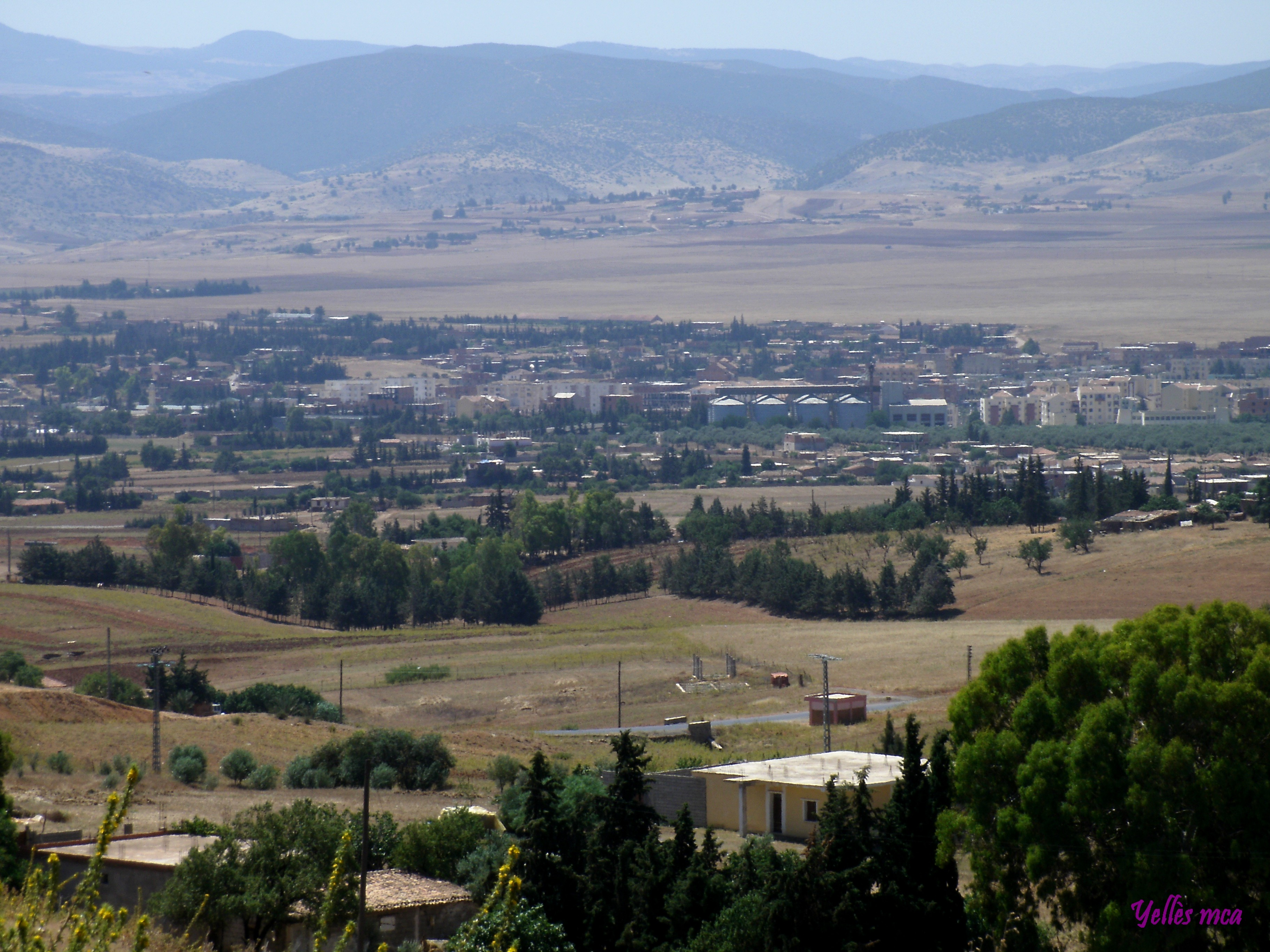
- Beni Slimane
- Nickname: ar

- Location within Algeria
- Coordinates: 36°13′37″N 3°18′21″E
- Country: Algeria
- Province: Médéa Province

Population (2008)
  - Total: 33,779
- Time zone: UTC+1 (CET)

Beni Slimane is a town and commune in Médéa Province, Algeria. According to the 1998 census, it has a population of 31,588.
