= Benachour massacre of 5 January 1997 =

Terrorist incident in Algeria

Benachour Massacre of 5 January 1997
- Part of Algerian Civil War
- Location: Benachour, Blida, Algeria
- Date: 5 January 1997
- Target: Algerians
- Deaths: 26 (16 villagers, 10 attackers)
- Perpetrator: Armed Islamic Group of Algeria
- No. of participants: 50 attackers

The Benachour Massacre of 5 January 1997 took place in the village of Benachour located 50km south of Algiers and 2km from Blida. The massacre was part of the Algerian Civil War.

== Massacre ==
On the night in question, an armed Islamist commando belonging to the Armed Islamic Group of Algeria attacked the village, However, the citizens who suffered a previous attack on December 5th 1996, that killed 19 people, made a self defense group, managing to kill 10 attackers before the commando could retreat, nevertheless the attackers managed to enter several houses killing 16 civilians, the majority of whom were women and children.
