= Oued Bouaicha massacre =

Part of the Algerian Civil War in 1998

Coordinates: 34.674°N 3.258°E

- Part of Algerian Civil War
- Location: Near Djelfa, Algeria
- Date: 26 March 1998
- Deaths: 47 villagers
- No. of participants: 15 militants

The Oued Bouaïcha massacre took place about 150 miles (240 km) south of Algiers, near Djelfa, on March 26, 1998, during the Algerian Civil War. Forty-seven people, including 27 children under the age of sixteen, were killed at Oued Bouaïcha in the municipality of Bouire Lahdab, near Had Sahary, by about fifteen men carrying axes and knives, who also kidnapped three young women. On the same day, another eleven people were killed on the other side of the country at Youb.

== See also ==
- List of massacres in Algeria
