= Berrouaghia prison massacre =

Alleged 1994 prison massacre in Algeria

- Part of Algerian Civil War
- Location: Berrouaghia prison, Algeria
- Date: 14 November 1994
- Deaths: 30 to 200

The Berrouaghia prison massacre is alleged to have taken place on 14 November 1994, after an escape attempt at Algeria's Berrouaghia prison. Estimates of the death toll vary wildly. The government gave the figure of eight dead, while others placed the death toll at 30 or higher, and El Watan later gave a figure of 200.

== See also ==
- List of massacres in Algeria
