= Thalit =

Small hamlet in Algeria

Thalit (Arabic: ثالت) was a small hamlet in Algeria, all but one of whose 100 inhabitants were killed in 1997 in the Thalit massacre.
