= Operation Blue Bird =

1956 French Algerian War operation

- Part of Algerian War
Date	April 1956 – 1 October 1956
Location	Kabylia, Algeria
Result	FLN victory: French operational failure

Belligerents
(Algeria) FLN: "Force K" defectors	French Republic: "Force K"

Commanders and leaders
(Algeria) Krim Belkacem (Algeria) Saïd Mohammedi (Algeria) Zaidat Ahmed (Algeria) Mehlal Said (Algeria) Omar Toumi	(France) Robert Lacoste (France) General Lorillot (France) Captain Hentic

Strength
300 men	Unknown

Casualties and losses
Unknown, at least 2 killed	12 killed 6 wounded 400 weapons seized

Operation Blue Bird was a mission carried out by France's foreign intelligence service, the SDECE, in 1956 during the second year of the Algerian War of Independence. Its aim was to turn several hundred Kabyle people against the Algerian resistance known as the National Liberation Front (FLN), with the hope of creating a clandestine counter-resistance force. These Kabyle fighters were known as Force K.

The operation backfired and resulted in supplying the FLN with money, weapons, and new soldiers. The operation remained secret for many years, and it is still largely unknown in France and Algeria. Yves Courrière claims to have been the first to make information about the operation available to the public.

== History of the operation ==
=== Organization ===
The idea of setting up a "counter-resistance" in Kabylie, French Algeria, came from Henri-Paul Eydoux, a technical adviser to the cabinet of Governor-General Jacques Soustelle. He instructed Gaston Pontal, director of the Direction de la surveillance du territoire (DST) and the Algerian police, to set up the operation. When the Service Action of the SDECE was first suggested to take charge of the "counter-resistance" in coastal Kabylie, the proposal was initially rejected.

Soustelle obtained an agreement for the launch of a counter-resistance operation from General Lorillot, commander of the Tenth Military Region and his 2nd Bureau. Captain Benedetti of the Operational Intelligence Service (ORS) was the correspondent. During the course of its planning in 1955, it was decided the operation would be called "Force K" (for Kabylie). It was later called "Blue Bird" and was continued by Governor Robert Lacoste, who succeeded Soustelle. Captain Camous was asked to supervise the practical details of the operation. Camous, wary from his experience with special missions, allowed the police to manage the undercover agents who were the backbone of the operation.

The inspector of the DST, Ousmeur, himself of Kabyle origin, came into contact with Tahar Hachiche on the order of his chain of command. Hachiche easily accepted the idea of helping to organize an anti-FLN resistance in the region, where the supporters of the Algerian National Movement (MNA) were numerous. He extended these proposals to Ahmed Zaidat, an innkeeper and grocer, who was influential within the local population. Zaidat was careful not to reveal that he occupied functions in the FLN structure, and requested a brief period of reflection. He then reported this information to his friend, a garage mechanic named Mohamed Yazouren, a friend of Said Mohammedi, who encouraged Krim Belkacem. They entrusted him with the organization and responsibility of the maneuver.

On the ground, especially in Iflissen, Omar Toumi took charge of the recruitment, while Mehlal Said was in charge of the recruitment in Azazga region. Toumi apparently had all the confidence of Captain Maublanc who commanded the 15th Company BCA (Compagnie du 15e BCA), responsible for the sector. When they reached an agreement with Zaïdi, Hachiche claimed the arms and the promised funds. Algiers immediately executed the plan, and the van that delivered the newspaper L'Echo d'Alger brought the first weapons (muskets, Garands, Stens and shotguns), the corresponding ammunition, and two million francs. Thus, 200 weapons were delivered in January 1956, and 80 more in February–March. The funds allocated by the governor-general amounted to nine million per month.

A stela is erected in Azazga in honor of Mehlal Said and Zaidet Ahmed for their contribution to Operation Blue Bird.

== Bibliography ==
- Jean Servier, Adieu djebels, Paris, Éditions France Empire, 1958. Témoignage où l'affaire est évoquée, Hentic et Camous étant baptisés « béret rouge » et « béret bleu »
- Camille Lacoste-Dujardin, Opération oiseau bleu. Des Kabyles, des ethnologues et la guerre d'Algérie., La Découverte, 1997, (ISBN 9782707126665). Dans un compte rendu dans la revue des Annales, le spécialiste de l'histoire coloniale Jacques Frémeaux déplore que le livre de Camille Lacoste-Dujardin ne présente que « très peu de documents » sur l'opération Oiseau bleu proprement dite
- André-Roger Voisin, INTOX et coups fourrés pendant la guerre d'Algérie, Ed. Cheminements, 2008, (ISBN 978-2-84478-662-3)
- Maurice Faivre, Le renseignement dans la guerre d'Algérie, collection Renseignement, histoire & géopolitique, Édition Lavauzelle, 2006 (ISBN 2-7025-1314-X)
- Mohamed Salah Essedik, Opération Oiseau bleu, Ed. Dar El Oumma, 2002, (ISBN 9961-67-141-4)
