= Souhane massacre =

1997 massacre in Algeria

- Part of Algerian Civil War
- Location: Souhane, Algeria
- Date: 20–21 August 1997
- Deaths: 64 villagers

The largest of the Souhane massacres occurred in the small mountain town of Souhane (about 25 km south of Algiers, between Larbaa and Tablat) on 20–21 August 1997. 64 people were killed, and 15 women were kidnapped; the resulting terror triggered a mass exodus, reducing the town's population down from 4000 before the massacre to just 103 in 2002. Smaller-scale massacres later took place on November 27, 1997 (18 men, 3 women and 4 children killed) and 2 March 2000, when some 10 people from a single household were killed by guerrillas. The massacres were attributed on Islamist groups such as the GIA.

== See also ==
- List of Algerian massacres of the 1990s
- List of massacres in Algeria
