= Beni Messous massacre =

Massacre in Algeria

Coordinates: 36.7797°N 2.9753°E

- Part of Algerian Civil War
- Location: Sidi Youssef, Algeria
- Date: 5 September 1997
- Deaths: 87–150 villagers
- No. of participants: 50 militants

The Beni Messous massacre, part of the Algerian Civil War, occurred on the nights of September 5 and September 6, 1997, in Sidi Youssef, a working-class area in the town of Beni Messous. At least 84 people were killed.

== Background ==
In 1997, Algeria was at the peak of a brutal civil conflict that had begun after the military's cancellation of 1992 elections set to be won by the Islamic Salvation Front (FIS). Guerrillas fighting the government took refuge in the forest of Bainem west of Algiers. The Sidi Youssef neighborhood of Beni Messous (see detailed map) stands just on the edge of this forest. Beni Messous is an outlying suburb of Algiers (see map) along the Beni Messous river, home to a large military barracks. One account indicates that a military search for guerrillas in the forest was underway when the massacre started.

== Massacre ==
At about 10 pm on September 5, 1997, about 50 howling men, some of them dressed in military forms, arrived in Sidi Youssef, wielding knives and machetes, and started breaking into houses and killing those within. The victims screamed for help and banged pots and pans to alert their neighbors. Security forces did not arrive until 1 am, despite being stationed close by. The terrorists killed at least 87 people that night, according to the Associated Press; no official death toll was issued, and two political parties, FFS and HMS, claimed about 150 were killed, whereas Daikha Dridi (babelmed) reports 53. It was followed by a second night of killing the next day which reportedly left another 45 dead.

== Responsibility ==
No group claimed responsibility, but the Algerian government blamed militant Islamist groups such as the GIA. The government told the UN Commission on Human Rights (E/CN.4/2000/3/Add.1) that "A judicial inquiry was opened, and on 7 July 1998 an anti-terrorist raid was carried out on the hideout of the eight culprits. The legal proceedings continue." It is unclear how to reconcile this with what a general told the UN investigative panel that visited the site on 27 July 1998: "of those who had committed the atrocities only eight were still at large and one was in Serkadji prison. The leader of the terrorist group had been shot dead 10 days earlier."

Amnesty International has questioned the state's response, saying that "Beni Messous has the largest barracks and military security centre of the capital, as well as several other gendarmerie and security forces centres from which the site of the massacre is clearly visible. The army barracks of Cheraga (see map) is only a few kilometres away. Neighbours telephoned the security forces who refused to intervene saying the matter was under the mandate of the gendarmerie. They called the gendarmerie but received no reply, and the attackers left undisturbed." However, the aforementioned general argued to the UN panel, with the help of a topographic map, that the army and gendarmerie had been unable to prevent the massacre, saying that "bombs had been set off to stop the army; and electrical power had been turned off by the attackers. The neighbouring farmers had not been able to provide help, as the terrorists had planted explosives, but they had alerted the security forces whose post divisional headquarters was a few kilometres away." He added that the government had urged the main family attacked to move somewhere safer earlier, and it had refused, and reported claims that the family in question had been feeding the terrorists and had possibly become rich as a result.

== Aftermath ==
Many families fled Sidi Youssef following these massacres; some took refuge in the Beni-Messous stadium and were still there in 2002. The houses where the massacre took place were demolished by mayoral decree in 2001; only scattered ruins remain, and no plaque marks the spot.

== Eyewitness quotes ==
Quoted by Rachid Khiari, Associated Press, Sept. 7:

"We heard victims screaming and cries for help, but no one came," one of those who escaped told The Associated Press.
"They kicked the door in, took the men, forced them outside, slit their throats," one woman -- the sole survivor of her family -- told The Associated Press. "They came back, took out my aunt and slit her throat, after slashing open her stomach," said the woman, who identified herself only by her family's name, Benbrahin. The woman escaped through a window of her home, then hid in a nearby forest until daybreak.

Quoted by Daikha Dridi (babelmed 2003):

Everyone remembers that terrible night: “it happened a bit further down, where the disaster stricken people’s town is today. That night, they were putting projectors up to light up the forest so that they could see the terrorists, when one started to hear people screaming” says Rafiq.

== See also ==
- List of massacres in Algeria
- List of Algerian massacres of the 1990s
