= Omaria massacre =

Terrorist incident in Algeria

- Part of Algerian Civil War
- Location: El Omaria, Algeria
- Date: 23 April 1997
- Deaths: 42 villagers

The largest Omaria massacre took place on 23 April 1997 in the Algerian village of El Omaria near Médéa, south of Algiers. Attackers armed with knives, sabers, and guns killed 42 people - including 17 women and 3 babies - in 3 hours, mutilating and sometimes burning the bodies. A pregnant woman was cut open, and her baby hacked. The Haouch Khemisti massacre had taken place the day before. The violence provoked international condemnation of those responsible; US State Department spokesman Nicholas Burns declared that "these Islamic terrorists... deserve special criticism and condemnation by the world community for these despicable acts", while the Algerian FLN stated that "This barbarity is condemned by all religions, laws and morals of humanity."

A previous massacre had taken place at Omaria on 22 January 1997, in which 23 people were killed.

== See also ==
- List of massacres in Algeria
- List of Algerian massacres of the 1990s
