= Tablat =

- Commune and town
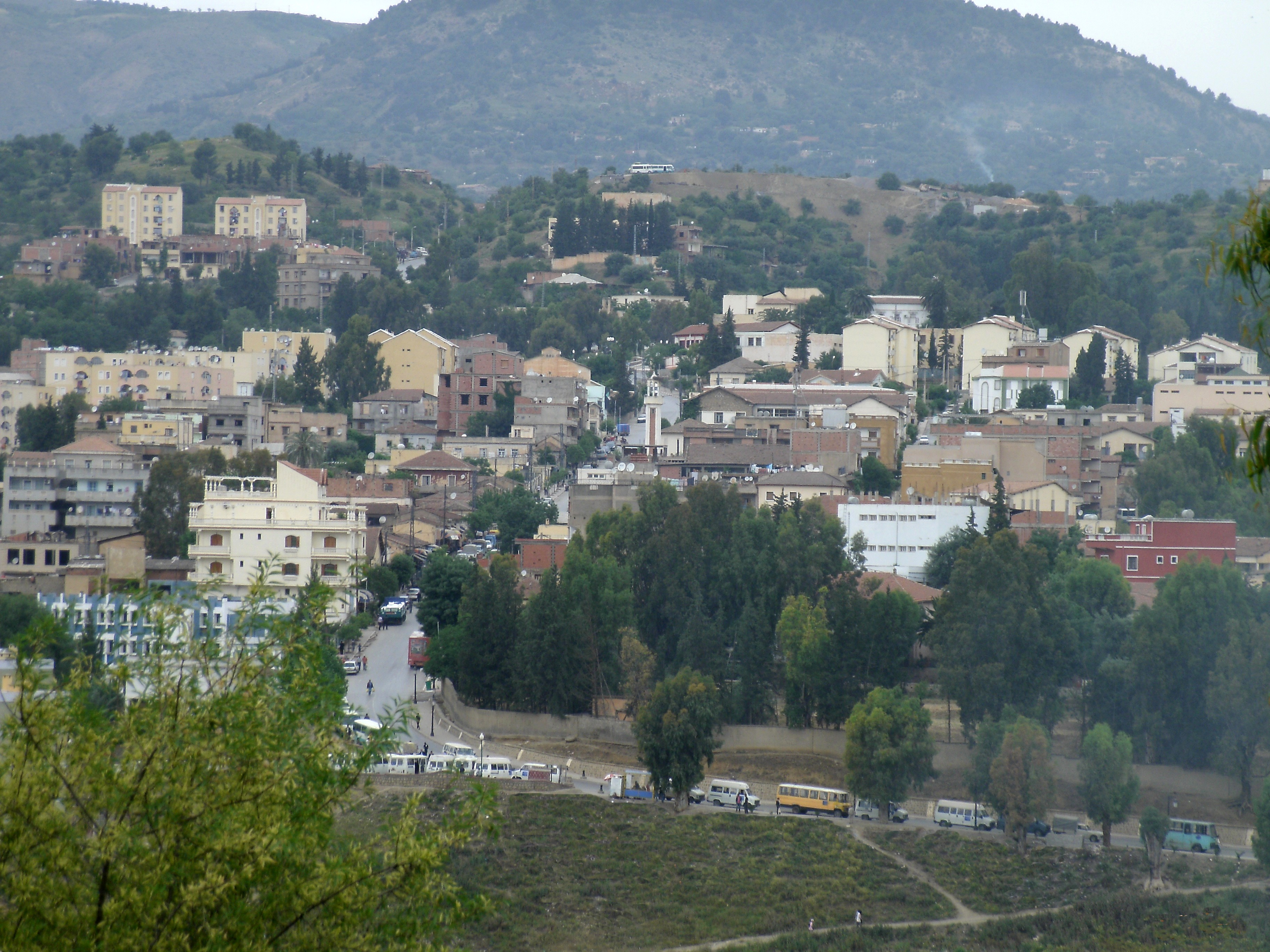

- Location within Algeria
- Coordinates: 36°24′46″N 3°18′36″E
- Country: Algeria
- Province: Médéa Province

Population (1998)
  - Total: 28,276
- Time zone: UTC+1 (CET)

Tablat is a town and commune in Médéa Province, Algeria. According to the 1998 census, it has a population of 28,276.
