= Thalit massacre =

Massacre of villagers by Islamists during the Algerian Civil War

- Part of Algerian Civil War
- Location: Thalit, Algeria
- Date: 3–4 April 1997
- Deaths: 52
- Perpetrator: Armed Islamic Group of Algeria

The Thalit massacre took place in Thalit village (Médéa, near Ksar el Boukhari), some 70 km from Algiers, on April 3–4, 1997 during the Algerian Civil War. Fifty-two out of the 53 inhabitants were killed by having their throats cut during a 12-hour rampage. The homes of the villagers were burned down afterward. The attack was attributed to "Islamist guerrillas", thought to be affiliated with the Armed Islamic Group.

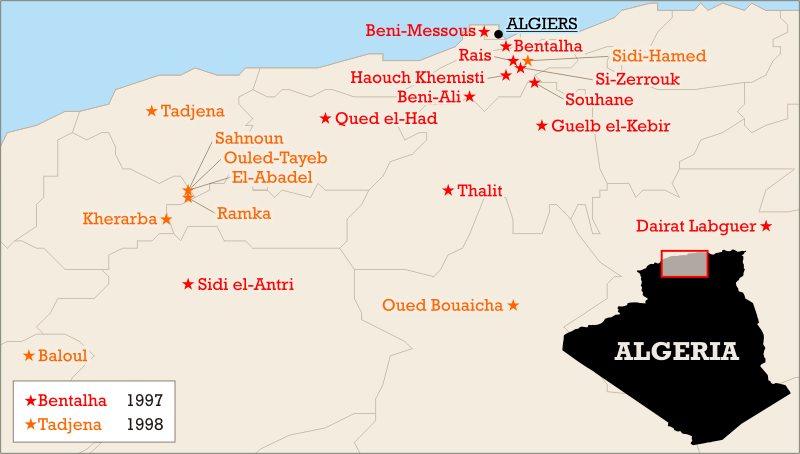
Location of massacres in Algeria 1997-1998 showing Thalit near the centre of the map.

== See also ==
- Beheading in Islam
- List of massacres during the Algerian Civil War
- List of massacres in Algeria
