= Daïat Labguer (M'sila) massacre =

1997 killing of civilians by Islamist rebels in M'sila, Algeria

M'sila massacre
- Part of Algerian Civil War
- Location: M'sila, Algeria
- Date: 16 June 1997
- Deaths: 50 villagers
- Perpetrator: Armed Islamic Group
- No. of participants: 30 militants

The Daïat Labguer (M'sila) massacre took place on June 16, 1997, near M'sila, 300 km southeast of Algiers. The massacre came less than two weeks after parliamentary elections in the hamlet of Daïat Labguer (M'sila) (also spelled Dairat Labguar, Dairat Lebguar, Daïat Labguer, Daïret Lebguer, Dairet Lebguer). Some 50 people were killed by some 30 guerrillas, who also kidnapped women, killed the livestock, and stole valuables. Five days earlier, another 17 had been killed at a village 5 km away. The massacre was attributed to Islamist groups such as the Armed Islamic Group.

== See also ==
- List of massacres in Algeria
- List of Algerian massacres of the 1990s
