= Bentalha massacre =

1997 mass killing of civilians in Bentalha, Algeria

Coordinates: 36.6483°N 3.0788°E

- Part of Algerian Civil War
- Location: Bentalha, Algeria
- Date: 22–23 September 1997
- Attack type: massacre
- Deaths: 200 to 400 villagers
- Perpetrator: Armed Islamic Group of Algeria

In the village of Bentalha (Arabic: بن طلحة), located 15 km (9.3 mi) south of Algiers, an incident occurred on the night of 22–23 September 1997, where a significant number of villagers were killed by armed guerrillas. According to Amnesty International, over 200 villagers were killed. Different sources have reported varying numbers of deaths, with estimates ranging from 85 (the initial official estimate) to 400 (The Economist) to 417 (independent sources).

== Background ==
In 1997, Algeria experienced a violent civil conflict triggered by the cancellation of the 1992 elections, which were expected to be won by the Islamic Salvation Front (FIS). Bentalha, a town located a few kilometers south of Baraki (refer to the map), a satellite town of Algiers, had voted in favor of FIS in the elections. Initially, some of the town's residents supported the Islamist guerrilla groups that emerged after the cancellation of the elections and joined their ranks. The guerrillas in the area initially consisted of the revived Armed Islamic Movement (MIA) and various independent groups. Later, these groups were assimilated into the larger Armed Islamic Group (GIA) in 1994. The army maintained a significant presence in the area, with a post at the eastern entrance of the town, several roadblocks, and barracks on the north side of Baraki. The GIA also had a strong local presence and openly roamed the streets of Bentalha between 1994 and 1996, targeting individuals associated with the government. In June 1996, the government established a "Patriot" communal guard comprising approximately ten individuals in Bentalha.

On 29 August 1997, a massacre known as the Rais massacre took place a few kilometers southeast of Bentalha, resulting in the deaths of approximately 200 people. Widespread rumors circulated that more massacres were imminent. In the ten days leading up to the event, residents reported hearing the howling of jackals (which are not native to the area) every night, and helicopters could be seen flying overhead on a daily basis.

== Massacre ==
On the night of 22 September at 11:30 p.m., explosions occurred in the Hai el-Djilali neighborhood in the southwest of Bentalha. Attackers infiltrated the area from the orange groves to the southeast of the neighborhood. They systematically went from house to house, resulting in the deaths of numerous residents. Eyewitness accounts reported that the attackers were armed with various weapons and engaged in violent acts. The event led to widespread devastation and loss of life.

According to Amnesty International, survivors reported that during the massacre, armed forces units with armored vehicles were stationed outside the village, preventing some individuals from escaping. Yacine, a survivor, stated that army vehicles appeared near the scene at midnight but did not intervene. Nesroullah Yous mentions that the army stopped locals from neighboring areas from coming to their aid. The assailants continued their conflict through Hai el-Djilali until approximately 5 a.m., when they departed without facing any opposition.

A photograph known as "The Bentalha Madonna," captured by Hocine Zaourar, gained widespread circulation and won the World Press Photo award in 1997. The image depicts a grieving Algerian woman waiting outside Zmirli Hospital and has become an iconic representation of the Bentalha massacre, similar to The Falling Soldier photograph from the Spanish Civil War.

Hocine Zaourar's award-winning photograph, known as "The Bentalha Madonna", became an iconic symbol of the massacre.

== Responsibility ==
Responsibility for the Bentalha massacre, as well as the Rais massacre, was claimed by the Armed Islamic Group (GIA) in a press release from London on 26 September, according to Agence France-Presse. Fouad Boulemia, a prominent GIA member, was sentenced to death on 1 August 2004 for his involvement in the massacre, in addition to his previous conviction for the murder of FIS leader Abdelkader Hachani. The local GIA leader, Laazraoui, was killed in October 1997, along with another GIA member, Rachid "Djeha" Ould Hamrane. Nacira, the sister of Rachid Ould Hamrane, admitted to participating in the looting of the victims' belongings and pointing out the homes of sympathizers who should be spared. She also claimed that she was coerced into cooperating under the threat of harm to her life.

One survivor, Nesroullah Yous, later emigrated to France and published a book titled Qui a tué à Bentalha? (Who Killed in Bentalha?) where he shared his experience and argued that the Algerian government had infiltrated and taken control of the GIA. Yous highlighted statements made by the attackers, suggesting that they were aware the soldiers stationed outside would not intervene and expressed little regard for religious principles. Yous believed that the circumstantial evidence strongly indicated government involvement.

Following the Bentalha massacre, there have been differing viewpoints regarding the identity of the perpetrators and their motives. Some critics argue that the known affiliation of the killers with Islamist guerrilla groups renders the question of 'who kills?' irrelevant, attributing the massacre to these groups. They have named individuals such as Laazraoui and Ould Hamrane as the leaders of the attack, with Nacira Ould Hamrane, Rachid's sister, implicated in the crime. On the other hand, there have been voices challenging the official narrative, including Yous and Habib Souaidia, who have raised questions about the involvement of armed groups and the role of state institutions in the aftermath of the massacre. Algerian TV has criticized these individuals for their stance, accusing them of attempting to exonerate armed groups and discredit state institutions.

In Western academic circles, the Bentalha massacre has sparked controversy and differing interpretations. Hugh Roberts, for instance, acknowledges the detailed account presented in "Qui a tué à Bentalha?" and recognizes that it challenges the official version of events. However, Roberts also notes that Yous does not definitively establish the involvement of a special commando or death-squad, indicating the complexity of the historical narrative surrounding the massacre.

== See also ==
- List of Algerian massacres of the 1990s
- List of massacres in Algeria
