= Haouch Khemisti massacre =

Terrorist incident in Algeria

- Part of Algerian Civil War
- Location: Near Bougara, Algeria
- Date: 22 April 1997
- Deaths: 93 villagers

The Haouch Khemisti massacre took place before dawn on April 22, 1997, in the Algerian village of Haouch Mokhfi Khemisti, some 25 km south of Algiers near Bougara. An armed group killed 93 villagers in a 3 hour long attack because they refused to "collaborate", since armed groups depended on the aid of citizens who provide food, money and other necessities for their survival. The bodies were found decapitated. A member of the family who arrived in Algiers said "We have no more to give. They've already taken everything." It was followed the next day by the Omaria massacre near Médéa.

== See also ==
- List of massacres in Algeria
- List of Algerian massacres of the 1990s
