= Sid El-Antri massacre =

1997 mass killings near Tiaret, Algeria

- Part of Algerian Civil War
- Location: Near Tiaret, Algeria
- Date: 23–24 December 1997
- Deaths: 48–117 villagers

The Sid El-Antri massacre was a mass killing of civilians in the hamlets of Shari and Sidi el Antar, near Tiaret, Algeria, on the night of 23-24 December 1997, during the Algerian Civil War. Contemporary reports gave sharply different casualty figures. Algerian authorities said that 48 people were killed near Tiaret, while newspaper reports placed the toll for the two hamlets at between 81 and 120 dead. The victims included large numbers of women and children.

== Background ==
The massacre took place during a late-1997 wave of large-scale village killings in Algeria. Human Rights Watch later wrote that the massacres that began in August 1997 continued into early 1998 and were concentrated in isolated communities around Algiers and in western Algeria. Outrage focused both on the perpetrators, who were initially identified in much reporting as the Armed Islamic Group (GIA), and on the security forces' failure to protect civilians.

== Massacre ==
A statement broadcast on Algerian state radio said that gunmen killed 48 people near Tiaret and 11 others in a separate attack at Bainem on the edge of Algiers. The authorities blamed the killings on "terrorists", their standard term for Islamist insurgents.

Press reports described a significantly higher toll in the Tiaret area. El País, citing Algerian security services and local newspapers, reported that the press put the overall death toll from the Tiaret killings at between 81 and 120, including 15 children. The Irish Times reported that 28 villagers were killed in Shari and 53 in neighbouring Sidi el Antar; those reported killed in Shari included 15 children, a six-month-old baby, an 88-year-old man and five women. Contemporary accounts of the attack on Shari said that many victims had their throats slit and their bodies hacked to pieces.

== Aftermath ==
The killings were followed within two days by another massacre in nearby Zouabria, where Reuters reported that 26 or 27 villagers were killed. The same Reuters report said Algerian newspapers had described the earlier killings in Shari and Sidi el Antar as similar massacres in neighbouring villages, while the government maintained its lower official toll of 48 dead for the Tiaret attacks. In early January 1998, Amnesty International said that official casualty figures in Algeria were consistently lower than those reported by the press and eyewitnesses, and renewed its call for an international investigation into the massacres. Human Rights Watch later described the late-1997 village massacres as a major source of domestic and international outrage because of both the brutality of the attacks and the security forces' failure to protect civilians.

== See also ==
- List of massacres in Algeria
