= Guelb El-Kebir massacre =

1997 killing of civilians in the Algerian province of Medea

Coordinates: 36°14′46.9″N 3°24′29.9″E

- Part of Algerian Civil War
- Location: Guelb El-Kebir, Algeria
- Date: 20 September 1997
- Deaths: 53 villagers

The Guelb El-Kebir massacre took place in the village of Guelb el-Kebir, near Beni Slimane, in the Algerian province of Medea, on 20 September 1997. 53 people were killed by attackers that were not immediately identified, though the attack was similar to others carried out by Islamic groups opposed to the Algerian government.

== See also ==
- List of massacres in Algeria
