= Oued El-Had and Mezouara massacre =

1997 killing of civilians by guerillas in Arib, Ain Defla, Algeria

- Part of Algerian Civil War
- Location: Arib, Algeria
- Date: 2 August 1997
- Deaths: 100–200 villagers

The Oued El-Had and Mezouara massacre took place on August 2, 1997. This massacre occurred between two villages near Arib in the wilaya of Tipaza and Ain Defla, Algeria. Around 100 people were killed as a result of the massacre. This massacre was one of the bloodiest since the start of terrorism in Algeria. Algeria-Watch's timeline describes them as strange guerrillas with shaven heads and eyebrows, carrying flags emblazoned "al-ghadhibun 'ala Allah" (Angry at God).

== Massacre ==
On the afternoon of August 2, 1997, around 100 armed unidentified men split into two groups to best execute their plan. One group started in the wilayah of Aïn-Defia, and the other group started in the wilayah of Tipaza. Both groups were following the valley that would lead to Oued El-Had.

The groups would storm the houses of these towns and would kill men, women, children, cows, goats, and donkeys. They would then only spare one adult to act as a guide for them to find and attack the next village. When the groups arrived in the next village, they would proceed in doing the same thing, except this time killing their old guide and sparing someone else to act as their new guide. The people in the villages who would try to flee would be shot down or brutally attacked with a knife or ax, as was later observed on the corpses by investigators of the massacre.

After having had countless guides, both groups eventually meet up in Oued El-Had and continue their plan to kill all citizens. After they killed the people of Oued El-Had, the total number of people killed was in the hundreds range, and around 100 others were left injured as a result of these attacks, but these numbers could be much higher. Although in the press reports, they reported only 50 casualties which is much lower than what Journalist Abed Charef had written in his book Autopsy of a Massacre. The number was lowballed as a result of authorities remaining silent on the matter and falsifying the reports to prevent a further investigation into the matter occur.

== Responsibility ==
In the region where the attacks occurred, it has a heavy presence of both the AIS and the GIA. But, none of them ever came forward to confess that they were responsible for this massacre. Abed Charef came to his conclusion that another “new uncontrolled group had appeared in the region” and was thus responsible for the massacre. The AIS and GIA also had good relations with the local population around them and would have never committed such atrocities. The culprit of this massacre is unknown as information on the massacre has been either fabricated or erased, thus making it hard to pinpoint who exactly was responsible for this massacre.

== See also ==
- List of massacres in Algeria
