= Si Zerrouk massacre =

1997 mass killing in Larbaa, Algeria

- Part of Algerian Civil War
- Location: Si Zerrouk, Algeria
- Date: 27 July 1997
- Deaths: 47–58
- Perpetrator: Armed Islamic Group of Algeria
- No. of participants: 30–100

The Si Zerrouk massacre took place in the Si Zerrouk neighborhood in the south of Larbaa in Algeria on 27 July 1997. About 50 people were killed.

== Background ==
In 1997, Algeria was at the peak of a civil conflict that had begun after the military's cancellation of 1992 elections set to be won by the Islamic Salvation Front (FIS). Two major Islamist guerrilla groups, Armed Islamic Group (GIA) and AIS, and several minor ones, were fighting the government. Larbaa was a major center for the FIS's armed wing, the Islamic Salvation Army (AIS), which the GIA had recently declared war on; Mustapha Kartali, a former GIA chief who had split from him in 1995 and become head of the AIS's Katibat Errahamane brigade, was based in the area.

== Massacre ==
On the afternoon of 27 July 1997, the electricity went out. That night, a number of guerrillas armed with shotguns, knives, and sabres (30 according to The Economist, 100 according to Liberte) stormed into the area by night and started breaking into homes and cutting the residents' throats, killing men, women, and babies, and burning some victims alive. They also blew up their houses. About 50 people (most papers reported 47; Le Matin reported 58) were killed.

The massacre was presumed to be the work of the GIA. According to Robert Moore of The Observer as quoted by Ahmed Bouzid in Zmag: "in the village of Larbaa the attack took place 300 yards from a large barracks." The New York Times confirms that "the electricity had been cut in the town before the assault and the attack occurred close to an army barracks" (Roger Cohen, "Despite freeing of a militant, no letup in Algerian strife", The New York Times, 2 August 1997, as cited by Algeria-Watch).

== See also ==
- List of massacres in Algeria
