= Beni Ali massacre =

1997 mass killing in Algeria

- Part of Algerian Civil War
- Location: Beni Ali, Algeria
- Date: 26 August 1997
- Attack type: Terrorist attack
- Deaths: 64 to 100

The Beni Ali massacre took place in the mountain hamlet of Beni Ali, 40 miles (64 km) south of Algiers near Chrea, on 26 August 1997. Sixty-four (according to The New York Times and CNN) or 100 people (according to Amnesty International) were killed in a terrorist attack. Three days later came the larger Rais massacre.

== See also ==
- List of massacres in Algeria
