= Rais massacre =

1997 mass killing by the Armed Islamic Group of Algeria

- Part of Algerian Civil War
- Location: 36.613°N 3.124°E; Rais, Algiers Province, Algeria
- Date: 28 August 1997
- Deaths: 98 to 400 villagers 800 killed according to the BBC
- Injuries: 120
- Perpetrator: Armed Islamic Group of Algeria

The Rais massacre was a massacre carried out during the Algerian civil war. It took place on 28 August 1997 and was conducted by the Armed Islamic Group of Algeria against the village of Rais, near Sidi Moussa and south of Algiers. The initial official death toll was 98 people killed and 120 wounded; CNN said that hospital workers and witnesses gave a toll of at least 200, and up to 400. The figure given by the Algerian government to the UN Commission on Human Rights was 238. The BBC later quoted the figure of 800 killed.

In 1997, Algeria was at the peak of a brutal civil conflict that had begun after the military's cancellation of 1992 elections set to be won by the Islamic Salvation Front (FIS). The poor farming village of Rais had mostly voted for FIS and had a history of supporting Islamist guerrillas in the region, but (according to a villager quoted by PBS) had recently stopped providing them with food and money.

== Massacre ==
The hooded attackers arrived about 1 a.m. in trucks and cars, armed with shotguns, knives, axes, and bombs. They continued killing the village's men, women, children, and even animals until dawn (about 6 a.m.), cutting throats and taking the time to burn corpses; young women, however, were abducted instead of being killed. In some cases, they left severed heads on doorsteps. They mutilated and stole from the dead, and committed atrocities against pregnant women. They burned and bombed some houses. The villagers tried to flee or hide. Army units stayed outside the village, shooting at fleeing villagers, but not attempting to enter the village until after the attackers, carrying away some 20 young women, left at dawn.

Responsibility was claimed for this, as for the Bentalha massacre, by the Armed Islamic Group (GIA). In An Inquiry into the Algerian Massacres (a book arguing that the GIA had become a tool of the state) two survivors are quoted as reporting that the killers were dressed like "Afghans", with turbans, covered faces, beards (some false), and uniforms, that the attackers were also cursing God throughout, and that among them were a few women, wearing hijab over a uniform. These accounts (which can be read below) appear not to be corroborated by major media outlets.

The government vowed to "continue to struggle without mercy against the barbarous criminals until their eradication", announcing a massive manhunt and new measures to reinforce rural security. Amnesty International expressed concern regarding the government response, noting that "the massacre site is surrounded by army barracks and security forces posts, located between a few hundreds metres and a few kilometers away", including an army barracks 100 metres away, and quoting a survivor as saying "The army and the security forces were right there; they heard and saw everything and did nothing, and they let the terrorists leave." AI interviewed another survivor and they mentioned how "in addition to the security forces barracks nearby, security forces’ units were also stationed just outside the village, and were aware that the massacre was being committed because those who were able to flee at the beginning of the attack had gone to seek help and refuge with the nearby security forces." The Prime Minister, Ahmed Ouyahia, retorted to ITN that "the army, the national guard intervened, intervened as quickly as it was possible." The authorities cited concern regarding the possible presence of mines and ambushes; however, a rescue worker interviewed by Human Rights Watch said that the first gendarmes there had not taken any precautions against possible mines as they drove in.

The Algerian government told the UN Commission on Human Rights that "A judicial inquiry was opened by the Larbâa court and the four perpetrators of the massacre identified. Search warrants were issued by the examining magistrate on 30 May 1998." How four attackers killed 238 people is not made clear.

The village's population had already dropped from 1000 before the conflict began to 200 after the massacre; many of the remainder left following this massacre. Some of those who remained were given arms by the government for future self-defense, according to La Tribune, which quotes residents opposing Abdelaziz Bouteflika's amnesty to certain members of the armed groups (the Law of National Reconciliation), fearing that it would include murderers like those who killed their neighbors.

== Eyewitness quotes ==
Mrs. Bachiri, a victim of the Rais massacre, testified on the deaths of her sixteen brothers and their children before members of the Algerian League for the Defence of Human Rights (LADDH):

"They slaughtered him along with his seven children. They slit their throats. He is blind the poor guy… a blind man… what could he have done to deserve this? He is married to a lady who is not totally fit mentally. She gave him two sons and two daughters. The sons were dragged outside with their father and had their throats slit, whereas the daughters were taken away. One was twenty-eight years old, the other was twenty-four. 'why would they want to kill me? What did I do? They told him: 'come out, we want a word with you'. When he came out they were there… with military uniforms and toting their guns. There were a few women with them. The women were wearing the hijab over a military uniform.

One of the soldiers cut the finger of one of Amara’s daughters and said to his colleague: 'take the gold, take the gold'. Amara’s 2-year-old granddaughter was found burnt in the oven. His old daughter [the guest], was slaughtered too… she was lying on the ground… they put one of her sons on her right arm, another son on the left arm and they shouted 'Allah Akfar'… We say: Allah Akbar [Allah is the greatest]' but they were saying 'Allah Akfar' [Allah is the worst of the unbelievers]. They came in cars, in Landrovers… People who stayed at home were slaughtered, and those who went out were shot dead."

Quote from an unnamed survivor of the Rais massacre to Amnesty International:

“Why did this happen? Why didn’t anyone stop it? There is no law any more. The army and the security forces were right there; they heard and saw everything and did nothing, and they let the terrorists leave.... They [the army] waited for the terrorists to finish their dirty task and then they let them leave. What does this mean to you? ...... I had been threatened by the fundamentalists but I almost got killed by the army. Even my friends in the army don’t understand anything anymore these days...”.

== See also ==
- List of massacres in Algeria
- List of Algerian massacres of the 1990s
