= Armed Islamic Group of Algeria =

1993–2004 Islamist insurgent group in the Algerian Civil War

Armed Islamic Group الجماعة الإسلامية المسلّحة
- Logo of the GIA
- Leaders: Mansour Meliani: July 1992, arrested that same month.; Abdelhak Layada: (POW) from January 1993 to May 1993; Seif Allah Djaafar †aka Mourad Si Ahmed, aka Djaafar al-Afghani: from August 1993 until his death February 26, 1994.; Cherif Gousmi †aka Abu Abdallah Ahmed: from March 10, 1994, to his death in combat on September 26, 1994.; Djamel Zitouni †: from October 27, 1994, until July 16, 1996.; Antar Zouabri †: from 1996 to 9 February 2002.; Rachid Abou Tourab †: killed July 2004.; Boulenouar Oukil: arrested 29 April 2005.; Nourredine Boudiafi: arrested sometime in November 2004.
- Dates active: 1993–2004
- Active regions: Algeria, France
- Ideology: Qutbism; Islamism; Jihadism; Islamic fundamentalism
- Wars: Algerian Civil War

The Armed Islamic Group (GIA, from French: Groupe Islamique Armé; Arabic: الجماعة الإسلامية المسلّحة, romanized: al-Jamāʿa al-ʾIslāmiyya al-Musallaḥa) was one of the two main Islamist insurgent groups that fought the Algerian government and army in the Algerian Civil War.

It was created from smaller armed groups following the 1992 military coup and the arrest and internment of thousands of officials in the Islamic Salvation Front (FIS) party after it won the first round of parliamentary elections in December 1991. It was led by a succession of amirs (commanders) who were killed or arrested one after another. Unlike the other main armed groups, the Islamic Armed Movement (MIA) and the Islamic Salvation Army (AIS), the GIA sought not to bargain with the government, but to overthrow it and "purge the land of the ungodly" in its pursuit of an Islamic state. The slogan inscribed on all its communiques was: "no agreement, no truce, no dialogue". GIA's ideology was inspired by the Jihadist writings of the Egyptian Islamist scholar Sayyid Qutb.

The group desired to create "an atmosphere of general insecurity" and employed kidnapping, assassination, and bombings, including car bombs, and targeted security forces and civilians. Between 1992 and 1998, the GIA conducted a violent campaign of civilian massacres, sometimes wiping out entire villages in its area of operation (notably in Bentalha and Rais). It attacked and killed other Islamists who had left the GIA or attempted to negotiate with the government. It also targeted foreign civilians living in Algeria, killing more than 100 expatriate men and women.

The group also established a presence in France, Belgium, Britain, Italy, and the United States. It launched terror attacks in France in 1994 and 1995. While it was the "undisputed principal Islamist force" in Algeria in 1994, militants were deserting "in droves" by 1996, alienated by its execution of civilians and Islamist leaders.

In 1999, a government amnesty law motivated large numbers of jihadis to "repent". The remnants of the GIA proper were hunted down over the next two years, leaving a splinter group the Salafist Group for Preaching and Combat (GSPC), which announced its support for Al-Qaeda in October 2003. The extent to which the group was infiltrated and manipulated by Algerian security services is disputed.

The GIA is considered a terrorist organisation by the governments of Algeria, France, the United States, Argentina, Bahrain, Japan, New Zealand, the United Kingdom, and the United Nations. The GIA remains a Proscribed Organisation in the United Kingdom under the Terrorism Act 2000. Canada listed GIA as a terrorist entity until 18 June 2024.

== History ==
=== Founding ===
According to Algerian veterans of the Afghan jihad who founded the GIA, the idea of forming an armed group to fight jihad against the Algerian government was developed not after the coup, but after leaders of the MIA were freed from prison in 1989. The idea was not acted on then due to the spectacular electoral political success of the FIS. Embracing Sayyid Qutb's takfir (excommunication) of secular governments and assertion that engaging in armed jihad against Jaahili societies was mandatory; GIA leaders condemned the FLN regime as apostates and called upon Algerians to rise up, pledge allegiance to them, and violently overthrow the socialist government in pursuit of establishing an Islamic state in Algeria. The support base of the GIA mainly consisted of the educationally and economically underprivileged classes of Algerian society.

Early in 1992, Mansour Meliani, a former aid to Bouyali, along with many "Afghans", broke with his former friend Abdelkader Heresay and left the MIA, founding his own Jihadi group around July 1992. Meliani was arrested in July and executed in August 1993. He was replaced by Mohammed Allal, aka Moh Leveilley, who was killed on 1 September 1992 by the Algerian military when it attacked a meeting held to unify command of the jihad.

In the early 1990s, the economic state of Algeria was dire. 41% of Algerians ages 15–24 were unemployed in 1990. Young Algerians were a main part of the GIA; it was able to "enlist young Algerians who felt overall excluded from mainstream society and the country’s political life", according to a study from the Centre for the Study of Violence and Reconciliation.

==== Abdelhak Layada ====
Leveilley was replaced in January 1993 by Abdelhak Layada, who declared his group independent of the FIS and MIA and not obedient to its orders. It adopted the radical Omar El-Eulmi as a spiritual guide, and Layada affirmed that "political pluralism is equivalent to sedition". He also believed jihad in Algeria was fard ayn, or an individual obligation of adult male Muslims. Layada threatened not just security forces but journalists ("grandsons of France") and the families of Algerian soldiers. From its inception on, the GIA called for and implemented the killing of anyone collaborating with or supporting the authorities, including government employees such as teachers and civil servants. Layada did not last long and was arrested in Morocco in May 1993.

Besides the GIA, the other major branch of the Algerian resistance was the MIA. It was led by the ex-soldier "General" Abdelkader Chebouti, and was "well-organized and structured and favored a long-term jihad" targeting the state and its representatives and based on a guerrilla campaign like that of the War of Independence. From prison, Ali Benhadj issued a fatwa giving the MIA his blessing. In March 2006, Abdelhak Layada was released from prison, amnesty measures provided for in the Charter for Peace and Reconciliation launched by the president, Abdelaziz Bouteflika, even offering himself as a mediator to seek a truce between the government and the Salafist Group for Preaching and Combat.

==== Djafar al-Afghani ====
On August 21, 1993, Seif Allah Djafar, aka Mourad Si Ahmed, aka Djafar al-Afghani, a 30-year-old black marketer with no education beyond primary school, became GIA amir. Violence escalated under Djafar, as did the GIA's base of support outside of Algeria.

Under him, the group named and assassinated specific journalists and intellectuals (such as Tahar Djaout), saying that "The journalists who fight against Islamism through the pen will perish by the sword." The GIA explicitly affirmed that it "did not represent the armed wing of the FIS", and issued death threats against several FIS and MIA members, including MIA's Heresay and FIS's Kebir and Redjam.

About the time al-Afghani took power of GIA, a group of Algerian jihadists returning from Afghanistan came to London. Together with Islamist intellectual Abu Qatada, they started up a weekly magazine, Usrat al-Ansar as a GIA propaganda outlet. Abu Qatada "provided the intellectual and ideological firepower" to justify GIA actions, and the journal became "a trusted source of news and information about the GIA for Islamists around the world."

The GIA soon broadened its attacks to civilians who refused to live by their prohibitions, and then foreigners living in Algeria. A hostage released on 31 October 1993 carried a message ordering foreigners to "leave the country. We are giving you one month. Anyone who exceeds that period will be responsible for his own sudden death." By the end of 1993 26 foreigners had been killed.

In November 1993 Sheik Mohamed Bouslimani "a popular figure who was prominent" in Hamas party of Mahfoud Nahnah was kidnapped and executed after "refusing to issue a fatwa endorsing the GIA's tactics."

Djafar was killed by French security forces on December 26, 1994 during the raid on Air France flight 8969.

==== Cherif Gousmi ====
Cherif Gousmi, aka Abu Abdallah Ahmed, became amir March 10, 1994. Under him, the GIA reached its "high water mark", and became the "undisputed principal Islamist force" in Algeria. In May, Islamist leaders Abderrezak Redjam (allegedly representing the FIS), Mohammed Said, the exiled Anwar Haddam, and the MEI's Said Makhloufi joined the GIA; a blow to the FIS and surprise since the GIA had been issuing death threats against the three since November 1993. This was interpreted by many observers as either the result of intra-FIS competition or as an attempt to change the GIA's course from within. On 26 August, the group declared a "Caliphate", or Islamic government for Algeria, with Gousmi as Commander of the Faithful, Mohammed Said as head of government, the US-based Haddam as foreign minister, and Mekhloufi as provisional interior minister.

However, the very next day Said Mekhloufi announced his withdrawal from the GIA, claiming that the GIA had deviated from Islam and that this "Caliphate" was an effort by Mohammed Said to take over the GIA, and Haddam soon afterwards denied ever having joined it, asserting that this Caliphate was an invention of the security services. The GIA continued attacking its usual targets, notably assassinating artists, such as Cheb Hasni, and in late August added a new one to its list, threatening schools which allowed mixed classes, music, gym for girls, or not wearing hijab with arson. He was killed in combat on September 26, 1994.

==== Djamel Zitouni ====
Cherif Gousmi was eventually succeeded by Djamel Zitouni who became GIA head on October 27, 1994. He was the responsible for carrying out a series of bombings in France in 1995. He was killed by a rival faction on July 16, 1996.

==== Antar Zouabri and takfir ====
Antar Zouabri was the longest serving "emir" of the GIA (1996–2002), nominated by a faction "considered questionable by the others". The 26-year-old activist was a "close confidant" of Zitouni and continued his policy of "ever increasing violence and redoubled purges". Zouabri opened his reign as emir by issuing a manifesto entitled The Sharp Sword, presenting Algerian society as resistant to jihad and lamented that the majority of the people had "forsaken religion and renounced the battle against its enemies," but was careful to deny that the GIA had ever accused Algerian society itself of impiety (kufr).

Convinced of Zouabri's salafist orthodoxy, Egyptian veteran of the Afghan jihad Abu Hamza restarted the Al-Ansar bulletin/magazine in London. During the month of Ramadan (January–February 1997), hundreds of civilians were killed in massacres some with their throats cut. The massacres continued for months and culminated in August and September when hundreds of men, women and children were killed in the villages of Rais, Bentalha, and Beni Messous. Pregnant women were sliced open, children were hacked to pieces or dashed against walls, men's limbs were hacked off one by one, and, as the attackers retreated, they would kidnap young women to keep as sex slaves. The GIA issued a communiques signed by Zouabri claiming responsibility for the massacres and justifying them—in contradiction to his manifesto—by declaring impious (takfir) all those Algerians who had not joined its ranks. In London, Abu Hamzu criticised the communique and two days later (September 29) announced the end of his support and the closure of the bulletin, cutting off GIA's communication with the international Islamist community and the rest of the outside world. In Algeria, the slaughters drained the GIA of popular support (although evidence showed security forces cooperated with the killers preventing civilians from escaping, and may even have controlled the GIA). A week earlier the AIS insurgents announced it would declare a unilateral truce starting in October. These events marked the end of "organized jihad in Algeria," according to one source by Gilles Kepel.

Although Zouabri was seldom heard of after this and the jihad exhausted, massacres "continued unabated" through 1998 led by independent amirs with added "ingredients of vendetta and local dispute" to the putative jihad against the government. Armed groups "that had formerly belonged to the GIA" continued to kill, some replacing jihad with simple banditry, others settling scores with the pro-government "patriots" or others, some enlisting themselves in the services of landowners and frightening illegal occupants off of property.

In 1999 the "Law on Civil Concord" granting amnesty to fighters was officially rejected by the GIA but accepted by many rank-and-file Islamist fighters; an estimated 85 percent surrendered their arms and returned to civilian life.

The Salafist Group for Preaching and Combat (GSPC) splinter faction appears to have eclipsed the GIA since approximately 1998 and is currently assessed by the CIA to be the most effective armed group remaining inside Algeria. Both the GIA and GSPC leadership continue to proclaim their rejection of President Bouteflika's amnesty, but in contrast to the GIA, the GSPC has stated that it avoids attacks on civilians.

Zouabri was himself killed in a gun battle with security forces 9 February 2002. The GIA, torn by splits and desertions and denounced by all sides even in the Islamist movement, was slowly destroyed by army operations over the next few years; by the time of Antar Zouabri's death it was effectively incapacitated.

=== The GIA and violence ===
In Algeria, the desire to have a violent and armed version of Islamism was not the primary mode of action for the GIA. The GIA did not see violence as a form of sacrifice or martyrdom, which is quite common in other Islamist groups. Rather, the GIA used violence as an instrument of change and a method for initiating a social transformation within Algeria. The state, in the eyes of the GIA, was an enemy of Islam and an incarnation of taghout. In order to destroy it, they would organize rural and urban guerrillas, overthrow the state through an insurgency, and create a new regime based on Sharia law.

In order to destabilize the state, the GIA instigated terror throughout the country, using acts of violence such as planned assassinations, vehicle bombings, and kidnappings. They often attacked members of the Algerian army and the police force. As time passed the GIA did not limit their violence to only state officials. They used violence as a means of social control on the civilian population as well. They would commit theatrical assassinations in front of large groups of people so they could spread fear and spur people into supporting their cause. Two notable assassinations by the GIA were the murders of Abdelkader Alloula, a theater director in Algeria, and Cheb Hasni, the most popular Raï music singer.

=== Endgame ===
In 1999, following the election of a new president, Abdelaziz Bouteflika, a new law gave amnesty to most guerrillas, motivating large numbers to "repent" and return to normal life. The violence declined substantially after Antar Zouabri was killed in 2002, Rachid Abou Tourab succeeded him and was allegedly killed by close aides in July 2004. He was replaced by Boulenouar Oukil. By 2004, GIA membership had dwindled, and they only had around 30 members left. On 7 April 2005, the GIA was reported to have killed 14 civilians at a fake road block. Three weeks later on 29 April, Oukil was arrested. Nourredine Boudiafi was the last known "emir" of the GIA. He was arrested sometime in November 2004, his arrest was announced by the Algerian government in January 2005.

A splinter group of the GIA that formed on the fringes of Kabylie (north central coast) in 1998, called the Salafist Group for Preaching and Combat (GSPC), rejected the amnesty. It dissociated itself from the previous indiscriminate killing of civilians and reverted to the classic MIA-AIS tactics of targeting combatant forces. This break away was led by Hassan Hattab. In October 2003, they announced their support for Al-Qaeda and in 2006, Ayman al-Zawahiri announced a "blessed union" between the two groups. In 2007, the group changed its name to Al-Qaeda in the Islamic Maghreb. It has focused on kidnapping for ransom as a means of raising funds and is estimated to have raised more than $50 million from 2003 to 2013.

== Claims of Algerian Government involvement ==
Various claims have been made that the GIA was heavily infiltrated at top level by agents of Algerian intelligence such as the Département du Renseignement et de la Sécurité (DRS), who drove the organisation towards excessive violence against civilians in order to undermine its popular support.

According to Heba Saleh of BBC News,

Algerian opposition sources allege that the group may have been manipulated at times by elements within ruling military and intelligence circles. A series of massacres in the summer of 1997 - in which many hundreds of people were killed - took place near Algerian army barracks, but no-one came to the help of the victims.

Fouad Ajami writing in The New Republic in 2010: called the GIA "a bastard child of the encounter between the Islamists and the security services of the regime." John Schindler in The National Interest stated, "Much of GIA's leadership consisted of DRS agents, who drove the group into the dead end of mass murder"

Another source, journalist Nafeez Ahmed claims that 'Yussuf-Joseph'—an anonymous 14-year "career secret agent" in Algeria's sécurité militaire who defected to Britain in 1997 and claims to have had access to "all the secret telexes"—told Ahmed that GIA atrocities were not the work of 'Islamic extremists', but were 'orchestrated' by 'Mohammed Mediane, head of the Algerian secret service', and 'General Smain Lamari', head of 'the counter intelligence agency' and ... 'In 1992 Smain created a special group, L'Escadron de la Mort (the Squadron of Death)... The death squads organized the massacres ... ' including 'at least' two of the bombs in Paris in summer 1995. That operation was (allegedly) 'run by Colonel Souames Mahmoud, alias Habib, head of the secret service at the Algerian embassy in Paris.' According to Ahmed, "Joseph's testimony has been corroborated by numerous defectors from the Algerian secret services." (Ahmed also claims that the "British intelligence believed the Algerian Government was involved in atrocities, contradicting the view the Government was claiming in public".)

However, according to Andrew Whitley of Human Rights Watch, "It was clear that armed Islamist groups were responsible for many of the killings of both civilians and security force members that had been attributed to them by the authorities. According to the Shadow Report on Algeria, Algerians such as Zazi Sadou, have collected testimonies by survivors that their attackers were unmasked and were recognised as local radicals - in one case even an elected member of the FIS.

According to Max Abrahms, "the false flag allegation arose because the civilian attacks hurt the GIA—not because of any evidence" to support it. Abrahms describes the proliferation of false flag conspiracy theories, such as 9/11 conspiracy theories, as a commonplace reaction to the generally counterproductive effects of terrorist violence, but notes that it is a fallacy to assume that the perpetrators and beneficiaries of terrorism must be the same. Abrahms cites Mohammed Hafez, an academic expert on the subject who concluded: "The evidence does not support the claim that security forces were the principal culprits behind the massacres, or even willing conspirators in the barbaric violence against civilians. Instead, the evidence points to the GIA as the principal perpetrator of the massacres."

== See also ==
- Murder of the monks of Tibhirine
- Abdelkader Mokhtari
