= Smain Lamari =

Head of Algerian Intelligence (1941-2007)

- Born: Smain Lamari; June 14, 1941; El Harrach, Algeria
- Died: August 28, 2007 (aged 66)
- Military career
- Allegiance: Algeria
- Branch: Algerian People's Army
- Service years: 1959 – 2007
- Rank: Major General
- Unit: 8th Infantry Regiment

Major General Smain Lamari (Arabic: إسماعيل العماري, 1941 – August 28, 2007) was the head of an Algerian intelligence service, the Department of Counter-Espionage and Internal Security.

Along with Generals Mohamed Lamari (unrelated to him), Khaled Nezzar, Larbi Belkheir and "Toufik" Médiène, he was one of the influential "Algerian Generals". Lamari was close to Larbi Belkheir, now ambassador in Morocco.

Lamari died from a heart attack in 2007, and was buried in the Cemetery El Alia reserved for high ranking Algerian officials, in the presence of President Abdelaziz Bouteflika.

== Career ==
Born in Ain Bessam (Algeria) in 1941, the son of a taxi-driver from the Titteri region, he quit high school to join the National Liberation Army during the Algerian War of Independence (reportedly in 1959). After a brief period in the police and marines, he spent most of his career in various Algerian intelligence services – the SM, DGPS and DRS. His photo was never published in the Algerian press — the only photo available of Lamari was published by the MAOL opposition group (Algerian Free Officers' Movement). In 1991, he ordered the arrest of Islamic Salvation Front (FIS) members Abassi Madani and Ali Benhadj.

=== Algerian Civil War ===
Lamari was one of the Generals, along with Mohammed Touati, who forced President Chadli Bendjedid to resign in January 1992, and who cancelled the legislative election won by the FIS. During the Algerian Civil War, he became head of the Department of Counter-Espionage and Internal Security (DSI). He was in charge of secret operations against Islamist guerrillas and counter-espionage — a post which he occupied until his death, untouched by changes of government or reshuffles. In this capacity, he played a major part in infiltrating guerrilla organisations, especially the Armed Islamic Groups (GIA), and liaising with the French security services. According to Mohammed Samraoui, a former officer, Lamari declared, in May 1992, before several officers: "I am ready to eliminate three million of Algerians if necessary to maintain the order threatened by the Islamists.".

Lamari's successes in the war against the Islamists included the elimination of the first core of the GIA (Meliani, Chebouti and Bâa Azzedine), infiltration of terrorist maquis (in particular in Chrea), and the destruction of the FIDA commandos which assassinated many intellectuals, journalists and artists between 1992 and 1994.

Rumors claimed that President Mohamed Boudiaf, assassinated in June 1992, had envisioned to get rid of Lamari. The Algerian Free Officers' Movement (MAOL), an opposition group in exile, controversially accused Lamari of playing a key role in organising the assassination of President Boudiaf, and of personally choosing Lembarek Boumaarafi as the assassin.

These rumors concerning Boudiaf's projects were shared with the French secret services, to whom Lamari entertained close links, especially with General Rondot and the DST. Among other contacts, Rondot had spoken to Lamari in relation with the Martyrs of Atlas's Affair. Yves Bonnet, the head of the DST, had required assistance against Islamic terrorism to his Algerian counterparts, and Smain Lamari was delegated by Mohamed Mediene, in charge of the DRS, to be the French's interlocutor. A legend claims that Lamari was the one who provided information to the French which led to the capture of Carlos the Jackal in Sudan. Beside being a friend of Rondot, Lamari was also close to the prefect Jean-Charles Marchiani, one of Pasqua's men.

Furthermore, the DCE, headed by Lamari, assisted Western intelligence services in the struggle against Al Qaeda long before the September 11, 2001 attacks.

=== National Reconciliation program ===
Despite Lamari's adamant opposition to the Islamists and his membership in the Eradicateurs camp (Eradicators), he played a key role in the negotiations with the AIS, the armed front of the FIS, beginning in 2000. He convinced Madani Mezrag's men to surrender their arms.

=== Pharmalliance SARL ===
Lamari's daughter, Amal Lamari, founded Pharmalliance SARL in 1997 (soon after graduating from university) and is its director-general. She received the 20,250 m^{2} (218,000 sq ft) site in Ouled Fayet (near Algiers) on which the Pharmalliance factory is built from the government through laws meant to encourage investment, while her father personally received a 1,035 m^{2} (11,140 sq ft) plot of land in Hydra (a prestigious neighbourhood of Algiers) by a special decree.

== Funeral ==
Smain Lamari was buried in the Quartier des Martyrs in the El Alia Cemetery, in presence of most of Algeria's policy makers. Beside President Abdelaziz Bouteflika, the ministers Abdelmalek Sellal, Chérif Rahmani, and Noureddine Moussa attended his funeral. The President of the Senate, Abdelkader Bensalah, was also there, as well as Ahmed Ouyahia (twice Prime Minister), General Khaled Nezzar, former Prime Minister Mouloud Hamrouche, Issad Rebrab. Allegations were made that the Islamist Abdelhak Layada, co-founder of the GIA, was also present, as well as Lamari's boss, General Toufik.

== Sources ==
- "Algeria Interface: Smain Lamari". Archived from the original on May 13, 2004.
- Mafia-DZ: Smain Lamari
- Smain Lamari: Blood and business
