= Janviérists =

The Janviérists (French: Janviéristes) and sometimes called the Decision-makers or Deciders (French: Decideurs) refer to the group of Algerian generals who made the decision on January 11, 1992 to interrupt the second round of the 1991 Algerian parliamentary election scheduled for January 16. Had the second round taken place, it would have resulted in a landslide victory for the Islamist Islamic Salvation Front (FIS) against the ruling secular National Liberation Front (FLN). This coup forced Chadli Bendjedid to resign, and effectively started the Algerian Civil War with FIS supporters taking up arms against the government.

== Coup ==
The cessation of the electoral process and vote-counting was undertaken by an unofficial body called the "army conclave". The conclave secretly convened at the headquarters of the Land Forces command at Ain Naadja, an area in Algiers, bring together all generals and senior officers in the Algerian People's National Army (ANP). Around fifty people were at this meeting, including the Minister of Defense Khaled Nezzar, Army Chief of Staff Abdelmalek Guenaizia, director of the Department of Intelligence and Security (DRS) Mohamed "Toufik" Mediène, the Counter-Espionage Director, central directors of the Ministry of Defense, and the commanders of the six military regions. Land Forces commander Mohamed Lamari, Minister of the Interior Larbi Belkheir, Ministry of Defense director Mohammed Touati, National Gendarmerie commander Banabbès Gheziel, Department of Military Manufacturing director Hacen Aït Abdesslam, and general Ahmed Boustila were also known to have been present.

== Meeting ==
The army chiefs urged the meeting's participants to sign a letter demanding the resignation of President Chadli Bendjedid "who, through his policy of compromise with the Islamists, seeks to force the officers of the ANP into retirement." The Janvierists' justification of the coup was:

1. The Islamic Salvation Front seeks to seize power by force.
2. If the FIS came to power, it would not respect the constitution or the rule of law.
3. It's necessary to maintain order and restore state authority.
4. It's necessary to promote economic improvement and to fight against unemployment.

The army was supported in the coup by secular and pro-democratic political parties. The Janvierists gained legitimacy by proclaiming themselves saviors of Algeria "defending democracy" as guarantors of secularism against fundamentalism. The putschists dissolved the People's National Assembly and forced Bendjedid to resign on January 12. The Janvierists then arrested all top leaders of the FIS and dissolved the party. Mohamed Boudiaf was named the leader of the provisional High Council of State on January 14, inaugurating the civil war.

== See also ==
- Algerian Civil War
- 1992 Algerian coup d'état
