= History of Islamism =

Islamism a religio-political ideology that seeks to revive Islam to its past assertiveness and glory, purify it of foreign elements, reassert its role into "social and political as well as personal life" where "government and society are ordered in accordance with laws prescribed by Islam" (aka Sharia).

It is thought to have started to form towards the end of the 19th Century with Sayyid Rashid Rida, developed as an idea "more or less in 1940" (according to Olivier Roy), under Hassan al-Banna (founder of the Muslim Brotherhood), Sayyid Qutb, Abul A'la Maududi, and Ruhollah Khomeini; surprising the world with the overthrow of the Shah of Iran in 1979, and going on to "arguably" alter "the Middle East more than any trend since the modern states gained independence", redefining "politics and even borders" (according to author Robin Wright).

As of 2020, at least some observers have detected a decline in the vigor and popularity of the ideology, as well a backlash against Islamist rule in some countries (Turkey, Iran, and Sudan).

== Precursor events ==
=== Debate on revival of Caliphate ===
The abolition of the Ottoman Sultanate by the Grand National Assembly of Turkey on 1 November 1922 ended the Ottoman Empire, which had lasted since 1299. On 11 November 1922, at the Conference of Lausanne, the sovereignty of the Grand National Assembly exercised by the Government in Angora (now Ankara) over Turkey was recognized. The last sultan, Mehmed VI, departed the Ottoman capital, Constantinople (now Istanbul), on 17 November 1922. The legal position was solidified with the signing of the Treaty of Lausanne on 24 July 1923. In March 1924, the Caliphate was abolished, marking the end of Ottoman influence. This shocked the Sunni clerical world, and some felt the need to present Islam not as a traditional religion but as an innovative socio-political ideology of a modern nation-state. The success of the October Revolution, also known as the Bolshevik Revolution, in Russia led by the Bolshevik Party of Vladimir Lenin in 1917 was a source of inspiration. Though militantly atheist (and though they subjected Muslims under their control to "vigorous state-sponsored anti Islamic propaganda" (29)), Bolsheviks were the enemy of their enemy, branded themselves as the movement of the future that overturned the economic, political system of European colonialism. In British India, the Khilafat movement (1919–24) following World War I was led by Shaukat Ali, Maulana Mohammad Ali Jauhar, Hakim Ajmal Khan and Abul Kalam Azad as an expression of this desperation. The reaction to new realities of the modern world gave birth to Islamist ideologues like Rashid Rida and Abul A'la Maududi and organizations such as Muslim Brotherhood in Egypt and Majlis-e-Ahrar-ul-Islam in India. Rashid Rida was a prominent Salafi theologian of Egypt who called for the revival of Hadith studies in Sunni seminaries and a pioneering theoretician of Islamism in the modern age. During 1922–1923, Rida would publish a series of articles in Al-Manar titled “The Caliphate or the Supreme Imamate”. In this highly influential treatise, Rida advocates for the restoration of Caliphate ruled by muslim jurists and proposes gradualist measures of education, reformation and purification through the efforts of Salafiyya reform movements across the globe. Ayatullah Khomeini's book government of the jurist is greatly influenced by this book, so is his call to the pure Islam (Persian: اسلام ناب) and his analysis of the post-colonial Muslim world. Sayyid Rashid Rida, a student of Muhammad Abduh, had visited India in 1912 and was impressed by the Deoband and Nadwatul Ulama seminaries. These seminaries carried the legacy of Syed Ahmad Barelvi and his pre-modern Islamic emirate. Maududi was an Islamist ideologue and Hanafi Sunni scholar active in Hyderabad Deccan and later in Pakistan. Maududi was born to a clerical family and got his early education at home. At the age of eleven, he was admitted to a public school in Aurangabad. In 1919, he joined the Khilafat Movement and got closer to the scholars of Deoband. He commenced the dars-i nizami education under supervision of Deobandi seminary at the Fatihpuri mosque in Delhi. In 1925, he wrote a book on Jihad, al-Jihad fil-Islam(Arabic: الجهاد في الاسلام), that can be regarded as his first contribution to islamism. He was a prolific writer and wrote many books. His writings had a profound impact on Sayyid Qutb.

== Predecessor figures and movements ==
Some Islamic revivalist movements and leaders pre-dating Islamism include:

- Ahmad Sirhindi (~1564–1624) was part of a reassertion of orthodoxy within Islamic Mysticism (Taṣawwuf) and was known to his followers as the ' Mujaddid ('renovator) of the second millennium'. It has been said of Sirhindi that he 'gave to Indian Islam the rigid and conservative stamp it bears today.'
- Ibn Taymiyyah (1263-1328), a Syrian Islamic jurist during the 13th and 14th centuries who is often quoted by contemporary Islamists. Ibn Taymiyya argued against the shirking of Sharia law, was against practices such as the celebration of Muhammad's birthday, and "he believed that those who ask assistance from the grave of the Prophet or saints, are mushrikin (polytheists), someone who is engaged in shirk."
- Shah Waliullah (1703-1762) of India and Muhammad ibn Abd-al-Wahhab of Arabia were contemporaries who met each other while studying in Mecca. Shah Waliullah was a forerunner of reformist Islamists like Muhammad Abduh, Muhammad Iqbal and Muhammad Asad in his belief that there was "a constant need for new ijtihad as the Muslim community progressed and expanded and new generations had to cope with new problems" and his interest in the social and economic problems of the poor.
- Muhammad ibn Abd-al-Wahhab (1703-1792) advocated doing away with the later accretions like grave worship and getting back to the letter and the spirit of Islam as preached and practiced by Muhammad. He went on to found Wahhabism.

Revivalists who fought early in the colonial era included

- Sayyid Ahmad Barelvi (1856-1921) was a disciple and successor of Shah Waliullah's son who emphasized the 'purification' of Islam from un-Islamic beliefs and practices. He anticipated modern militant Islamists by leading an extremist, jihadist movement and attempted to create an Islamic state based on the enforcement of Islamic law. While he battled Sikh fundamentalist rule in Muslim-majority North-Western India, his followers fought against British colonialism after his death and allied themselves with the Indian Mutiny.
- After the failure of the Indian Mutiny, some of Shah Waliullah's followers turned to more peaceful methods for preserving India's Islamic heritage and founded the Dar al-Ulum seminary in 1867 in the town of Deoband. From the school developed the Deobandi movement which became the largest philosophical movement of traditional Islamic thought on the subcontinent and led to the establishment of thousands of madrasahs throughout modern-day India, Pakistan and Bangladesh.
- Shamil fought the Russians in Daghestan (1830-1859)(p. 39)
- Abdul-Qadir fought the French in Algeria (1833-1847)(p. 39)

== Early history ==
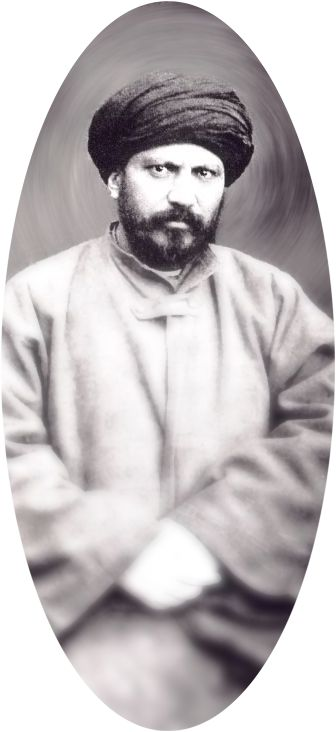
Jamal-al-Din al-Afghani

Though Islamists draw on work of early/medieval Islamic scholars (mentioned above), the roots of Islamist movements are found in the late 19th century when "the Islamic world grappled simultaneously with increased engagement with modernity and the ideas of Enlightenment, on the one hand, and with its own decline in the face of Western colonialism, on the other". Print technology and mass literacy expanded, facilitating the spread of new ideas as well as greater access to Islamic materials—particularly the Qurʾān. This "undermined the authority of trained religious scholars", (ʿulamāʾ), as interpretative gatekeepers, as lay believers used printed Quran's to engage "in their own individual interpretations of the scripture (ijtihād)", leading to "increased scriptural literalism". At the same time "modernist thinkers attempted to reconcile decay in the Islamic world (which had once been a leader in scientific achievement and intellectual endeavour) with the success of the West".

A particularly harsh demonstration of Islamic decline was the dismemberment of most of the Muslim Ottoman Empire by non-Muslim European colonial powers towards the end of the 19th century saw . The empire had spent massive sums on Western civilian and military technology to try to modernize and compete with the encroaching European powers, and in the process went deep into debt to these powers.

In this context, the publications of Jamal ad-din al-Afghani (1837–97), Muhammad Abduh (1849–1905) and Rashid Rida (1865–1935) preached Islamic alternatives to the political, economic, and cultural decline of the empire. Muhammad Abduh and Rashid Rida formed the beginning of the Islamist movement, as well as the reformist Islamist movement.

Their ideas included the creation of a truly Islamic society under sharia law, and the rejection of taqlid, the blind imitation of earlier authorities, which they believed deviated from the true messages of Islam. Unlike some later Islamists, Early Salafiyya strongly emphasized the restoration of the Caliphate.

=== Sayyid Rashid Rida ===
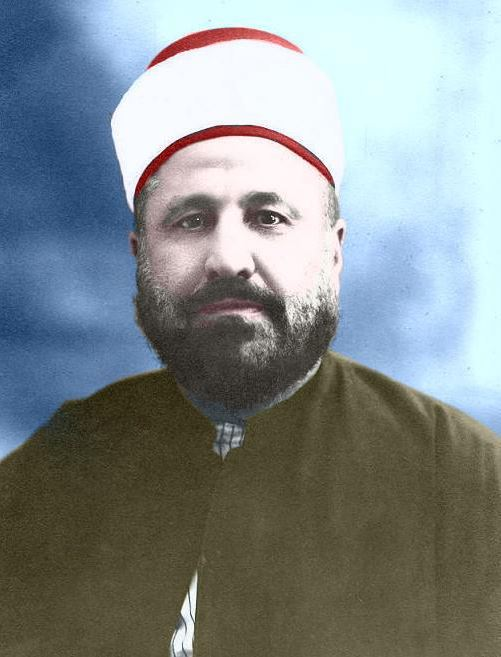
Sayyid Muhammad Rashid Rida (Arabic: سيد رشيد رضا; 23 September 1865 – 22 August 1935).

Syrian-Egyptian Islamic scholar Muhammad Rashid Rida first articulated the modern concept of an Islamic state that played a significant role in forming the revolutionary ideology of the early years of the Muslim Brotherhood, as well as influencing other Sunni Islamist movements.

In his influential book al-Khilafa aw al-Imama al-'Uzma ("The Caliphate or the Grand Imamate"); Rida explained that societies that properly obeyed Sharia would be successful alternatives to the disorder and injustice of both capitalism and socialism.

In Rida's Caliphate, the Khalifa would be the supreme head who would supervise the application of Islamic laws in a partnership with the Mujtahid ulema (juristic clergy). They would engage in Ijtihad by evaluating the Scriptures and govern through shura (consultation). With the Khilafa providing true Islamic governance, Islamic civilization would be revitalised, the political and legal independence of the Muslim umma (community of Muslim believers) would be restored, and the heretical influences of Sufism would be cleanse from Islam.

This doctrine would become the blueprint of future Islamist movements.

=== Muhammad Iqbal ===
Muhammad Iqbal was a philosopher, poet and politician in British India who is widely regarded as having inspired the Islamic Nationalism and Pakistan Movement in British India. Iqbal is admired as a prominent classical poet by Pakistani, Iranian, Indian and other international scholars of literature. Though Iqbal is best known as an eminent poet, he is also a highly acclaimed "Islamic philosophical thinker of modern times".

While studying law and philosophy in England and Germany, Iqbal became a member of the London branch of the All India Muslim League. He came back to Lahore in 1908. While dividing his time between law practice and philosophical poetry, Iqbal had remained active in the Muslim League. He did not support Indian involvement in World War I and remained in close touch with Muslim political leaders such as Muhammad Ali Johar and Muhammad Ali Jinnah. He was a critic of the mainstream Indian nationalist and secularist Indian National Congress. Iqbal's seven English lectures were published by Oxford University Press in 1934 in a book titled The Reconstruction of Religious Thought in Islam. These lectures dwell on the role of Islam as a religion as well as a political and legal philosophy in the modern age.

Iqbal expressed fears that not only would secularism and secular nationalism weaken the spiritual foundations of Islam and Muslim society, but that India's Hindu-majority population would crowd out Muslim heritage, culture and political influence. In his travels to Egypt, Afghanistan, Palestine and Syria, he promoted ideas of greater Islamic political co-operation and unity, calling for the shedding of nationalist differences. Sir Mummad Iqbal was elected president of the Muslim League in 1930 at its session in Allahabad as well as for the session in Lahore in 1932. In his Allahabad Address on 29 December 1930, Iqbal outlined a vision of an independent state for Muslim-majority provinces in northwestern India. This address later inspired the Pakistan movement.

The thoughts and vision of Iqbal later influenced many reformist Islamists, e.g., Muhammad Asad, Sayyid Abul Ala Maududi and Ali Shariati.

=== Sayyid Abul Ala Maududi ===
Sayyid Abul Ala Maududi was an important early twentieth-century figure in the Islamic revival in India, and then after independence from Britain, in Pakistan. Trained as a lawyer he chose the profession of journalism, and wrote about contemporary issues and most importantly about Islam and Islamic law. Maududi founded the Jamaat-e-Islami party in 1941 and remained its leader until 1972. However, Maududi had much more impact through his writing than through his political organising. His extremely influential books (translated into many languages) placed Islam in a modern context, and influenced not only conservative ulema but liberal modernizer Islamists such as al-Faruqi, whose "Islamization of Knowledge" carried forward some of Maududi's key principles.

Maududi believed that Islam was all-encompassing: "Everything in the universe is 'Muslim' for it obeys God by submission to His laws... The man who denies God is called Kafir (concealer) because he conceals by his disbelief what is inherent in his nature and embalmed in his own soul."

Maududi also believed that Muslim society could not be Islamic without Sharia, and Islam required the establishment of an Islamic state. This state should be a "theo-democracy," based on the principles of: tawhid (unity of God), risala (prophethood) and khilafa (caliphate). Although Maududi talked about Islamic revolution, by "revolution" he meant not a violent rupture with the status quo or violence or populist policies of the Iranian Revolution, but the gradual changing the hearts and minds of individuals from the top of society downward through an educational process or da'wah that would be "revolutionary" in its effects.

=== Muslim Brotherhood ===
Roughly contemporaneous with Maududi was the founding of the Muslim Brotherhood in Ismailiyah, Egypt in 1928 by Hassan al Banna. His was arguably the first, largest and most influential modern Islamic political/religious organization. Under the motto "the Qur'an is our constitution," it sought Islamic revival through preaching and also by providing basic community services including schools, mosques, and workshops. Like Maududi, Al Banna believed in the necessity of government rule based on Shariah law implemented gradually and by persuasion, and of eliminating all imperialist influence in the Muslim world.

Some elements of the Brotherhood, though perhaps against orders, did engage in violence against the government, and its founder Al-Banna was assassinated in 1949 in retaliation for the assassination of Egypt's premier Mahmud Fami Naqrashi three months earlier. The Brotherhood has suffered periodic repression in Egypt and has been banned several times, in 1948 and several years later following confrontations with Egyptian president Gamal Abdul Nasser, who jailed thousands of members for several years.

Despite periodic repression, the Brotherhood has become one of the most influential movements in the Islamic world, particularly in the Arab world. For many years it was described as "semi-legal" and was the only opposition group in Egypt able to field candidates during elections. In the Egyptian parliamentary election, 2011–2012, the political parties identified as "Islamist" (the Brotherhood's Freedom and Justice Party, Salafi Al-Nour Party and liberal Islamist Al-Wasat Party) won 75% of the total seats. Mohamed Morsi, an Islamist of Muslim Brotherhood, was the first democratically elected president of Egypt. He was deposed during the 2013 Egyptian coup d'état.

=== Sayyid Qutb ===
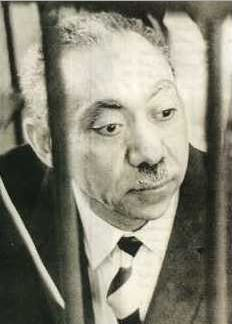
Sayyid Qutb

Maududi's political ideas influenced Sayyid Qutb a leading member of the Muslim Brotherhood movement, and one of the key philosophers of Islamism and highly influential thinkers of Islamic universalism. Qutb believed things had reached such a state that the Muslim community had literally ceased to exist. It "has been extinct for a few centuries," having reverted to Godless ignorance (Jahiliyya).

To eliminate jahiliyya, Qutb argued Sharia, or Islamic law, must be established. Sharia law was not only accessible to humans and essential to the existence of Islam, but also all-encompassing, precluding "evil and corrupt" non-Islamic ideologies like communism, nationalism, or secular democracy.

Qutb preached that Muslims must engage in a two-pronged attack of converting individuals through preaching Islam peacefully and also waging what he called militant jihad so as to forcibly eliminate the "power structures" of Jahiliyya—not only from the Islamic homeland but from the face of the earth.

Qutb was both a member of the brotherhood and enormously influential in the Muslim world at large. Qutb is considered by some (Fawaz A. Gerges) to be "the founding father and leading theoretician" of modern jihadists, such as Osama bin Laden. However, the Muslim Brotherhood in Egypt and in Europe has not embraced his vision of undemocratic Islamic state and armed jihad, something for which they have been denounced by radical Islamists.

== International impact ==
=== Attempted use against Communists/leftists ===
In the 1950s, 1960s, and most of the 1970s, Western countries sometimes attempted to take advantage of Islamic revival fervour to use it as a weapon against lefist adversaries, based on the assumption that whatever differences they had with pious Muslims, leftists and especially the Marxist-Leninist movement was a stronger and more dangerous adversary. This was particularly the case during the Cold War against the Soviet Union and Soviet Bloc states because part of the Communist ideology was atheism. It was later understood that the hatred Islamists felt for the West was just as intense as their hatred for atheist Marxists and led to "blowback", but in the meantime the practice often strengthened theIslamist movements involved.

In a September 1957 White House meeting between U.S. President Eisenhower and senior U.S. foreign policy officials, it was agreed to use the communists' lack of religion against them by setting up a secret task force to deliver weapons to Middle East states, including the Saudi Arabia. "We should do everything possible to stress the 'holy war' aspect" that has currency in the Middle East, President Eisenhower stated in agreement.

During the 1970s and sometimes later, this aid sometimes went to fledgling Islamists and Islamist groups . The US spent billions of dollars to aid the mujahideen Muslim Afghanistan enemies of the Soviet Union, and non-Afghan veterans of the war returned home with their prestige, "experience, ideology, and weapons", and had considerable impact. The 9/11 attacks led by the Arab Afghan hero Osama bin Laden, are thought to be the "blowback" of that operation.

Although it is a strong opponent of Israel's existence, Hamas, officially created in 1987, traces back its origins to institutions and clerics supported by Israel in the 1970s and 1980s. Israel tolerated and supported Islamist movements in Gaza, with figures like Ahmed Yassin, as Israel perceived them preferable to the secular and then more powerful al-Fatah with the PLO.

Egyptian President Anwar Sadat – whose policies included opening Egypt to Western investment (infitah); transferring Egypt's allegiance from the Soviet Union to the United States; and making peace with Israel—released Islamists from prison and welcomed home exiles in tacit exchange for political support in his struggle against leftists. His "encouraging of the emergence of the Islamist movement" was said to have been "imitated by many other Muslim leaders in the years that followed." This "gentlemen's agreement" between Sadat and Islamists broke down in 1975 but not before Islamists came to completely dominate university student unions. Sadat was later assassinated and a formidable insurgency was formed in Egypt in the 1990s. The French government has also been reported to have promoted Islamist preachers "in the hope of channeling Muslim energies into zones of piety and charity."

=== Six-Day War (1967) ===
The quick and decisive defeat of troops from several Arab countries (Egypt, Jordan, Syria, Iraq and Saudi Arabia) by the small non-Muslim country of Israeli during the Six-Day War constituted a pivotal event in the Arab Muslim world. The defeat along with economic stagnation in the defeated countries, was blamed on the secular Arab nationalism of the ruling regimes. A steep and steady decline in the popularity and credibility of secular, socialist and nationalist politics ensued. Ba'athism, Arab socialism, and Arab nationalism suffered, and different democratic and anti-democratic Islamist movements inspired by Maududi and Sayyid Qutb gained ground.

=== Iranian Revolution (1978–1979) ===
The first modern "Islamist state" (with the possible exception of Zia's Pakistan) was established among the Shia of Iran. In a major shock to the rest of the world, Ayatollah Ruhollah Khomeini (a religious elderly cleric who had lived in exile for more than a decade) led the Iranian Revolution of 1979 in order to overthrow the oil-rich, well-armed, Westernized and pro-American secular monarchy ruled by Shah Muhammad Reza Pahlavi. "Few expected the regime of the Shah, which had international support and a modern army of 400,000, to crumble in the face of unarmed demonstrators within a matter of months."

Khomeini believed that complete imitation of the Prophet Mohammad and his successors such as Ali for the restoration of Sharia law was essential to Islam, that secular, Westernizing Muslims were not misguided, but "agents" of the West serving Western interests, helping to "plunder" Muslim lands as part of a long-term conspiracy against Islam by Western governments. It is the duty of Muslims to "destroy" "all traces" of any other sort of government other than true Islamic governance because these are "systems of unbelief". "Troublesome" groups that cause "corruption in Muslim society," and damage "Islam and the Islamic state" will be eliminated just as The Prophet eliminated the Jews of Bani Qurayza.

Khomeini and his followers helped translate the works of Mawdudi and Qutb into Persian and were influenced by them, but their views differed from them and other Sunni scholars in that:

- As a Shia, Khomeini looked to Ali ibn Abī Tālib and Husayn ibn Ali Imam, but not Caliphs Abu Bakr, Omar or Uthman.
- Khomeini talked not about restoring the Caliphate or Sunni Islamic democracy, but about establishing a state where the guardianship of the democratic or the dictatorial political system was performed by Shia jurists (ulama) as the successors of Shia Imams until the Mahdi returns from occultation. His concept of velayat-e-faqih ("guardianship of the [Islamic] jurist"), held that the leading Shia Muslim cleric in society—which Khomeini's mass of followers believed and chose to be himself—should serve as the supervisor of the state in order to protect or "guard" Islam and Sharia law from "innovation" and "anti-Islamic laws" passed by dictators or democratic parliaments.

The revolution was influenced by Marxism through Islamist thought and also by writings that sought either to counter Marxism (Muhammad Baqir al-Sadr's work) or to integrate socialism and Islamism (Ali Shariati's work). A strong wing of the revolutionary leadership was made up of leftists or "radical populists", such as Ali Akbar Mohtashami-Pur.

Support for the Iranian revolution in the Muslim world has waxed and waned. Initially enthusiasm was intense, but weakened as "purges, executions, and atrocities tarnished its image". During the 2006 Israel-Lebanon conflict, the Iranian government enjoyed something of a resurgence in popularity amongst the predominantly Sunni "Arab street," due to its support for Hezbollah and to President Mahmoud Ahmadinejad's vehement opposition to the United States and his call that Israel shall vanish. As of 2022-3, continuing widespread domestic unrest and protest has again lowered its image.

The Islamic Republic has also maintained its hold on power in Iran in spite of US economic sanctions, and has created or assisted like-minded Shia terrorist groups in Iraq, Egypt, Syria, Jordan (SCIRI) and Lebanon (Hezbollah) (two Muslim countries that also have large Shiite populations).

=== Grand Mosque seizure (1979) ===
The strength of the Islamist movement was manifest in an event which might have seemed sure to turn Muslim public opinion against fundamentalism, but did just the opposite. In 1979 the Grand Mosque in Mecca Saudi Arabia was seized by an armed fundamentalist group and held for over a week. Scores were killed, including many pilgrim bystanders in a gross violation of one of the most holy sites in Islam (and one where arms and violence are strictly forbidden).

Instead of prompting a backlash against the movement from which the attackers originated, however, Saudi Arabia, already very conservative, responded by shoring up its fundamentalist credentials with even more Islamic restrictions. Crackdowns followed on everything from shopkeepers who did not close for prayer and newspapers that published pictures of women, to the selling of dolls, teddy bears (images of animate objects are considered haraam), and dog food (dogs are considered unclean).

In other Muslim countries, blame for and wrath against the seizure was directed not against fundamentalists, but against Islamic fundamentalism's foremost geopolitical enemy—the United States. Ayatollah Khomeini sparked attacks on American embassies when he announced:

It is not beyond guessing that this is the work of criminal American imperialism and international Zionism

despite the fact that the object of the fundamentalists' revolt was the Kingdom of Saudi Arabia, America's major ally in the region. Anti-American demonstrations followed in the Philippines, Turkey, Bangladesh, India, the UAE, Pakistan, and Kuwait. The US Embassy in Libya was burned by protesters chanting pro-Khomeini slogans and the embassy in Islamabad, Pakistan was burned to the ground.

=== Soviet invasion of Afghanistan (1979–1989) ===
In 1979, the Soviet Union deployed its 40th Army into Afghanistan, attempting to suppress an Islamic rebellion against an allied Marxist regime in the Afghan Civil War. The conflict, pitting indigenous impoverished Muslims (mujahideen) against an anti-religious superpower, galvanized thousands of Muslims around the world to send aid and sometimes to go themselves to fight for their faith. Leading this pan-Islamic effort was Palestinian sheikh Abdullah Yusuf Azzam. While the military effectiveness of these "Afghan Arabs" was marginal, an estimated 16,000 to 35,000 Muslim volunteers came from around the world to fight in Afghanistan.

When the Soviet Union abandoned the Marxist Najibullah regime and withdrew from Afghanistan in 1989 (the regime finally fell in 1992), the victory was seen by many Muslims as the triumph of Islamic faith over superior military power and technology that could be duplicated elsewhere.

The jihadists gained legitimacy and prestige from their triumph both within the militant community and among ordinary Muslims, as well as the confidence to carry their jihad to other countries where they believed Muslims required assistance.|

The "veterans of the guerrilla campaign" returning home to Algeria, Egypt, and other countries "with their experience, ideology, and weapons," were often eager to continue armed jihad.

The collapse of the Soviet Union itself, in 1991, was seen by many Islamists, including Bin Laden, as the defeat of a superpower at the hands of Islam. Concerning the $6 billion in aid given by the US and Pakistan's military training and intelligence support to the mujahideen, bin Laden wrote: "[T]he US has no mentionable role" in "the collapse of the Soviet Union ... rather the credit goes to God and the mujahidin" of Afghanistan.

=== Persian Gulf War (1990–1991) ===
Another factor in the early 1990s that worked to radicalize the Islamist movement was the Gulf War, which brought several hundred thousand US and allied non-Muslim military personnel to Saudi Arabian soil to put an end to Saddam Hussein's occupation of Kuwait. Prior to 1990 Saudi Arabia played an important role in restraining the many Islamist groups that received its aid. But when Saddam, secularist and Ba'athist dictator of neighboring Iraq, attacked Kuwait (his enemy in the war), western troops came to protect the Saudi monarchy. Islamists accused the Saudi regime of being a puppet of the west.

These attacks resonated with conservative Muslims and the problem did not go away with Saddam's defeat either, since American troops remained stationed in the kingdom, and a de facto cooperation with the Palestinian-Israeli peace process developed. Saudi Arabia attempted to compensate for its loss of prestige among these groups by repressing those domestic Islamists who attacked it (bin Laden being a prime example), and increasing aid to Islamic groups (Islamist madrassas around the world and even aiding some violent Islamist groups) that did not, but its pre-war influence on behalf of moderation was greatly reduced. One result of this was a campaign of attacks on government officials and tourists in Egypt, a bloody civil war in Algeria and Osama bin Laden's terror attacks climaxing in the 9/11 attack.

=== 2000s ===
By the beginning of the twenty first century, "the word secular, a label proudly worn" in the 1960s and 70s was "shunned" and "used to besmirch" political foes in Egypt and the rest of the Muslim world. Islamists surpassed the small secular opposition parties in terms of "doggedness, courage," "risk-taking" or "organizational skills".

In the Middle East and Pakistan, religious discourse dominates societies, the airwaves, and thinking about the world. Radical mosques have proliferated throughout Egypt. Book stores are dominated by works with religious themes ... The demand for sharia, the belief that their governments are unfaithful to Islam and that Islam is the answer to all problems, and the certainty that the West has declared war on Islam; these are the themes that dominate public discussion. Islamists may not control parliaments or government palaces, but they have occupied the popular imagination.

Opinion polls in a variety of Islamic countries showed that significant majorities opposed groups like ISIS, but also wanted religion to play a greater role in public life.

==== Hizb ut-Tahrir ====
Hizb ut-Tahrir is an influential international Islamist movement, founded in 1953 by an Islamic Qadi (judge) Taqiuddin al-Nabhani. HT is unique from most other Islamist movements in that the party focuses not on implementation of Sharia on local level or on providing social services, but on unifying the Muslim world under its vision of a new Islamic caliphate spanning from North Africa and the Middle East to much of central and South Asia.

To this end it has drawn up and published a 186-article constitution for its proposed caliphate-state specifying specific policies such as sharia law, a "unitary ruling system" headed by a caliph elected by Muslims, an economy based on the gold standard, public ownership of utilities, public transport, and energy resources, death for apostates and Arabic as the "sole language of the State."

In its focus on the Caliphate, the party takes a different view of Muslim history than some other Islamists such as Muhammad Qutb. HT sees Islam's pivotal turning point as occurring not with the death of Ali, or one of the other four "rightly guided" caliphs in the 7th century, but with the abolition of the Ottoman Caliphate in 1924. This is believed to have ended the true Islamic system, something for which it blames "the disbelieving (Kafir) colonial powers" working through Turkish modernist Mustafa Kemal Atatürk.

HT does not engage in armed jihad or work for a democratic system, but works to take power through "ideological struggle" to change Muslim public opinion, and in particular through elites who will "facilitate" a "change of the government," i.e., launch a "bloodless" coup. It allegedly attempted and failed such coups in 1968 and 1969 in Jordan, and in 1974 in Egypt, and is now banned in both countries.

The party is sometimes described as "Leninist" and "rigidly controlled by its central leadership," with its estimated one million members required to spend "at least two years studying party literature under the guidance of mentors (Murshid)" before taking "the party oath." HT is particularly active in the ex-soviet republics of Central Asia and in Europe.

==== Post-Arab Spring (2011–present) ====
One observer (Quinn Mecham) notes four trends in Islamism rising from the Arab Spring of 2010–11:

- The repression of the Muslim Brotherhood. Primarily by the Egyptian military and courts following the forcible removal of Morsi from office in 2013; but also by Saudi Arabia and a number of Gulf countries (not Qatar).
- Rise of Islamist "state-building" where "state failure" has taken place—most prominently in Syria, Iraq, Libya and Yemen. Islamists have found it easier than competing non-Islamists trying to fill the void of state failure, by securing external funding, weaponry and fighters—"many of which have come from abroad and have rallied around a pan-Islamic identity". The norms of governance in these Islamist areas are militia-based, and the population submit to their authority out of fear, loyalty, other reasons, or some combination. The "most expansive" of these new "models" is the Islamic State.
- Increasing sectarianism at least in part from Proxy Wars. Fighters are proxies primarily for Saudi Arabia and the Gulf states and for Iran. Islamists are fighting Islamists across sectarian lines in Lebanon (Sunni militants targeting Hezbollah positions), Yemen (between mainstream Sunni Islamists of Islah and the Shiite Zaydi Houthi movement), in Iraq (Islamic State and Iraqi Shiite militias)
- Increased caution and political learning in countries such as Algeria and Jordan where Islamist have chosen not to lead a major challenge against their governments. In Yemen Islah "has sought to frame its ideology in a way that will avoid charges of militancy".

Another observer (Tarek Osman) notes with concern that

- the failure to take power during the Arab Spring has led not to "soul-searching" in major Islamist groups about what went wrong, but instead to "antagonism and fiery anger" and a thirst for revenge. Partisans of political Islam (although this does not include some prominent leaders such as Rached Ghannouchi but is particularly true in Egypt) see themselves as victims of an injustice whose perpetrators are not just "individual conspirators but entire social groups".

==== Islamic State of Iraq and the Levant ====
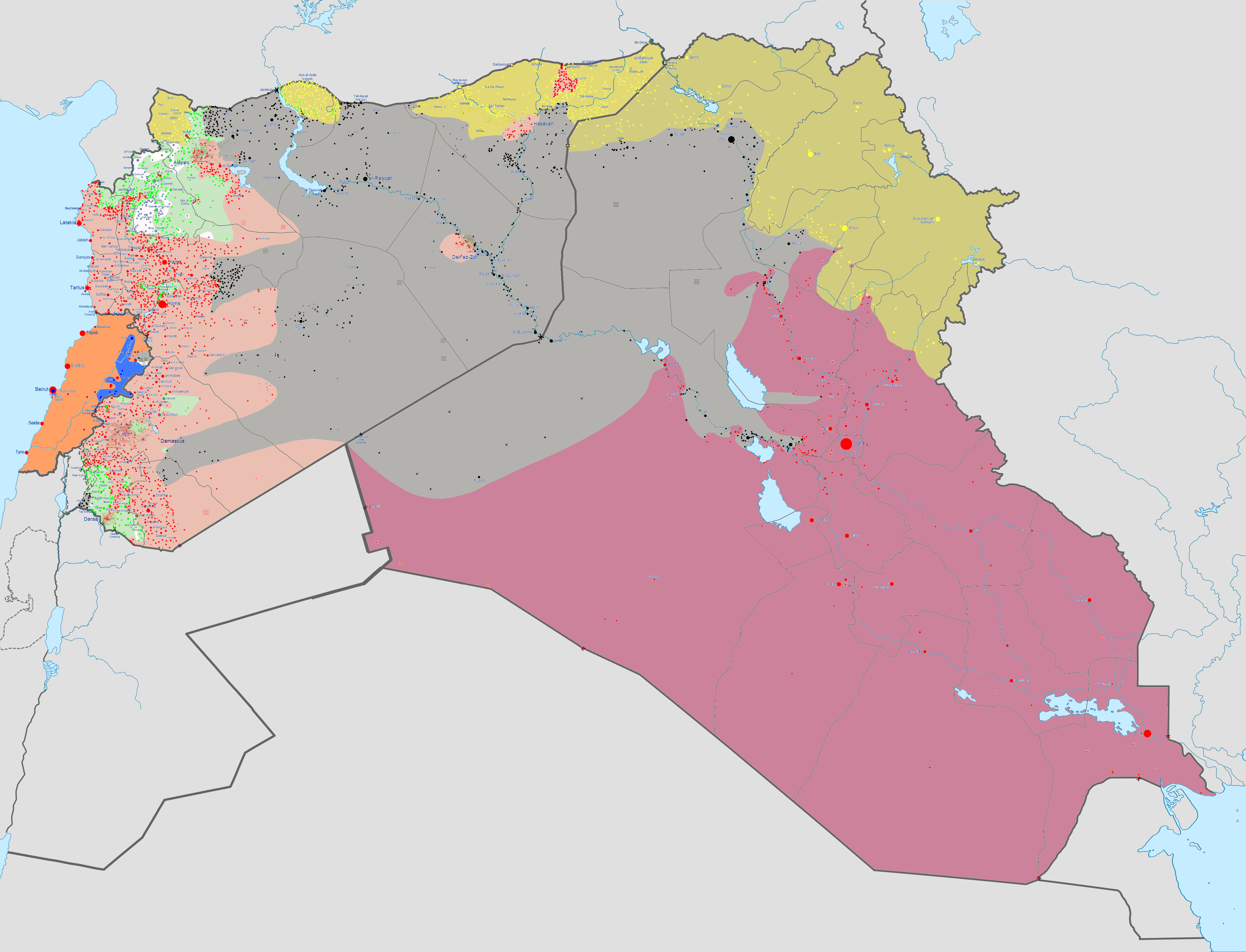
ISIL's territory, in grey, at the time of its greatest territorial extent in May 2015

"The Islamic State", formerly known as the "Islamic State of Iraq and the Levant" and before that as the "Islamic State of Iraq", (also called by the Arabic acronym Daesh), is a Wahhabi/Salafi jihadist extremist militant group which is led by and mainly composed of Sunni Arabs from Syria and Iraq. In 2014, the group proclaimed itself a caliphate, with religious, political and military authority over all Muslims worldwide. As of March 2015, it had control over territory occupied by ten million people in Syria and Iraq, and has nominal control over small areas of Libya, Nigeria, and Afghanistan. (While a self-described state, it lacks international recognition.) ISIL also operates or has affiliates in other parts of the world, including North Africa and South Asia

Originating as the Jama'at al-Tawhid wal-Jihad in 1999, ISIL pledged allegiance to al-Qaeda in 2004, participated in the Iraqi insurgency that followed the invasion of Iraq by Western coalition forces in 2003, joined the fight in the Syrian Civil War beginning in 2011, and was expelled from al-Qaeda in early 2014, (which complained of its failure to consult and "notorious intransigence"). ISIL gained prominence after it drove Iraqi government forces out of key cities in western Iraq in an offensive in June that same year. The group is adept at social media, posting Internet videos of beheadings of soldiers, civilians, journalists and aid workers, and is known for its destruction of cultural heritage sites. The United Nations (UN) has held ISIL responsible for human rights abuses and war crimes, and Amnesty International has reported ethnic cleansing by the group on a "historic scale". The group has been designated a terrorist organisation by the UN, the European Union (EU) and member states, the United States, India, Indonesia, Turkey, Saudi Arabia, Syria and other countries.

=== Decline ===
By 2020, approximately 40 years after the Islamic overthrow of the Shah of Iran and the seizure of the Grand Mosque by extremists, a number of observers (Olivier Roy, Mustafa Akyol, Nader Hashemi) detected a decline in the vigor and popularity of Islamism. Islamism had been an idealized/utopian concept to compare with the grim reality of the status quo, but in more than four decades it had failed to establish a "concrete and viable blueprint for society" despite repeated efforts (Olivier Roy); and instead had left a less than inspiring track record of its impact on the world (Nader Hashemi). Consequently, in addition to the trend towards moderation by Islamist or formerly Islamist parties (such as PKS of Indonesia, AKP of Turkey, and PAS of Malaysia) mentioned above, there has been a social/religious and sometimes political backlash against Islamist rule in countries like Turkey, Iran, and Sudan (Mustafa Akyol).

Writing in 2020, Mustafa Akyol argues there has been a strong reaction by many Muslims against political Islam, including a weakening of religious faith—the very thing Islamism was intended to strengthen. He suggests this backlash against Islamism among Muslim youth has come from all the "terrible things" that have happened in the Arab world in the twenty first century "in the name of Islam"—such as the "sectarian civil wars in Syria, Iraq and Yemen".

Polls taken by Arab Barometer in six Arab countries — Algeria, Egypt, Tunisia, Jordan, Iraq and Libya — found "Arabs are losing faith in religious parties and leaders." In 2018–19, in all six countries, fewer than 20% of those asked whether they trusted Islamist parties answered in the affirmative. That percentage had fallen (in all six countries) from when the same question was asked in 2012–14. Mosque attendance also declined more than 10 points on average, and the share of those Arabs describing themselves as "not religious" went from 8% in 2013 to 13% in 2018–19. In Syria, Sham al-Ali reports "Rising apostasy among Syrian youths".

Writing in 2021, Nader Hashemi notes that in Iraq, Sudan, Tunisia, Egypt, Gaza, Jordan and other places were Islamist parties have come to power or campaigned to, "one general theme stands. The popular prestige of political Islam has been tarnished by its experience with state power." Even Islamist terrorism was in decline and tended "to be local" rather than pan-Islamic. As of 2021, Al-Qaeda consisted of "a bunch of militias" with no effective central command (Fareed Zakaria).

== Rise of Islamism by country ==
=== Afghanistan (Taliban) ===
Flag of the Taliban

In Afghanistan, the mujahideen's victory against the Soviet Union in the 1980s did not lead to justice and prosperity, due to a vicious and destructive civil war between political and tribal warlords, making Afghanistan one of the poorest countries on earth. In 1992, the Democratic Republic of Afghanistan ruled by communist forces collapsed, and democratic Islamist elements of mujahideen founded the Islamic State of Afghanistan. In 1996, a more conservative and anti-democratic Islamist movement known as the Taliban rose to power, defeated most of the warlords and took over roughly 90% of Afghanistan.

The Taliban were spawned by the thousands of madrasahs the Deobandi movement established for impoverished Afghan refugees and supported by governmental and religious groups in neighboring Pakistan. The Taliban differed from other Islamist movements to the point where they might be more properly described as Islamic fundamentalist or neofundamentalist, interested in spreading "an idealized and systematized version of conservative tribal village customs" under the label of Sharia to an entire country. Their ideology was also described as being influenced by Wahhabism, and the extremist jihadism of their guest Osama bin Laden.

The Taliban considered "politics" to be against Sharia and thus did not hold elections. They were led by Abdul Ghani Baradar and Mohammed Omar who was given the title "Amir al-Mu'minin" or Commander of the Faithful, and a pledge of loyalty by several hundred Taliban-selected Pashtun clergy in April 1996. Taliban were overwhelmingly Pashtun and were accused of not sharing power with the approximately 60% of Afghans who belonged to other ethnic groups. (see: Taliban#Ideology and aims)

The Taliban's hosting of Osama bin Laden led to an American-organized attack which drove them from power following the 9/11 attacks. The Taliban continued to fight a vigorous insurgency with suicide bombings and armed attacks being launched against NATO and Afghan government targets. The Taliban re-established control of the country in 2021 following a 2020 peace agreement with the United States and the overthrow of the US-backed government.

=== Algeria ===
In 1989, a broad Islamist coalition movement was founded in Algeria known as the FIS or Front Islamique de Salut (the Islamic Salvation Front). Led by Abbassi Madani, and a charismatic Islamist young preacher, Ali Belhadj, it was influenced by Salafism and the jihad in Afghanistan, as well as the Muslim Brotherhood. Taking advantage of economic failure and unpopular social liberalization and secularization of the ruling leftist-nationalist FLN government, it used its preaching to advocate the establishment of a legal system following Sharia law, economic liberalization and development program, education in Arabic rather than French, and gender segregation, with women staying home to alleviate the high rate of unemployment among young Algerian men. The FIS won sweeping victories in local elections and was set to win national elections in 1991, when voting was canceled by a military coup d'état.

As Islamists took up arms to overthrow the government, the FIS's leaders were arrested and it became overshadowed by Islamist guerrilla groups, particularly the Islamic Salvation Army, MIA and Armed Islamic Group (or GIA). A bloody and devastating civil war ensued in which between 150,000 and 200,000 people were killed over the next decade.

The civil war was not a victory for Islamists. By 2002 the main guerrilla groups had either been destroyed or had surrendered. The popularity of Islamist parties has declined to the point that "the Islamist candidate, Abdallah Jaballah, came a distant third with 5% of the vote" in the 2004 presidential election.

=== Bangladesh ===
Jamaat-e-Islami Bangladesh is the largest Islamist party in the country and supports the implementation of Sharia law and promotes the country's main right-wing politics. Since 2000, the main political opposition Bangladesh Nationalist Party (BNP) has been allied with it and another Islamic party, Islami Oikya Jote. Some of their leaders and supporters, including former ministers and MPs, have been hanged for alleged war crimes during Bangladesh's struggle for independence and speaking against the ruling Bangladesh Awami League.

=== Belgium ===
In the 2012, the party named Islam had four candidates and they were elected in Molenbeek and Anderlecht. In 2018, they ran candidates in 28 municipalities. Its policies include schools must offer halal food and women must be able to wear a headscarf anywhere. Another of the Islam Party's goals is to separate men and women on public transportation. The party's president argues this policy will help protect women from sexual harassment.

=== Denmark ===
The Islamist movements gradually grew since the 1990s. The first Islamist groups and networks were predominantly influenced by the countries they immigrated from. Those involved had close contact with militant Islamists in the Middle East, South Asia and North Africa. Their operations had supporting militant groups financially as their first priority. Since the 1990s, people from the Islamist movements joined several conflicts to train with or participate in fighting with Islamist militants.

In the 2000s the Islamist movements grew and by 2014 there were militants among the Islamist movements in Copenhagen, Aarhus and Odense. Several people from crime gangs join Islamist movements that sympathise with militant Islamism. The militant Islamist movement were estimated to encompass some hundreds in 2014.

The Danish National Centre for Social Research released a report commissioned by the Ministry of Children, Integration and Social Affairs documenting 15 extremist groups operating in Denmark. Most were non-Muslim far-right or far-left groups, but five were Sunni Islamist groups. These Sunni Islamist groups include Hizb ut-Tahrir Denmark, Dawah-bærere (Dawah Carriers), Kaldet til Islam (The Call to Islam), Dawah-centret (The Dawah Centre), and the Muslimsk Ungdomscenter (The Muslim Youth Centre). All of these Sunni Islamist groups operate in Greater Copenhagen with the exception of Muslimsk Ungdomscenter, which operates in Aarhus. Altogether, roughly 195 to 415 Muslims belong to one of these organizations and most are young men.

=== Egypt (Jihadism) ===
While Qutb's ideas became increasingly radical during his imprisonment prior to his execution in 1966, the leadership of the Brotherhood, led by Hasan al-Hudaybi, remained moderate and interested in political negotiation and activism. Fringe or splinter movements inspired by the final writings of Qutb in the mid-1960s (particularly the manifesto Milestones, a.k.a. Ma'alim fi-l-Tariq) did, however, develop and they pursued a more radical direction. By the 1970s, the Brotherhood had renounced violence as a means of achieving its goals.

The path of violence and military struggle was then taken up by the Egyptian Islamic Jihad organization responsible for the assassination of Anwar Sadat in 1981. Unlike earlier anti-colonial movements the extremist group directed its attacks against what it believed were "apostate" leaders of Muslim states, leaders who held secular leanings or who had introduced or promoted Western/foreign ideas and practices into Islamic societies. Its views were outlined in a pamphlet written by Muhammad Abd al-Salaam Farag, in which he states:

...there is no doubt that the first battlefield for jihad is the extermination of these infidel leaders and to replace them by a complete Islamic Order...

Another of the Egyptian groups which employed violence in their struggle for Islamic order was al-Gama'a al-Islamiyya (Islamic Group). Victims of their campaign against the Egyptian state in the 1990s included the head of the counter-terrorism police (Major General Raouf Khayrat), a parliamentary speaker (Rifaat al-Mahgoub), dozens of European tourists and Egyptian bystanders, and over 100 Egyptian police. Ultimately the campaign to overthrow the government was unsuccessful, and the major jihadi group, Jamaa Islamiya (or al-Gama'a al-Islamiyya), renounced violence in 2003. Other lesser known groups include the Islamic Liberation Party, Salvation from Hell and Takfir wal-Hijra, and these groups have variously been involved in activities such as attempted assassinations of political figures, arson of video shops and attempted takeovers of government buildings.

=== Egypt (Muslim Brotherhood) ===
After the Egyptian Revolution of 2011 Mohamed Morsi of the Muslim Brotherhood won the 2012 presidential election. He was overthrown and the MB crushed in Egypt after the 2013 Egyptian coup d'état.

=== France ===
The Democratic Union of Muslims (French: Union des démocrates musulmans français, UDMF), a party founded in 2012, planned to take part in 2019 municipal elections. They presented candidate lists for 50 different cities. The UDMF also fielded candidates for European Parliament elections. The rise of the party can be attributed to French Muslim dissatisfaction with mainstream political parties.

Gérald Darmanin, Minister of the Interior of France, said in his book, Le séparatisme Islamiste, ‘Islamism, the most powerful ideology in the world, has deprived Islam of its voice.’

==== Law against Islamist extremism ====
After the murder of Paty, a bill was put forward to fight Islamist extremism and separatism to fight the roots of jihadist violence. It was approved by the National Assembly in February 2021.

A new bill was introduced, which makes it unlawful to threaten a public servant in order to gain an exception or special treatment which carries a penalty of up to five years in prison. The legislation expands the powers of authorities to close places of worship and religious organisations when they promote "hate or violence". The law requires religious funds from abroad exceeding €10,000 to be declared and the relevant accounts to be certified, so as to regulate the donations from countries such as Turkey, Qatar and Saudi Arabia. Millions of euros in funding had previously reached France from countries such as Turkey, Morocco and Saudi Arabia.

It provides stricter rules for allowing home-schooling in order to prevent parents taking children out of school in order to let them pursue their education in underground Islamist institutions. Doctors performing virginity tests would be subject to fines or prison sentences. These changes were prompted by a number of cases of Muslim men trying to have their marriages annulled by accusing their spouse of having had sex before marriage. Authorities will have to refuse residency documents to applicants who practise polygamy. Forced marriage, which The French ministry of the interior states affects 200,000 women in France, was likewise required to be combated with greater scrutiny from registrars.

==== Muslim Brotherhood in France ====
The brotherhood's build-up in France started with Union des organisations islamiques en France (UOIF) which later changed its name to Musulmans de France. The organization primarily consisted of foreign students who entered France from Tunisia and Morocco. By 2020, there were 147 mosques and 18 Islamic schools associated with the brotherhood. UOIF has about 50,000 members distributed among 200 member organizations.

The Brotherhood pursues a communitarianist philiosophy and works against Muslims adopting liberal lifestyles and becoming assimilated into French society. In the long term, they aim towards entering politics by increasing the number of Muslims until they can form a political party of their own.

In January 2026, the French National Assembly adopted a non-binding resolution calling on the European Union to assess whether the Muslim Brotherhood should be added to the EU's list of terrorist organisations. The resolution urged EU institutions to examine the movement's activities and networks in Europe, citing concerns about its ideological influence and alleged links to extremist currents. According to various sources, the vote reflected growing scrutiny in France of the Muslim Brotherhood's role in civil society and its perceived challenge to secular and republican values, while government officials emphasised that the measure did not amount to an immediate designation and that any EU-level decision would require a legal assessment and consensus among member states.

=== Gaza (Hamas) ===
The Hamas flag

Hamas is a Palestinian Sunni Islamist organization that governs the Gaza Strip where it has moved to establish sharia law in matters such as separation of the genders, using the lash for punishment, and Islamic dress code. Hamas also has a military resistance wing, the Izz ad-Din al-Qassam Brigades.

For some decades prior to the First Palestine Intifada in 1987, the Muslim Brotherhood in Palestine took a "quiescent" stance towards Israel, focusing on preaching, education and social services, and benefiting from Israel's "indulgence" to build up a network of mosques and charitable organizations. As the First Intifada gathered momentum and Palestinian shopkeepers closed their shops in support of the uprising, the Brotherhood announced the formation of HAMAS ("zeal"), devoted to Jihad against Israel. Rather than being more moderate than the PLO, the 1988 Hamas charter took a more uncompromising stand, calling for the destruction of Israel and the establishment of an Islamic state in Palestine. It was soon competing with and then overtaking the PLO for control of the intifada. The Brotherhood's base of devout middle class found common cause with the impoverished youth of the intifada in their cultural conservatism and antipathy for activities of the secular middle class such as drinking alcohol and going about without hijab.

Hamas has continued to play a significant role in the Israeli-Palestinian conflict. From 2000 to 2007 it killed 542 people in 140 suicide bombing or "martyrdom operations". In the January 2006 legislative election—its first foray into the political process—it won the majority of the seats, and in 2007 it drove the PLO out of Gaza. Hamas has been praised by Muslims for driving Israel out of the Gaza Strip, but criticized for failure to achieve its demands in the 2008–09 and 2014 Gaza Wars despite heavy destruction and significant loss of life.

=== Pakistan ===
Early in the history of the state of Pakistan (12 March 1949), a parliamentary resolution (the Objectives Resolution) was adopted in accordance with the vision of founding fathers of Pakistan (Muhammad Iqbal, Muhammad Ali Jinnah, Liaquat Ali Khan), proclaiming:

Sovereignty belongs to Allah alone but He has delegated it to the State of Pakistan through its people for being exercised within the limits prescribed by Him as a sacred trust.

- The State shall exercise its powers and authority through the elected representatives of the people.
- The principles of democracy, freedom, equality, tolerance and social justice, as enunciated by Islam, shall be fully observed.
- Muslims shall be enabled to order their lives in the individual and collective spheres in accordance with the teachings of Islam as set out in the Quran and Sunnah.
- Provision shall be made for the religious minorities to freely profess and practice their religions and develop their cultures.

This resolution later became a key source of inspiration for writers of the Constitution of Pakistan, and is included in the constitution as preamble.

In July 1977, General Zia-ul-Haq overthrew Prime Minister Zulfiqar Ali Bhutto's regime in Pakistan. Ali Bhutto, a leftist in democratic competition with Islamists, had announced banning alcohol and nightclubs within six months, shortly before he was overthrown. Zia-ul-Haq was much more committed to Islamism, and "Islamization" or implementation of Islamic law, became a cornerstone of his eleven-year military dictatorship and Islamism became his "official state ideology". Zia ul Haq was an admirer of Mawdudi and Mawdudi's party Jamaat-e-Islami became the "regime's ideological and political arm". In Pakistan this Islamization from above was "probably" more complete "than under any other regime except those in Iran and Sudan," but Zia-ul-Haq was also criticized by many Islamists for imposing "symbols" rather than substance, and using Islamization to legitimize his means of seizing power. Unlike neighboring Iran, Zia-ul-Haq's policies were intended to "avoid revolutionary excess", and not to strain relations with his American and Persian Gulf state allies. Zia-ul-Haq was killed in 1988 but Islamization remains an important element in Pakistani society.

=== Sudan ===
For many years, Sudan had an Islamist regime under the leadership of Hassan al-Turabi. His National Islamic Front first gained influence when strongman General Gaafar al-Nimeiry invited members to serve in his government in 1979. Turabi built a powerful economic base with money from foreign Islamist banking systems, especially those linked with Saudi Arabia. He also recruited and built a cadre of influential loyalists by placing sympathetic students in the university and military academy while serving as minister of education.

After al-Nimeiry was overthrown in 1985 the party did poorly in national elections, but in 1989 it was able to overthrow the elected post-al-Nimeiry government with the help of the military. Turabi was noted for proclaiming his support for the democratic process and a liberal government before coming to power, but strict application of sharia law, torture and mass imprisonment of the opposition, and an intensification of the long-running war in southern Sudan, once in power. The NIF regime also harbored Osama bin Laden for a time (before 9/11), and worked to unify Islamist opposition to the American attack on Iraq in the 1991 Gulf War.

After Sudanese intelligence services were implicated in an assassination attempt on the president of Egypt, UN economic sanctions were imposed on Sudan, a poor country, and Turabi fell from favor. He was imprisoned for a time in 2004–05. Some of the NIF policies, such as the war with the non-Muslim south, have been reversed, though the National Islamic Front still holds considerable power in the government of Omar al-Bashir and National Congress Party, another Islamist party in country.

=== Switzerland ===
Switzerland is not normally seen as a center of Islamism, especially when compared to countries such as Belgium or France. However, from 2012 to 2018, the majority of the country's jihadist and would-be jihadist population were radicalized in Switzerland.

=== Turkey ===
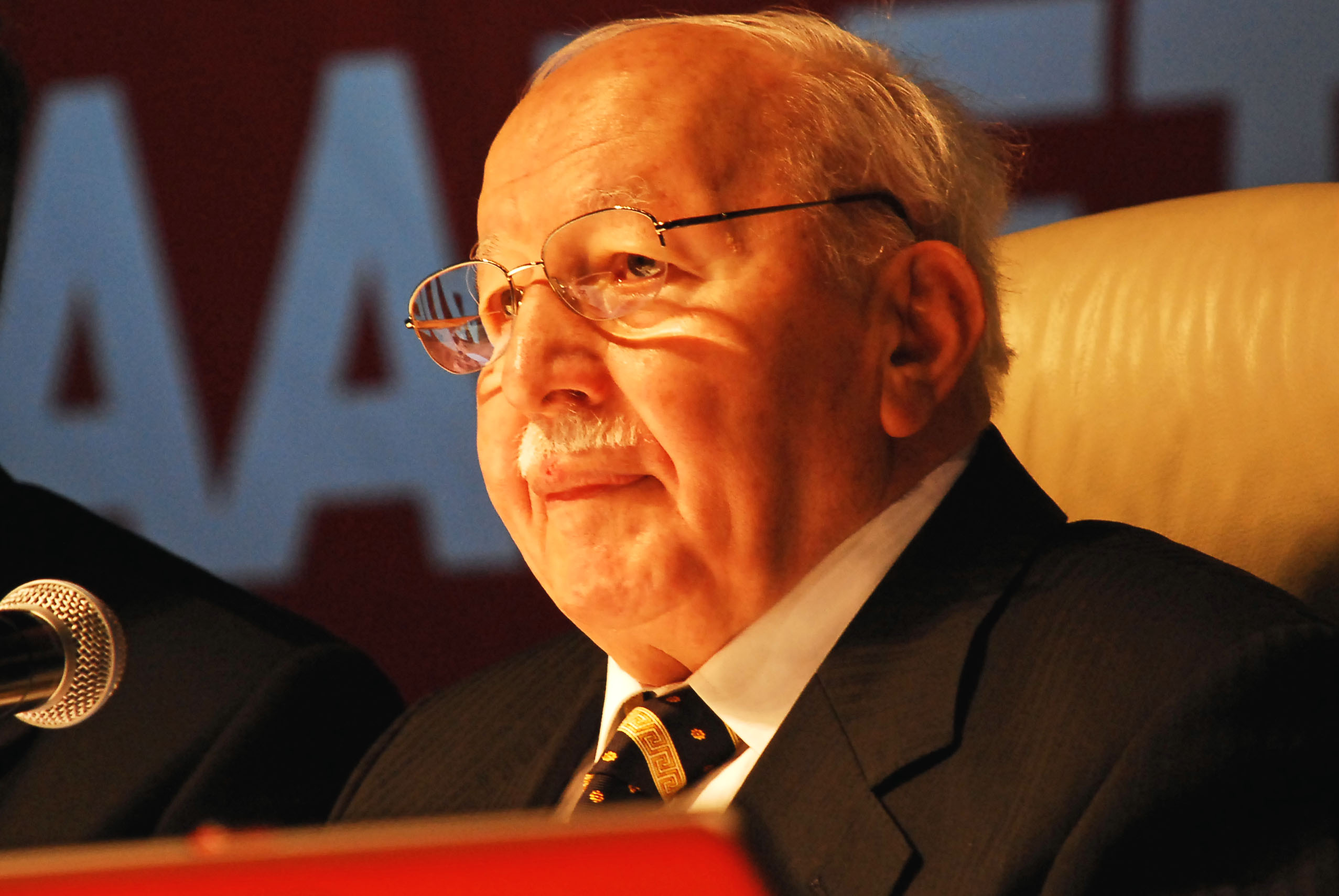
Necmettin Erbakan, elected in 1996, was the second Islamist Prime Minister of Turkey after Şemsettin Günaltay, but was removed from power by a "postmodern coup d'état" in 1997.

Turkey had a number of Islamist parties, often changing names as they were banned by the constitutional court for anti-secular activities. Necmettin Erbakan (1926–2011) was the leader of several of the parties, the National Order Party (Milli Nizam Partisi, 1970–1971), the National Salvation Party (Milli Selamet Partisi, 1972–1981), and the Welfare Party (Refah Partisi, 1983–1998); he also became a member of the Felicity Party (Saadet Partisi, 2003–2011). Current Turkish President Recep Tayyip Erdoğan has long been considered a champion of political Islam. The Justice and Development Party (AKP), which has dominated Turkish politics since 2002, is sometimes described as Islamist, but rejects such classification.

=== Contemporary era ===
==== By country ====
- Various Islamist political groups are dominant forces in the political systems of Afghanistan, Iran and Iraq.
- The Green Algeria Alliance is an Islamist coalition of political parties, created for the legislative election of 2012 in Algeria. It includes the Movement of Society for Peace (Hamas), Islamic Renaissance Movement (Ennahda) and the Movement for National Reform (Islah). The alliance is led by Bouguerra Soltani of Hamas. However, the incumbent coalition, comprising the FLN of President Abdelaziz Bouteflika and the RND of Prime Minister Ahmed Ouyahia, held on to power after winning a majority of seats, and the Islamist parties of the Green Algeria Alliance lost seats in the legislative election of 2012.
- Shia Islamist Al Wefaq, Salafi Islamist Al Asalah and Ikhwani(brotherhood) Islamist Al-Menbar Islamic Society are dominant democratic forces in Bahrain.
- In Indonesia, Prosperous Justice Party is the major opposition Islamist political party.
- Islamic Action Front is Jordan's Islamist political party and largest democratic political force in the country. The IAF's survival in Jordan is primarily due to its flexibility and less radical approach to politics.
- Hadas or "Islamic Constitutional Movement" is Kuwait's Sunni Islamist party.
- Islamic Group (Lebanon) is a Sunni Islamist political party in Lebanon. Hezbollah is a Shia Islamist political party in Lebanon.
- The Justice and Construction Party is the Muslim Brotherhood's political arm in Libya and the second largest political force in the country. The National Forces Alliance, the largest political group in country, does not believe the country should be run entirely by Sharia law or secular law, but does hold that Sharia should be "the main inspiration for legislation." Party leader Jibril has said the NFA is a moderate Islamic movement that recognises the importance of Islam in political life and favours Sharia as the basis of the law.
- The Pan-Malaysian Islamic Party is a major opposition party in Malaysia which espouses Islamism.
- The Justice and Development Party (Morocco) is the ruling party in Morocco since 29 November 2011, advocating Islamism and Islamic democracy.
- The Muslim Brotherhood of Syria is a Sunni Islamist force in Syria and very loosely affiliated to the Egyptian Muslim Brotherhood. It has also been called the "dominant group" or "dominant force" in the Arab Spring uprising in Syria. The group's stated political positions are moderate and in its most recent April 2012 manifesto it "pledges to respect individual rights", to promote pluralism and democracy.
- The Islamic Renaissance Party of Tajikistan is Tajikistan's Islamist party and main opposition and democratic force in the country.
- The Ennahda Movement, also known as Renaissance Party or simply Ennahda, is a moderate Islamist political party in Tunisia. On 1 March 2011, after the government of Zine El Abidine Ben Ali collapsed in the wake of the 2011 Tunisian revolution, Tunisia's interim government granted the group permission to form a political party. Since then it has become the biggest and most well-organized party in Tunisia, so far outdistancing its more secular competitors. In the Tunisian Constituent Assembly election of 2011, the first honest election in the country's history with a turnout of 51% of all eligible voters, the party won 37% of the popular vote and 89 (41%) of the 217 assembly seats, far more than any other party.
- Eastern Africa has become a hotbed of violent Islamic extremism since the late 1990s, one of the relevant movements being al-Shabaab, active in Somalia and Kenya, which emerged in response to the 2006–09 Ethiopian intervention in Somalia.
- West Africa has seen the rise of influential Islamic extremist organizations, notably Boko Haram in Northern Nigeria and al-Qaeda in the Islamic Maghreb in Mali.

== See also ==
- Clash of Civilizations
- Dominionism
- Islamicism (disambiguation)
