= Abdelkader Hachani =

Algerian politician (1956–1999)

- Born: 26 December 1956; Tamlouka, Algeria
- Died: 22 November 1999 (aged 42); Algiers, Algeria
- Occupation: Politician
- Known for: Winning in 1991 Algerian legislative election

Abdelkader Hachani (/ɑːbdɪlˈkɑːdər ˈhɑːʃəni/; Arabic: عبد القادر حشاني, romanized: ʿAbd al-Qādir Ḥashshānī; 26 December 1956 – 22 November 1999) was a leading figure and founding member of the Islamic Salvation Front (or FIS), an Algerian Islamist party.

== Early life ==
He was born in 1956 in Aïn Makhlouf or Skikda. He studied in the Algerian Petroleum Institute, an elite school for engineers, and after, started working at Sonatrach.

== Career ==
Following the arrests of Abassi Madani and Ali Belhadj on 30 June 1991, he became the party's effective leader (after four days of contested leadership by Mohamed Said.) He led the party to victory in the National Assembly elections of December 1991; shortly afterwards, he was arrested on 22 January 1992.

As the Algerian Civil War raged, he was released in July 1997. The court handed him a sentence of five years, which he had already served waiting for the trial. He played a prominent role in negotiating the Islamic Salvation Army's (AIS) cease-fire of October 1997, but condemned President Abdelaziz Bouteflika's Civil Harmony Act.

== Death ==
Hachani was shot by an assassin in the waiting room of a dental clinic in the Bab El Oued district of Algiers on 22 November 1999, and he subsequently died in hospital. In December, the government announced that it had arrested Fouad Boulemia, a GIA member, for the murder; Boulemia was convicted in a controversial trial, sentenced to death, and then released.

Hachani was trained as a petrochemical engineer. Within FIS, he was considered a member of the Djaz'ara (Algerianist) wing. He left four children behind.
