= Fouad Boulemia =

Algerian guerrilla fighter

External image
- (Fouad Boulemia Mugshot)

Fouad Boulemia, born in 1973, is a former guerrilla of the Armed Islamic Group, found guilty of killing Abdelkader Hachani and of participating in the Bentalha massacre.

== Biography ==
Boulemia was a member of the Armed Islamic Group, an organisation fighting both the Algerian government and the Islamic Salvation Army and frequently targeting civilians, between the spring of 1995 and 1999.

Abdelkader Hachani, a leading member of the Islamic Salvation Front, was assassinated on November 22, 1999, soon after being released from prison. In December the government announced that it had arrested Fouad Boulemia for his murder.

Boulemia was sentenced to death on April 12, 2001 after a one-day trial. At the trial, he claimed to have been tortured by the secret services and threatened by General Toufik in person to force him to sign a confession that he now repudiated. This confession stated that, coincidentally finding himself in the dentist's waiting room with Hachani, he spontaneously decided to kill Hachani because Hachani was a leading figure of the Djaz'ara (Algerianisation) wing of the Islamic Salvation Front, and pulled out his weapon, shot Hachani, and ran away.

In this trial, he was questioned neither by his lawyer, Maître Khemis, nor by the prosecutor. Two witnesses reported seeing Boulemia shoot Hachani, although one was reported to have previously claimed to have seen a man named Abdelaoui, with a quite different physical appearance, shoot Hachani.

He was sentenced to death again on August 1, 2004, for taking part in the Bentalha massacre, where more than 200 villagers were killed by armed guerrillas.

He was released from Serkadji prison on March 10, 2006 (Liberté 11 March 2006), shortly after the Charter for Peace and National Reconciliation came into force.
