= Mohammed Touati =

Algerian politician (born 1937)

- Native name: محمد تواتي
- Nickname: El Mokh (the brain)
- Born: 1937 (age 88–89); Azzefoun, Tizi Ouzou Province, French Algeria (now Algeria)
- Allegiance: Algeria
- Service years: 1958-2005
- Rank: Major general
- Commands: National Gendarmerie
- Conflicts: Algerian War; Algerian Civil War
- Other work: Advisor to the President (1999-2005, 2011)

Mohammed Touati (Arabic: محمد تواتي ), nicknamed "El Mokh", is a former high-ranking Algerian military officer and politician.

== Biography ==
Touati was born around 1937 in Azzefoun, Tizi Ouzou province, then French Algeria. He joined a military school as a young child. At the time of Algerian independence, he was the chief of staff of the National Gendarmerie, afterwards becoming the chief of staff of the third military region under Khaled Nezzar. Touati later became the central director of military health services and finally advisor to the Minister of National Defense under chief of staff Mohamed Lamari.

During the presidency of Houari Boumédiène, Touati held several positions in the Ministry of National Defense. In 1992, he took part in the overthrow of Chadli Bendjedid, and the banning of the Islamic Salvation Front. During the Algerian Civil War, Touati was the head of the National Dialogue Commission between the Islamic Salvation Army and the Algerian government. Touati retired in 2005 under the presidency of Abdelaziz Bouteflika at the rank of major general, simultaneously resigning from his post as Advisor to the President on security matters and advisor to the headquarters of the Algerian People's National Army.

Touati returned to Algerian politics during the 2010–2012 Algerian protests of the Arab Spring. Despite past grievances with Bouteflika, Touati was renamed advisor to the president. Along with Mohamed Ali Boughazi, a more Islamist advisor to Bouteflika, Touati persuaded head of the Algerian senate Abdelkader Bensalah to carry out reforms adhering to the protesters' demands.
