= Rabeh Kebir =

Algerian Politician

Rabah Kebir (Arabic: رابح كبير) was an Algerian islamic leader, and a former leader of the Islamic Salvation Front (FIS), an islamic Algerian party which won the elections in the nineties. The dissolution of the FIS by military decree after its electoral victories in 1991-92 triggered the Algerian Civil War, in which the FIS-affiliated Islamic Salvation Army (AIS) and other militias fought the military-dominated government. Kebir spent most of the war years in exile in Germany, acting as a main figure in the party's political leadership.

In 1995, Kebir and Anwar Haddam both signed the Sant'Egidio Platform - a joint document by opposition parties demanding a reinstatement of democracy in Algeria - as representatives of FIS.

In 2006, Rabeh Kebir returned to Algeria upon being amnestied by the state, something which was given widespread coverage in the Algerian press, and was viewed by many as a milestone in the reconciliation efforts to bring the civil war to a definitive end. He remains formally banned from political activities, but has held press conferences declaring his intentions to return to politics despite this.
