= Sant'Egidio platform =

The Sant'Egidio Platform of January 13, 1995 was an attempt by most of the major Algerian opposition parties to create a framework for peace and plan to end to the Algerian Civil War. The escalating violence and extremism, which had been provoked by the military's cancellation of the legislative elections in 1991 that the Islamic Salvation Front (FIS), an Islamist party, were expected to win, compelled the major political parties to unite under the auspices of the Catholic Community of Sant'Egidio in Rome. The community had previously played an important role in the drafting of the Rome General Peace Accords in 1992 which ended the civil war in Mozambique. The presence of representatives from the FIS as well as the National Liberation Front (FLN) and Socialist Forces Front (FFS) at these negotiations was extremely significant; the three parties collectively accounted for 80 per cent of the votes in the 1991 election.

At the end of the negotiation period, a joint statement released by the parties in which they rejected violence to achieve political goals and called for respect of human rights and democracy. The final version of the platform included demands for the reinstatement of democracy through the holding of new parliamentary elections and the repeal of the dissolution of the FIS, independent investigations of human rights abuses following the coup d'état, the withdrawal of the Algerian army from the political sphere, and a renewed commitment to the Constitution.

The platform was meant to be a model of democratic governance and political reconciliation with the goal of restoring a national consensus and fostering an inclusive political culture in Algeria. The commitment by the FIS was significant as it revealed its commitment to the peaceful transition of political power, however at the time of signing fragmentation within the Islamists was already well entrenched, with both of its armed wings expressing dissatisfaction with the platform at the time of signing. The Islamic Salvation Army (AIS) called the platform as a diversion, while the increasingly radicalized Armed Islamic Group of Algeria (GIA) presented three ultimatums including punishment of secularist Algerian generals, the banning of the communist and atheist political parties and the liberation of important Islamist leaders, including Abdelhak Layada, from prison. Ultimately, the platform would never be implemented due to the lack of endorsement it received from the armed Islamists and categorical rejection by President Zeroul who denounced the platform as a threat to national sovereignty since it invited foreign intervention into the internal affairs of Algeria.

The platform was signed by:

- Ali Yahiya, representing the Algerian Human Rights League (LADDH).
- Abdelhamid Mehri, representing the National Liberation Front (FLN).
- Hocine Aït Ahmed and Ahmed Djeddai, representing the Socialist Forces Front (FFS).
- Rabah Kebir and Anwar Haddam, representing the Islamic Salvation Front (FIS).
- Louisa Hanoune, representing the Workers Party (PT).
- Ahmed Ben Bella and Khaled Bensmain, representing the Movement for Democracy in Algeria (MDA).
- Abdallah Djaballah, representing the Islamic Renaissance Movement (al-Nahda) party.
- Ahmed Ben Mouhammed, representing the Contemporary Muslim Algeria movement (JMC).

The original text of the accords, in French, can be found here or here (with a list of participants).
