= Yacine Hammadi =

Algerian politician (born 1973)

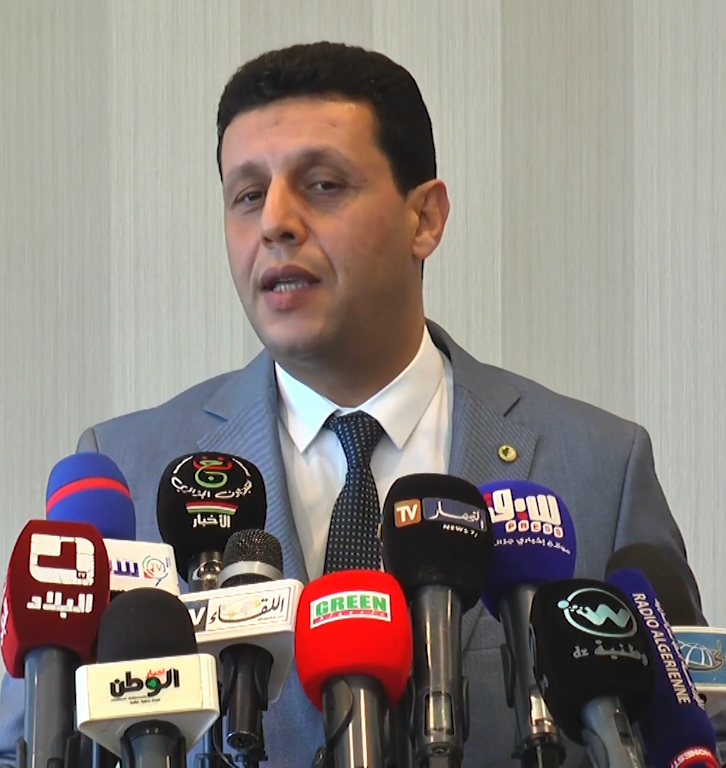
- Hammadi in 2022

Minister of Tourism and Handicrafts
- In office July 7, 2021 – March 16, 2023
- President: Abdelmadjid Tebboune
- Preceded by: Mohamed Ali Boughazi
- Succeeded by: Mokhtar Didouche

Personal details
- Born: November 22, 1973 (age 52) Khenchela, Algeria
- Education: National School of Administration; Faculty of Law, University of Algiers

Yacine Hammadi (born 22 November 1973) is an Algerian politician who served as the Minister of Tourism of Algeria between July 8, 2021, and March 18, 2023.

== Biography ==
Hammadi was born on November 22, 1973, in Khenchela, Algeria. He attended the National School of Administration where he graduated in 1992 with a baccalaureate in general administration. He then completed his master's in States and Public Institutions at the Faculty of Law at the University of Algiers. Hammadi then attended administration schools in Paris, with his first government experience being as a cabinet attaché in the walis of M'Sila, Batna, and Tamanrasset. He then became the secretary general of the Ministry of Tourism and Handicrafts of Algeria between 2020 and 2021.

Hammadi was appointed as Minister of Tourism and Handicrafts on July 7, 2021, by president Abdelmadjid Tebboune during a cabinet reshuffle. Hammadi's appointment ousted Mohamed Ali Boughazi as part of the integration of Benabderrahmane government. Under Hammadi's tenure, Algeria received money from Qatar to boost the Algerian tourism industry including in the state-owned Hotellerie, Tourisme, et Thermalisme company. The deal was under pressure by Tunisian interests, as an increase in Algerian tourism would draw visitors away from Tunisia.

Hammadi was sacked on March 16, 2023, and replaced by Mokhtar Didouche.
