= Algerian coup =

Algerian coup may refer to:

- The Algiers putsch of 1961, a failed coup d'état intended to force French President Charles de Gaulle not to abandon French Algeria
- The 1965 Algerian coup d'état, replacing President Ahmed Ben Bella with Houari Boumédiène
- The 1992 Algerian coup d'état, army staged a coup to prevent the political party Islamic Salvation Front from taking power
