= Anwar Haddam =

Algerian politician

Anwar Haddam (Arabic: أنور هدام) was a leader of the Islamic Salvation Front (FIS), an Islamist party in Algeria, and was elected to parliament on a FIS ticket in 1991 - Algeria's first multiparty elections. The dissolution of the FIS by military decree after its electoral victories in 1991-92 triggered the Algerian Civil War. Haddam spent most of the war years in exile in the United States of America, acting as a main figure in the party's political leadership. Algerian authorities unsuccessfully sought his extradition.

In 2004 Haddam resigned from FIS, and in 2007 co-founded the Movement for Liberty & Social Justice (MLJS).

== Life ==
A student and a disciple of the late Algerian thinker Malek Bennabi, Haddam has been involved with the Algerian Islamic Movement since 1972, and is one of the pioneers in its participation in the political arena. A nuclear physicist, he was a faculty member of the Physics Department of the University of Science and Technology of Algiers before being elected to the Algerian Parliament in December 1991 on behalf of the Islamic Front for Salvation (FIS). After the interruption of the Democratic process by the military in January 1992, he was given the mission of representing the winning party of majority in those elections, namely the FIS, in Europe and the US, and that of its international relations. Haddam has been and still is an advocate for a political solution to Algeria’s political authority crisis. Haddam was the initiator and one of the signatories of the historic “National Contract for a Peaceful & Political Solution to Algeria Crisis” found in Rome by the mean Algerians political parties in January 1995. In this Sant'Egidio Platform, Haddam, Abdelhamid Mehri and Hocine Ait Ahmed demanded a reinstatement of democracy in Algeria. Unfortunately the militaries rejected the platform engaging the country in a bloody civil war.

In September 2005, in recognition for his peaceful political efforts for the resolution of Algeria crisis, Haddam was invited by the Algerian President to return to the country to participate in the President project for national reconciliation. The infamous “eradicators” opposed a strong veto to Haddam’s return; a veto that is still in effect as of today. An invited speaker, Haddam lectured on the Algerian crisis and Political Islam at various institutions in Europe and in the US. A writer as well, he authored numerous articles, and has written two books on the Algerian crisis and national reconciliation. In the midst of the current popular uprising in some of the Arab countries, and in an attempt to avoid chaos in his home country Algeria, he is actively involved in building consensus between Algeria’s various political tendencies and the military for a comprehensive and gradual democratic change of Algeria’s 50 years old military backed regime.
