= Abdelhamid Mehri =

Algerian politician

- Born: April 1926; Constantine, French Algeria
- Died: January 30, 2012 (aged 85); Algiers, Algeria
- Military career
- Branch: National Liberation Front
- Other work: Politician

Abdelhamid Mehri (April 1926 – 30 January 2012) was an Algerian resistance fighter, soldier and politician.

Born into a destitute family in Constantine, Algeria, Abdelhamid Mehri joined the Algerian People's Party (PPA) at an early age. He studied in Tunisia, and developed contacts with the nationalist Neo Destour party. In Algeria, he became a prominent member of the PPA's successor organization Movement for the Triumph of Democratic Liberties (MTLD), and continued into the Algerian National Liberation Front (FLN), a guerrilla movement fighting for independence from French colonial rule. He was elected member of the GPRA, the FLN's exile government, as minister for Maghreb affairs in 1958; in 1961, he became minister of social and cultural affairs. After Algeria's independence in 1962, he briefly left politics, but gradually gained influence after the 1965 military coup d'état by col. Houari Boumédiène. In 1979, soon after Boumédiène's death, he was made member of the FLN's central committee and slowly rose in the ranks under president Chadli Bendjedid. After the 1988 October riots in Algeria, he succeeded hardliner Mohamed Cherif Messaâdia as FLN secretary-general.

After the subsequent change to a multiparty system, and the 1992 military coup, he brought the FLN into the opposition, and supported the Sant'Egidio platform urging national reconciliation with the Islamist current and the FIS as a solution for the Algerian Civil War, in a clear challenge to the éradicateur military elite that influenced Algerian politics behind the scenes. Soon after, he was gradually ousted from the party's central committee, which thereafter returned to supporting the security establishment. He died, aged 85, in Algiers.

== See also ==
- Algerian National Liberation Front
- University of Abdelhamid Mehri
