= Democratic Movement for Algerian Renewal =

Political party in Algeria

The Democratic Movement for Algerian Renewal (French: Mouvement Démocratique pour le Renouveau Algérien, MDRA) was a political party in Algeria.

== History ==
The party was founded by Krim Belkacem in Paris in October 1967. It was linked to a 1968 assassination attempt on President Houari Boumediene, which ultimately led to Belkacem being assassinated by the Sécurité Militaire two years later.

In 1989 the party was resurrected by Slimane Amirat, one of Belkacem's associates. Dominated by Kabyles, it gained few members and little support. In the 1991 parliamentary elections it received only 0.2% of the vote.
