= Habib Souaidia =

- Born: 16 April 1969 (age 57)

Habib Souaidia (Arabic: حبيب سوايدية), (born April 16, 1969, in Tébessa, Algeria), is an Algerian writer who served as a sub-lieutenant in the Algerian Special Forces before defecting to France during the Algerian Civil War.

== His career ==
Souaidia is known for his book "The Dirty War" (2001), in which he accuses the army of being behind massacres against civilians in the suburbs of the capital, especially Bentalha and Rais massacres. The former Algerian Minister of Defense, General Khaled Nezzar, announced on August 22, 2001, that he had filed a lawsuit against sub-lieutenant Habib Souaidia, who was a refugee in France.

An Algerian court sentenced him in absentia to twenty years in prison on April 29, 2002, for his participation in a project "to weaken the morale of the army and conspire to undermine the integrity of the national territory."

In January 2006, the Bouira court sentenced him to death in absentia, on charges of "kidnapping and killing" in July 1994 of three people in the Lakhdaria region, while he was in the region. Souaidia considered that the death sentence handed down to him for killing civilians is "unrealistic and evidence that the Algerian regime is a "vichy regime" that has thrown the country into a civil war."

== His work ==
- The Dirty War (French: La Sale Guerre), 2001.
- The dirty war trial (French: Le Procès de la sale guerre), (co-author), 2002.
- Algeria's Hirak: The Invention of an Uprising (French: Hirak en Algérie: L'invention d'un soulèvement), (co-author), 2020.
