= Lotfi Nezzar =

Algerian businessman

Lotfi Nezzar is an Algerian businessman, son of Major-General Khaled Nezzar. He is the vice-president of Smart Link Communication, an internet service provider. In July 2020, he was sentenced to 6 years in prison in absentia for money laundering, illicit transfer of funds and forgery and use of forgery to obtain undue privileges, an INTERPOL red notice was also filed against him, he was acquitted of all charges in November 2021.
