= Charter for Peace and National Reconciliation =

2005–06 Algerian Civil War amnesty document

The Charter for Peace and National Reconciliation was a charter proposed by Algerian President Abdelaziz Bouteflika, in an attempt to bring closure to the Algerian Civil War by offering an amnesty for most violence committed in it. The referendum on it was held on September 29, 2005, passing with 97%, and the charter was implemented as law on February 28, 2006.

== Background ==
The war broke out after Algerian military authorities suspended the country's first democratic national elections in the early nineties, to prevent an Islamist electoral victory. It is estimated to have caused around 200,000 dead or missing Algerians, with extremist fundamentalist groups generally held responsible for the most deaths, including atrocious massacres of civilians; but also with much criticism directed towards Algerian Special Forces and other military units for torture and "disappearances". Violence subsided in the mid-to late 1990s after a largely successful government campaign, but it still claims tens of lives each year, and some minor fundamentalist organizations continue to attack government and civilian targets.

== Charter and referendum ==
According to official results, the Charter was approved by 97.36% of the voters, amounting to 79.76% of the eligible electorate. The Charter, which follows on the 1999 law on "civil concord" and subsequent amnesty measures, proposed the following steps:

1. Amnesty for "terrorists" who have handed in their weapons, except those guilty of mass murder, bombing attacks on public installations, and rape. This includes those condemned in absentia. On the other hand, the outlawed Islamist party FIS will not be reinstated;
2. Implicit exoneration of the security services for the "disappearance" of more than 7,000 Algerians;
3. Financial and other compensation to the families of the dead and disappeared

President Bouteflika described the referendum as an effort to end bloodshed in the country. The civil war, which broke out in 1992, has claimed more than 200,000 lives and cost the country's infrastructure $30 billion.

== Implementation ==
The Charter left to the President's discretion detailed implementation of matters such as indemnities to victims of terrorism and their families, compensation for material damages, the future of rural militias raised by the military, the possible reintegration of those dismissed from work on political grounds, and the extent to which insurgent leaders who escaped abroad will be pardoned. These matters may be regulated by parliamentary legislation or by presidential decree.

== Criticism ==
The Charter has been criticized by human rights groups who argue that it institutionalises impunity and impedes any legal action against the security services, including the DRS, while proposing penalties for anyone who dares accuse those amnestied of crimes.

Furthermore, the families of victims and their organizations continue to demand information on the fate of the missing and to insist that "justice" must precede reconciliation. Many still fear the return of terrorists to their communities.

Finally, the largest radical Islamist group then still active – the Salafist Group for Preaching and Combat (GSPC), which is estimated to consist of a few hundred members and is allied with Al-Qaeda – totally rejected the Charter and called for a continuation of their "jihad" against the regime.

== Effects ==
Ali Belhadj, former #2 of the FIS was released, as well as Abdelhak Layada, one of the founder of the Armed Islamic Group (GIA), in March 2006. According to Libération, more than 300 Islamists have been recently released after the new law on "national reconciliation", and several hundreds more are expected to be freed soon.

== See also ==
- Algerian Civil War
- Islamic Salvation Front / Front Islamique du Salut (FIS)
- Mourad Ikhlef, amnestied
