= Mohamed Ali Boughazi =

Algerian politician

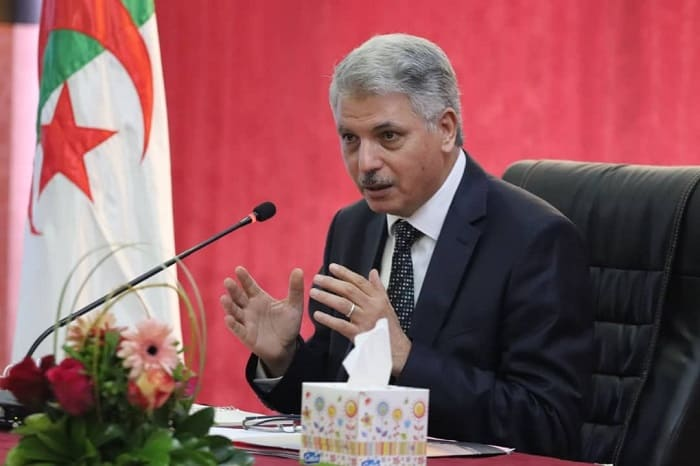
- Boughazi during a meeting with tourism executives in Algiers

Minister of Tourism, Crafts, and Family Work
- In office February 21, 2021 – July 8, 2021
- Preceded by: Mohamed Hamidou
- Succeeded by: Yacine Hammadi

Personal details
- Born: Skikda, Algeria

Mohamed Ali Boughazi is an Algerian politician who has held several ministerial positions in different Algerian governments.

== Biography ==
Boughazi was born in Skikda, Algeria. He received a PhD in applied mathematics, with two theses in 1987 and 1988. In 2012, he was considered a candidate to be Prime Minister or President of the People's National Assembly. He served as the political advisor to Algerian president Abdelaziz Bouteflika between 2012 and 2019. In 2021, Boughazi was appointed Minister of Tourism in the Third Djerad government, replacing Mohamed Hamidou.

In July 2021, following the 2021 Algerian parliamentary election, Boughazi was replaced by Yacine Hammadi.
