= Movement for Democracy in Algeria =

Political party in Algeria

Movement for Democracy in Algeria الحركة من أجل الديموقراطية في الجزائر Mouvement pour la démocratie en Algérie
- Founder: Ahmed Ben Bella
- Founded: 28 April 1982
- Legalised: 1990
- Banned: 10 June 1997
- Ideology: Moderate Islamism; Islamic Socialism; Progressivism; Arab nationalism Algerian nationalism Pan-Maghrebism; Anti-Zionism
- Political position: Left-wing
- Religion: Sunni Islam

The Movement for Democracy in Algeria (French: Mouvement pour la démocratie en Algérie) (MDA) was a political party in Algeria. It is moderately Islamist and boycotted the 2002 elections.

== History and profile ==
The Movement for Democracy in Algeria was founded by Ahmed Ben Bella in 1982. However, the party was legalized in 1990. In 1995, the party was one of the signatories of the Sant'Egidio platform, an attempt of many major opposition parties to put an end to the Algerian Civil War, which was brokered by the Italian Catholic Community of Sant'Egidio.
