= Mokhtar Didouche =

Algerian politician

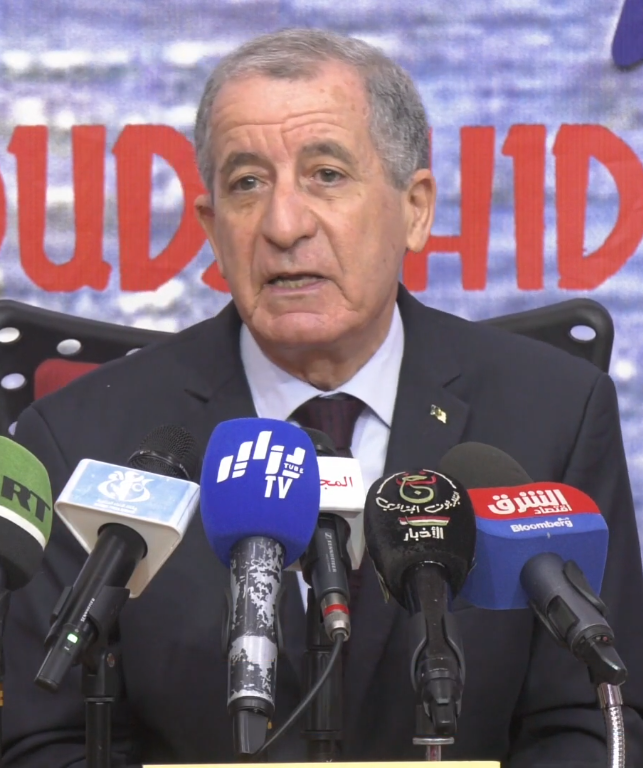
- Didouche in 2024

Minister of Tourism and Handicrafts and Family Work
- Incumbent
- Assumed office 16 March 2023
- President: Abdelmadjid Tebboune
- Prime Minister: Aymen Benabderrahmane; Nadir Larbaoui

Personal details
- Born: 24 February 1955 (age 71)
- Education: Diploma of Architecture

Mokhtar Didouche (born 24 February 1955) is the Algerian Minister of Tourism and Craftsmanship. He was appointed as minister on 16 March 2023.

== Education ==
Didouche holds a Diploma of Architecture (1980).

== Career ==
From 1982 to 1987, Didouche was the office manager at the Urban Planning Department in Wilayah of Algiers.

In 1988, he served as Head of department in the former People's Council of the City of Algiers.

Between 1990 and 2005, he was the Head of department, Director and Assistant Advisor to the Director General at the National Social Security Fund (CNAS).

From 2006 until 2017, Didouche worked at the Ministry of Tourism as senior executive.

Since 16 March 2023, he has served as Minister of Tourism and Handicrafts and Family Work.
