= 1992 Algerian coup d'état =

1992 Anti Islamist Coup in Algeria

- Part of Algerian Civil War
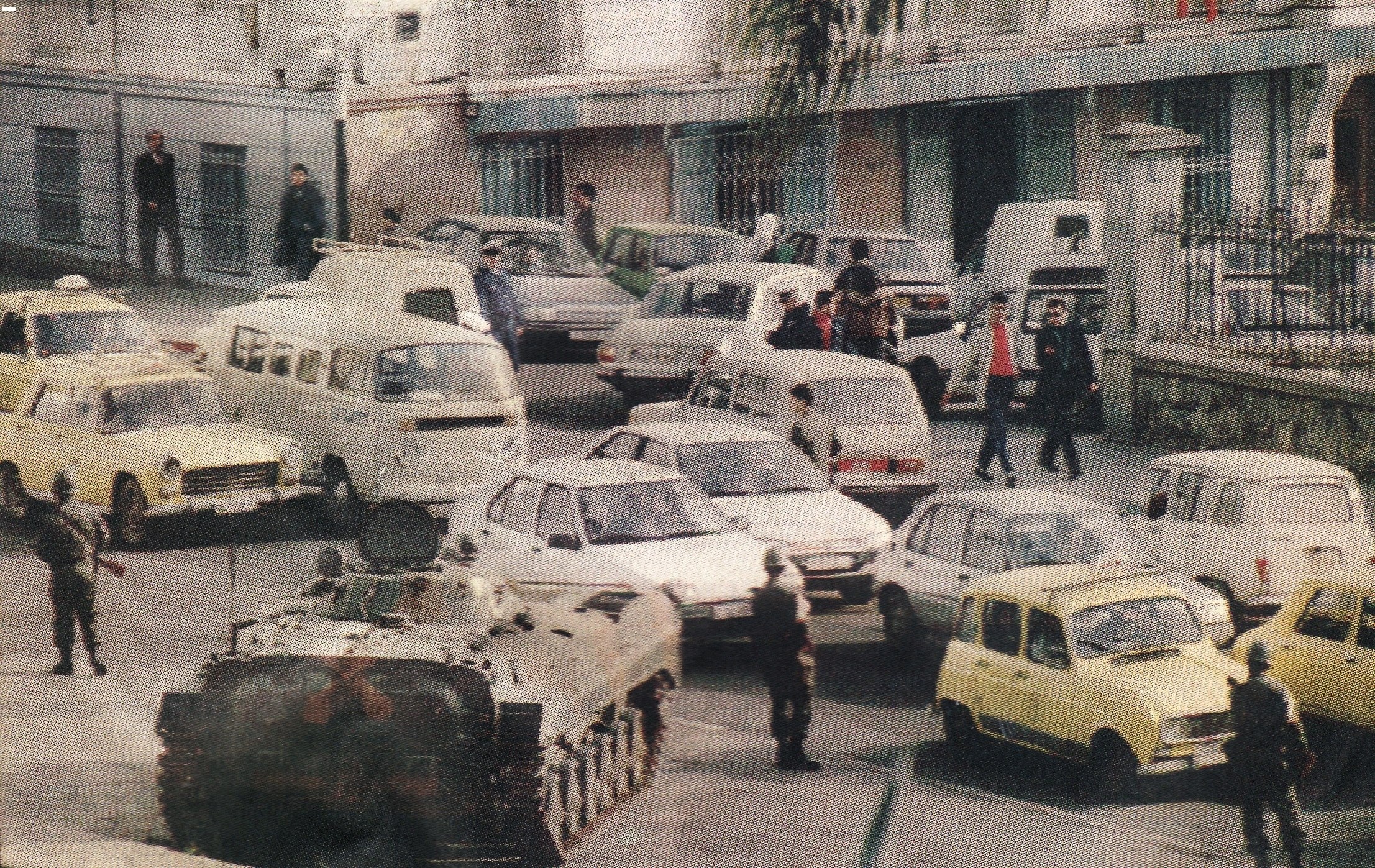
- Algerian military deployed in the streets of Algiers after the military coup against the Islamists, 12 January 1992
Date	11 January 1992
Location	Algiers, Algeria
Result	Coup succeeded: President Chadli Bendjedid ousted from office; 1991 parliamentary election cancelled; Start of the Algerian Civil War

Belligerents
Algerian People's National Army	President of Algeria

FIS plurality FIS majority Non-FIS majority Undecided No data available

The 1992 Algerian coup d'état took place on 11 January 1992. Concerned by the FIS (Islamic Salvation Front) victory in the first round of the 1991 parliamentary election, the army took action and cancelled the electoral process to prevent the forming of an Islamic state in Algeria. The army forced president Chadli Bendjedid to resign and brought in the exiled Mohamed Boudiaf to serve as the new president.

The military argued that they had done this to "safeguard Algeria's republican institutions from political and radical Islamists" and to prevent Algeria from turning into a theocratic state. The coup led to the start of the Algerian Civil War.

== Background ==
Preceding the coup were social-political-economic problems such as a 1986 collapse of oil prices (at the time 95% of Algerian exports and 60% of the government budget came from petroleum), a population explosion without jobs or housing to accommodate it, rhetoric of Third World socialism solidarity by the party and government masking "corruption on a grand scale" (and discrediting the "vocabulary of socialism"), a concentration of power and resources by the military and FLN party elite originating from the east-side of Algeria. The ruling FLN (National Liberation Front (Algeria)) "banned all opposition" but the oil money used to pacify the population had been decimated. On 4 October 1988, massive riots and destruction by the urban poor was met with "ruthless" police response killing hundreds.

In 1989, the FIS was founded. It was influenced by the Muslim Brotherhood and quickly gained popularity in Algeria. It won control of many local governments in the June 1990 municipal elections, and won the first round of the Algerian legislative election in December 1991 with twice as many votes as the ruling FLN. The FIS had made open threats against the ruling pouvoir, condemning them as unpatriotic and pro-French, as well as financially corrupt. Additionally, FIS leadership was at best divided on the desirability of democracy, and some Algerian non-Islamists expressed fears that a FIS government would be, as U.S. Assistant Secretary of State Edward Djerejian put it, "one person, one vote, one time".

== Plot ==
A secret meeting was held in December 1991 to discuss the options available to the military, attended by all senior generals including Khaled Nezzar, Abdelmalek Guenaizia, leaders of the navy, gendarmerie and security services. They agreed that the FIS's path to victory should be blocked by using constitutional mechanisms rather than by physical force. They also decided that president Chadli Bendjedid had to resign because this would force the suspension of the second round of the election.

== Coup ==
On 11 January 1992, a group of army generals known as the Janviérists took power and forced president Chadli Bendjedid to resign. Chadli appeared on national television and announced his resignation in a quiet voice: "Given the difficulty and gravity of the current situation, I consider my resignation necessary to protect the unity of the people and the security of the country". He was replaced with a High Council of State. The army then moved onto the streets of Algiers the next day as tanks and troops guarded important locations in the city, and suspended the electoral process. The High Council of State announced the appointment of a HCE as a collective successor to Chadli, comprising Khaled Nezzar, Ali Kafi, Tijani Haddam, Ali Haroun and Mohamed Boudiaf.

Mohamed Boudiaf was appointed the new president of Algeria. He arrived from Morocco after an official absence of 28 years in exile. He was chosen to give the regime a fresh image and an enhanced sense of legitimacy to attract popular support for the regime, but was assassinated several months later in June. The army then rounded up tens of thousands of FIS supporters and put them in camps in the middle of the Algerian Desert.

=== Reaction ===
According to John Enteils, "the Arab world had never before experienced such a genuinely populist expression of democratic aspirations... Yet when the army overturned the whole democratic experiment in January 1992, the United States willingly accepted the results... In short, a democratically elected Islamist government hostile to American hegemonic aspirations in the region... was considered unacceptable in Washington."

Arguments against this line include that Washington's influence was likely limited with Algeria's ruling party, the nominally anti-capitalist, anti-secular, anti-European culture, pro-Islamic identity third world socialist FLN; that after its massive 1990 municipal elections victory, the FIS was praised for its virtue in governance, but the solutions it offered to Algeria's problems -- forced hijab, separate swimming areas, banning French culture and any use of the French language, liquor stores, video shops, enforcing sharia law in general -- however popular, were unlikely to be much help against Algeria's long-term problems; that while the Islamists were very much in favor of the opportunity to gain power through democratic elections, that doesn't mean they would have surrendered power after elections later on, and statements by its leaders before the coup, as well as the killings of hundreds of civilians, foreign and domestic, by Islamist guerillas in the subsequent bloody and destructive civil war do not inspire confidence that it would have, if the coup had never happened.
