= Islamic Salvation Army =

Armed wing of the Islamic Salvation Front

- الجيش الإسلامي للإنقاذ
- Leaders: Abdelkader Chebouti (18 July-November 1994); Madani Mezrag (November 1994-13 January 2000)
- Founded: 18 July 1994
- Dissolved: 13 January 2000
- Country: Algeria
- Allegiance: Abbasi Madani; Ali Benhadj
- Ideology: Sunni Islamism; Islamic fundamentalism Jihadism; Arab nationalism Qutbism; Pan-Islamism; Anti-communism
- Size: 2,000 (1992); 40,000 (1994); 10,000 (1996)
- Wars: Algerian civil war

The Islamic Salvation Army (AIS; Arabic: الجيش الإسلامي للإنقاذ) was the armed wing of the Islamic Salvation Front, an Islamist political party which was founded in Algeria on 18 July 1994. The Islamic Salvation Front was ordered to dissolve by the Supreme Court of Algeria in 1992. Since then, many of its members have either been arrested or forced into exile. The army had about 4,000 men in western and eastern Algeria, and later 40,000 men in 1994. It pledged allegiance to imprisoned FIS leaders Abbasi Madani and Ali Benhadj. It was supported by Libya and Saudi private donors, and allegedly by Morocco and Iran.

The Islamic Salvation Army wanted to distance itself from the Armed Islamic Group (GIA) which indiscriminately bombed and massacred civilians. Unlike the GIA, the AIS fought security forces instead of civilians and conducted guerrilla warfare. The AIS tried to control territories and gained some support in rural areas, and it fought a few battles against the GIA in 1995 and 1996. As the GIA rose, the FIS-loyalist guerillas attempted to unite their forces. In July 1994, the Islamic Armed Movement (MIA), together with the remainder of the Islamic State Movement (MEI) and a variety of smaller groups, united as the Islamic Salvation Army, declaring their allegiance to FIS and strengthening FIS' hand for the negotiations. It was initially headed by MIA's Abdelkader Chebouti, who was succeeded in November 1994 by MEI's Madani Mezrag. It rejected all truces with the government. By the end of 1994, it controlled over half the guerrillas of the east and west, but barely 20% in the center, near the capital, where the GIA were mainly based.

The Islamic Salvation Army was formed on 18 July 1994 after the 1991 Algerian legislative election which resulted in an FIS victory was interrupted by the 1992 Algerian coup d'état led by the military, which wanted to prevent Algeria from turning into an Islamic state. The Islamic Salvation Front was banned by the government on 4 March 1992. On 24 September 1997, the leader of the Islamic Salvation Army Madani Mezrag declared a ceasefire. The FIS lost influence after this and was dissolved on 13 January 2000 after the Civil Concord decreed by president Abdelaziz Bouteflika.
