= Ali Benhadj =

Islamist Algerian politician and preacher, Islamic Salvation Front co-founder

- علي بن الحاج
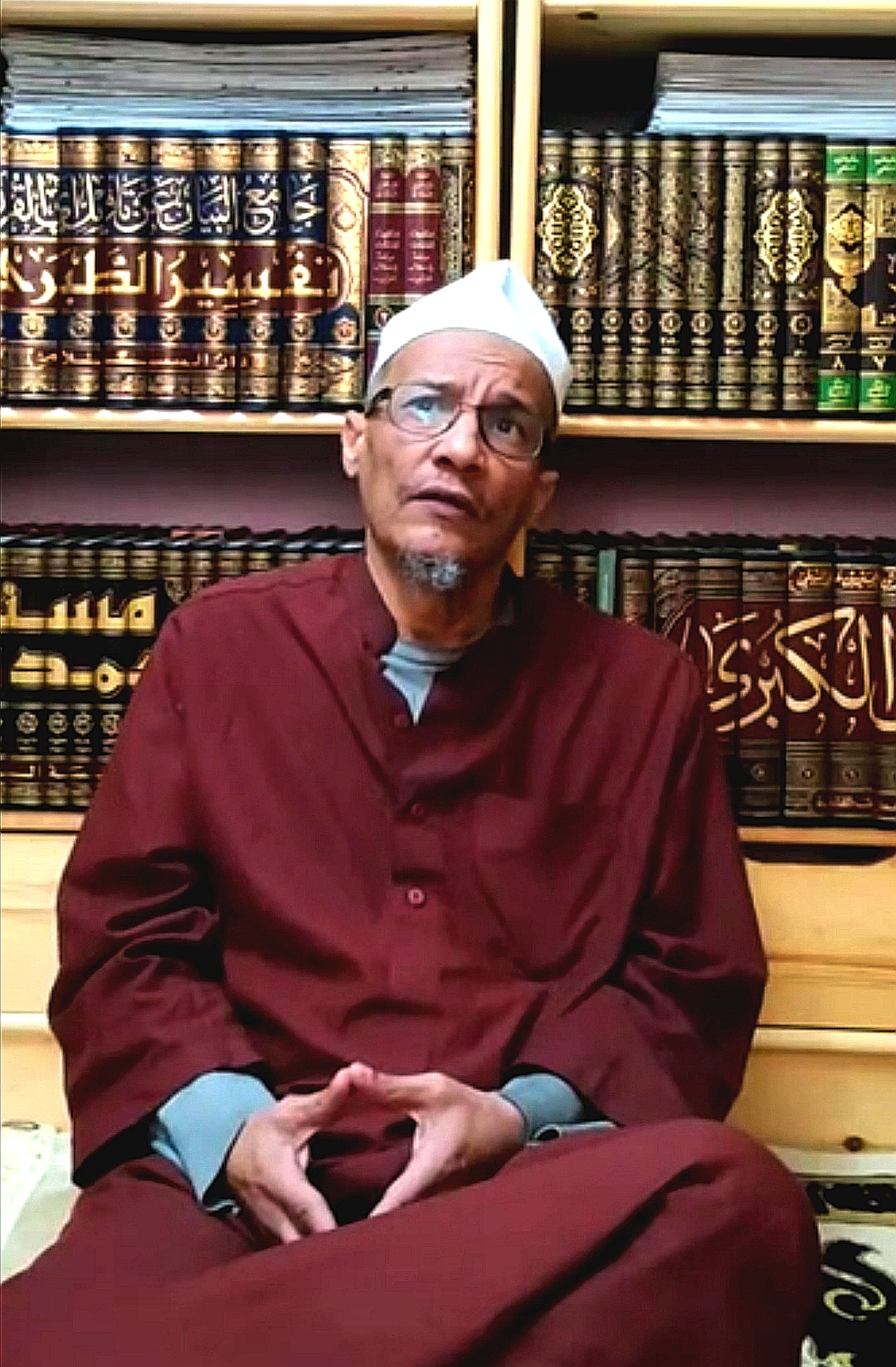
- Born: 16 December 1956 (age 69); Tunis, Tunisia
- Occupation: preacher
- Years active: 1970–present
- Children: 5

Vice President Islamic Salvation Front
- In office 1989–1992
- Website: alibenhadj.net

Ali Benhadj (also Belhadj; Arabic: علي بلحاج or علي بن الحاج, romanized: ʿAlī ibn al-Ḥajj; born 16 December 1956) is an Algerian Islamist activist and preacher and cofounder of the Islamic Salvation Front (FIS) political party, the winner of the June 1990 local elections and the 1991 Algerian legislative election.

== Biography ==
Born in 1956 in Tunis to parents of Algerian origin from the wilaya (province) of Adrar in Algeria, Benhadj became a teacher of Arabic and an Islamist activist in the 1970s. He had close ties to Mustafa Bouyali's Islamic Armed Movement (MIA), and was arrested in 1983 and sentence in 1985 by a state security court. In 1989, after the Algerian Constitution was changed to allow multiparty democracy, he helped found the FIS, an Islamist party which won the first free elections in Algeria since its independence. He was considered the co-head or number two leader of the FIS, along with president Abassi Madani. During this period, he was a preacher at the famous Al-Sunna mosque in Bab el-Oued, a district in Algiers.

In 1991, soon after FIS had finished a General strike and massive peaceful demonstrations in Algiers that was disrupted by a sudden attack by snipers and armed forces that ended with the death of over one thousand civilians in one day and thousands injured, he, along with FIS president Abassi Madani, was arrested and jailed on charges of threatening state security. In late 1991, FIS won the first round of parliamentary elections, which were then called off by the military, who banned FIS; Benhadj remained in jail before and throughout all of the Algerian Civil War that followed. In December 1994, the Islamist hijackers of Air France Flight 8969 demanded Ali Benhadj's release along with Abbassi Madani. The hijackers later dropped those demands in exchange for fuel to fly to France from Algeria. He was released only after serving a 12-year sentence in 2003 under the condition of abstaining from all political activity. Benhadj has been called a charismatic preacher.

In July 2005, he was arrested for making a statement on Al-Jazeera which praised Iraqi insurgents and condemned Algeria for sending diplomats to Iraq shortly after two Algerian diplomats (Ali Belaroussi and Azzedine Belkadi) had been kidnapped. He was released just under a year later in March 2006, under the Charter for Peace and National Reconciliation.

He joined the protests in Bab El Oued on 5 January 2011 and was arrested the same day. He was charged a few days later with "harming state security and inciting an armed rebellion."

On 25 July 2011, Benhadj's 23-year-old son Abdelkahar, along with three-would be suicide bombers and two of his associates, were shot dead by Algerian security forces while planning a suicide bombing at a military checkpoint in Algiers. Abdelkahar Benhadj was considered to be a high ranking senior leader in Al Qaeda in the Islamic Maghreb.

In January 2015 he called for early presidential election as "a first step towards solving the country's political crisis" (Algerian President Abdelaziz Bouteflika suffered a stroke in April 2014).

== Views ==
Seen as the spiritual leader of the most hardline factions of the FIS, he was against women working and condemned democracy as a Western innovation, while emphasizing the importance of Islamic education. In 1990 declared his intention, "to ban France from Algeria intellectually and ideologically, and be done, once and for all, with those whom France has nursed with her poisoned milk." Benhadj declared that:

Democracy is a stranger in the House of God. Guard yourself against those who say that the notion of democracy exists in Islam. There is no democracy in Islam. There exists only the shura (consultation) with its rules and constraints. ... We are not a nation that thinks in terms of majority-minority. The majority does not express the truth.

He was also violently against political pluralism:

Multi-partism is not tolerated unless it agrees with the single framework of Islam ... If people vote against the Law of God ... this is nothing other than blasphemy. The ulama [religious scholars] will order the death of the offenders who have substituted their authority for that of God.

He described his favourite authors as Ibn Taymiyya, and Ibn al-Qayyim, as well as the more recent Hassan al-Banna and Sayyid Qutb. However, his ideology is distinct from his favorite authors.

== Personal life ==
Benhadj is married and has five children.
