= Khaled Nezzar =

Algerian general (1937–2023)

- خالد نزار
- Born: 25 December 1937; Seriana, Batna, French Algeria
- Died: 29 December 2023 (aged 86); Algiers, Algeria
- Military career
- Branch: Algerian People's National Armed Forces (Army) High Council of State (Algeria)
- Service years: 1949–1993
- Rank: Major-General
- Commands: Chief of Staff of the People's National Army
- Conflicts: Algerian Civil War

Major-General Khaled Nezzar (Arabic: خالد نزّار; 25 December 1937 – 29 December 2023) was an Algerian general and a member of the High Council of State of Algeria. He was born in the douar of Thlet, in Seriana in the Batna region. His father, Rahal Nezzar, was a former non-commissioned officer in the French army who had turned to farming after World War II. His mother died in 1941.

== Military career ==
After studying in the local native school (école indigène), Nezzar was transferred to a school for troops' children at Koléa, and then joined the French army, studying at the Strasbourg military school in Algiers where non-commissioned officers were trained. Nezzar subsequently served with the 13e Régiment de tirailleurs before gaining commissioned rank as a junior officer in the French Army.

Nezzar was of a number of Algerian professional soldiers who gained their initial training and experience serving with the French forces before defecting to the nationalist FLN forces during the final years of the War of Independence. Nezzar and another Muslim officer reached Tunis by way of Rome in 1958. His French service made him valuable as a staff officer to the FLN, although he recalled receiving the cool greeting "you left it late" from his new commander.

After independence in 1962, Nezzar remained in the new Algerian army, and started rising through the ranks. He went to Moscow in 1964 to receive military training at the M. V. Frunze Military Academy. Upon his return in 1965, he was named Director of Materiel in the Ministry of National Defense. Soon after Houari Boumedienne's coup, he was put in charge of the Saharan 2nd Motorized Infantry, based around Ain Sefra. In 1968, he was sent to Egypt to help guard the Egypt–Israel line of control, which at the time (just after the Six-Day War) witnessed regular artillery bombardments and aerial bombings. After returning from Egypt, he was put in charge of training Algeria's first paratroopers, with Soviet help, at Biskra.

In 1975, he went through further training at the École supérieure de guerre in Paris; at this point, he was a Lieutenant-Colonel. He returned in his second year without finishing his studies, having been summoned back to command troops in Tindouf at the height of the Moroccan-Algerian conflict over the Western Sahara issue. He spent the next seven years in the Béchar-Tindouf area.

After Chadli Bendjedid took power, Nezzar was sent away from Tindouf to the east, a decision which he resented. He rose rapidly through the ranks, and, by 1988, he was a ground forces commander at Ain Naadja in Algiers, where he played a significant role in suppressing the "Black October" riots.

== Political career ==
Nezzar became Minister of Defense in July 1990. In his memoirs, he recounts his hostility during this period to the interim prime minister Mouloud Hamrouche and president Chadli Bendjedid, whom he accuses of effectively "conniving" with the Islamic Salvation Front for the sake of increasing their power.

After the Islamic Salvation Front's electoral victory in 1991, he, along with Larbi Belkheir, was among the leading generals who decided to depose then-President Chadli Bendjedid and annul the elections, marking the beginning of the Algerian Civil War. He became a member of the new provisional governing body, the High Council of State (HCS), when it was established in January 1991. He survived an assassination attempt in February 1993 in El Biar (Algiers), and gave up his position five months later, when the HCS's mandate terminated. In 1999, he (unusual for an Algerian general) published his memoirs, written in French and translated into Arabic.

== Personal life ==
In October 2001, Khaled Nezzar's son Lotfi violently attacked a Le Matin reporter, Sid Ahmed Semiane, for having criticized his father. He had already threatened him several times. Nezzar apologized for his son's actions three days later; his son was eventually found guilty in court, and paid a fine of 12 euros.

In 2002, Nezzar sued the dissident officer Habib Souaidia in Paris for defamation. Souaidia had accused him of "being responsible for the assassination of thousands of people", blaming him and other generals for starting the war and committing massacres attributed to the Armed Islamic Group. As the trial began, nine Algerians in Paris filed complaints against Nezzar for torture and inhumane treatment; he left Paris before these could be evaluated, saying he did not want to risk a diplomatic incident. The court found Souaidia innocent.

=== Death ===
Nezzar died in Algiers on 29 December 2023, at the age of 86.
