= 1991 Algerian parliamentary election =

- 26 December 1991
- All 430 seats in the People's National Assembly (Note: Only results for 232 seats were announced.); 216 seats needed for a majority
- Turnout: 59.00% ▼28.48pp
Party	Leader	Vote %	Seats
FIS	Abdelkader Hachani	47.27	188
FLN	Abdelhamid Mehri	23.38	16
FFS	Hocine Aït Ahmed	7.40	25
This lists parties that won seats. See the complete results below.

Prime Minister before	Prime Minister after
Sid Ahmed Ghozali; FLN	Election results annulled Sid Ahmed Ghozali remains Prime Minister

Parliamentary elections were held in Algeria on 26 December 1991. They were the first multi-party parliamentary elections since independence, but the second round due to be held on 16 January 1992 was cancelled five days before by a military coup after the military expressed concerns that the Islamic Salvation Front, which was almost certain to win more than the three-fourths majority of seats required to change the constitution, would form an Islamic state. This led to the outbreak of the Algerian Civil War.

Of 430 seats contested, 232 were won outright with 50% or more of the first-round vote; the remaining 198 would have proceeded to a second round contested only by the two candidates with the highest number of votes. Voter turnout in the first-round was 59%.

== Results ==
Party	Votes	%	Seats
Islamic Salvation Front	3,260,222	47.27	188
National Liberation Front	1,612,947	23.38	16
Socialist Forces Front	510,661	7.40	25
Movement of Society for Peace	368,697	5.35	0
Rally for Culture and Democracy	200,267	2.90	0
Islamic Renaissance Movement	150,093	2.18	0
Movement for Democracy in Algeria	135,882	1.97	0
Party of Algerian Renewal	67,828	0.98	0
National Party for Solidarity and Development	48,208	0.70	0
Social Democratic Party	28,638	0.42	0
Algerian Movement for Justice and Development	27,623	0.40	0
Democratic Movement for Algerian Renewal	10,934	0.16	0
Arab-Islamic Rally	10,824	0.16	0
Liberal Social Party	9,272	0.13	0
Alliance for Justice and Freedom	9,898	0.14	0
Union for Democracy and Freedom	9,298	0.13	0
Algerian Boumedien Islamic Rally	9,037	0.13	0
Democratic Youth Movement	8,902	0.13	0
Union of Democratic Forces	8,853	0.13	0
People's Unity Party	7,731	0.11	0
Party of Democratic Islamic Arab Union	7,283	0.11	0
National Alliance of Independent Democrats	6,867	0.10	0
Democratic Generation	6,726	0.10	0
National Salvation Front	6,575	0.10	0
Workers' Socialist Party	6,464	0.09	0
Popular Association for Unity and Action	6,455	0.09	0
Ecology and Liberty	5,558	0.08	0
Progressive Republican Party	4,872	0.07	0
Union of Forces for Progress	4,184	0.06	0
Jihad Front for Unity	3,899	0.06	0
Independence Generations' Front	3,860	0.06	0
Republican Party	3,668	0.05	0
Front for Algerian Democratic Authenticity	3,600	0.05	0
Algerian Liberal Party	2,934	0.04	0
Algerian Party of the Essential Man	2,698	0.04	0
Ahd 54	2,490	0.04	0
Democratic Progressive Party	2,380	0.03	0
Algerian National Rally	2,045	0.03	0
Party of Law	1,476	0.02	0
Social Movement for Authenticity	1,225	0.02	0
Algerian Party for Justice and Progress	1,222	0.02	0
Social Justice Party	1,186	0.02	0
Popular Forces' Front	1,067	0.02	0
Rally for National Unity	933	0.01	0
Organisation of the Forces of Free Revolutionary Islamic Algeria	930	0.01	0
Algerian Nation's Youth Rally	928	0.01	0
Algerian National Party	816	0.01	0
Movement for the Islamic Risala	188	0.00	0
National Rally for Progress	111	0.00	0
Independents	309,264	4.48	3
Undetermined			198
Total	6,897,719	100.00	430
Valid votes	6,897,719	88.18	
Invalid/blank votes	924,906	11.82	
Total votes	7,822,625	100.00	
Registered voters/turnout	13,258,554	59.00	
Source: Nohlen et al.
