= Abbassi Madani =

Algerian politician, Islamic Salvation Front founder (1931–2019)

President of the Islamic Salvation Front

Personal details
- Born: 28 February 1931 Diyar Ben Aissa, Sidi Okba
- Died: 24 April 2019 (aged 88) Doha, Qatar

Abbassi Madani (Arabic: عباسي مدني; 28 February 1931 – 24 April 2019) was an Algerian politician who was the President of the Islamic Salvation Front. As its leader, he became the voice of a large part of the dispossessed Algerian youth.

== Career ==
Madani was born in Diyar Ben Aissa, Sidi Okba, now in Biskra Province. In his youth he joined the National Liberation Front (FLN) and participated in the first day of the Algerian War of Independence, 1 November 1954, by planting a bomb at an Algiers radio facility, but was arrested by the French on 17 November 1954, and remained in jail until independence in 1962. After studying for a doctorate in educational psychology in London from 1975 to 1978, he became a professor of educational sciences at the University of Algiers. Madani grew critical of the FLN's socialist orientation, and in 1989, after the Algerian Constitution was changed to allow multiparty democracy, he co-founded the Islamic Salvation Front (FIS), which rapidly grew to enjoy success in the ensuing local elections. Madani contended that the Islamic essence of November 1954 was betrayed by the Charters of Tripoli and Algeria, along with other charters upheld by Houari Boumediene and Chadli Bendjedid.

== Political positions ==
Madani advocated, on the one hand, the "stepwise" introduction of Sharia (Islamic Law) and called Muhammad ibn Abd al-Wahhab, the founder of the dominant religious movement in Saudi Arabia, the "avant-garde of the reform-oriented Muslim world". On the other hand, he declared that his party had no intention to impose the wearing of the veil or to ban women from driving. He named the Muslim reformer Muhammad Abduh as part of the same "avant-garde" as Abd al-Wahab. In a 1990 interview he said he wanted to suppress "usury" in banking and to substantially reduce taxes, while he avoided answering a question about the financing of development projects.

In 1990, the Algerian Government pushed a new electoral law which was unanimously condemned by all Algerian opposition parties. Protesting against this law, Madani helped organize a general strike and massive peaceful demonstrations in Algiers. An attack by armed forces ended the protest. After the strike, Madani was arrested and sentenced to 12 years imprisonment following charges of threatening state security. The UN Human Rights Committee investigated the arrest made by the military court of Blida, during its 89th session in New York in 2007. The committee concluded that the trial and sentencing of Madani by the military court constituted a violation of article 14 of the Covenant.

== Retirement ==
Politically, he was widely considered to represent the moderate wing of FIS, contrasted with Ali Belhadj's more hardline views. His positions included free markets, early Islamic education, Arabization of education and government, segregation of the sexes, and sharia-based law. He expressed support for democracy, but with the reservation that it could not override Sharia law.

In January 2011, Agence France-Presse announced, in connection with ongoing demonstrations in Algeria, that Madani had fled to Qatar. Madani died on 24 April 2019.

== Bibliography ==
- M. Al-Ahnaf; B. Botiveau; F. Fregosi (1991). L'Algérie par ses islamistes. Paris: Karthala. ISBN 2-86537-318-5.
