= Islamic Salvation Front =

1989–1992 Islamist political party in Algeria

Islamic Salvation Front الجبهة الإسلامية للإنقاذ
- French name: Front islamique du salut
- Founders: Abbassi Madani; Ali Belhadj
- Founded: 18 February 1989
- Registered: 16 September 1989
- Banned: 4 March 1992
- Armed wing: Islamic Salvation Army
- Ideology: Sunni Islamism; Islamic fundamentalism Salafism; Jihadism; Arab nationalism Qutbism; Pan-Islamism; Anti-communism
- Religion: Sunni Islam
- Slogan: "And ye were on the brink of the pit of Fire, and He saved you from it." (Al Imran: 103)
- People's National Assembly (1991): 188 / 430 (44%)
- People's Provincial Assembly (1990): 31 / 48 (65%)
- Municipalities (1990): 856 / 1,541 (56%)
- People's Municipal Assembly (1990): 5,987 / 13,113 (46%)

Party flag

The Islamic Salvation Front (Arabic: الجبهة الإسلامية للإنقاذ, romanized: al-Jabhah al-Islāmiyah lil-Inqādh; French: Front islamique du salut, FIS) was an Islamist political party in Algeria. The party had two major leaders representing its two bases of its support; Abbassi Madani appealed to pious small businessmen, and Ali Belhadj appealed to the angry, often unemployed youth of Algeria.

Officially made legal as a political party in September 1989, less than a year later the FIS received more than half of valid votes cast by Algerians in the 1990 local government elections. When it appeared to be winning a general election in January 1992, a military coup dismantled the party, interning thousands of its officials in the Sahara. It was officially banned two months later. Its armed wing, the Islamic Salvation Army (AIS), fought in the Algerian Civil War against the Algerian government from July 1994 until its dissolution in January 2000.

== Goals ==
The founders and leaders of the FIS did not agree on all issues, but agreed on the core objective of establishing an Islamic state ruled by sharia law. FIS hurriedly assembled a platform in 1989, the Projet de Programme du Front Islamique du Salut, which was widely criticized as vague.

Its 1990 electoral victory, giving it control of many local governments, led to the imposing of the veil on female municipal employees, pressuring of liquor stores, video shops and other establishments perceived as un-Islamic to close, and segregation of bathing areas by gender.

Elimination of the French language and culture was an important issue for many in the FIS such as co-leader Ali Benhadj, who in 1990 declared his intention "to ban France from Algeria intellectually and ideologically, and be done, once and for all, with those whom France has nursed with her poisoned milk." Devout activists removed satellite dishes of households receiving European satellite broadcast in favor of Arab satellite dishes receiving Saudi broadcasts. Educationally, the party was committed to continue the Arabization of the educational system by shifting the language of instruction in more institutions, such as medical and technological schools, from French to Arabic. Large numbers of recent graduates, the first post-independence generation educated mainly in Arabic, liked this measure, as they had found the continued use of French in higher education and public life jarring and disadvantageous.

Following the first National Assembly ballot, the FIS issued a second pamphlet. Economically, it strongly criticized Algeria's planned economy, urging the need to protect the private sector and encourage competition – earning it support from traders and small businessmen – and urged the establishment of Islamic banking. However, leaders Abbassi Madani and Abdelkader Hachani both made statements opposed to opening the country to competition from foreign business.

Socially, it suggested that women should be given a financial incentive to stay at home rather than working outside, thus introducing sexual segregation (Ali Belhadj called it immoral for men and women to work in the same office) with the supposed goal of increasing the number of jobs available to men in a time of chronic unemployment.

Politically, the contradiction between Madani and Belhadj's words was noteworthy: Madani condemned violence "from wherever it came", and expressed his commitment to democracy and resolve to "respect the minority, even if it is composed of one vote".

Belhadj said, "There is no democracy in Islam" and "If people vote against the Law of God ... this is nothing other than blasphemy. The ulama will order the death of the offenders who have substituted their authority for that of God".

In an interview with Daniel Pipes and Patrick Clawson, Anwar Haddam rejected this view of Belhadj, saying, "He has been misquoted. He has been accused of things out of bitterness. He wrote a book in which he expressed himself clearly in favor of democracy. In it, he writes on page 91 that "the West progressed by defeating tyranny and preserving freedoms; this is the secret of the Western world's remarkable progress." Belhadj refers many times to the Western world and to those very values that people are trying to deny us within our own borders."

== History ==
=== Background ===
Social conditions that led to formation and popularity of the FIS included a population explosion in the 1960s and 70s that outstripped the stagnant economy's ability to supply jobs, housing, food and urban infrastructure to massive numbers of young in the urban areas; (Note: In 1989, 40 percent of Algeria's population of 24 million were under 15 years of age; the urban population was in excess of 50 percent of the total population; the birthrate was 3.1% per year) a collapse in price of oil, whose sale supplied 95% of Algeria's exports and 60% of the government's budget; a single-party state ostensibly based on socialism, anti-imperialism, and popular democracy but ruled by high level military and party nomenklatura from the east side of the country; "corruption on a grand scale"; and in response to these issues, "the most serious riots since independence" occurred in October 1988 when thousands of urban youth took control of the streets.

Earlier Salafist movements in Algeria included the Association of Muslim Ulemas founded in 1931 by Abdel Hamid Ben Badis, which like the Muslim Brotherhood believed that religion should be the "absolute focus of private life and society", preached against the "superstitions" of popular Islam and French culture or secularism in Algeria, but did not venture into politics or promotion of an Islamic state.

After independence the government of Houari Boumediene began a campaign of Arabization and Islamization against the French language which was still dominant in higher education and the professions. It recruited Egyptians to Arabize and de-Frenchify the school system, including a substantial number of Muslim Brotherhood members. Many of the generation of "strictly Arabphone teachers" trained by the Brothers adopted the beliefs of their teachers and went on to form the basis of an "Islamist intelligentsia" that made up the FIS (Ali Belhadj being a prime example).

In the 1980s the government imported two renowned Islamic scholars, Mohammed al-Ghazali and Yusuf al-Qaradawi, to "strengthen the religious dimension" of the ruling National Liberation Front (FLN) party's "nationalist ideology". However, both clerics were "fellow travelers" of the Muslim Brotherhood, supporters of Saudi Arabia and the other Gulf monarchies, and supported "Islamic awakening" in Algeria, giving only "lip service" to the government.

Another Islamist, Mustafa Bouyali, a "gifted inflammatory preacher" and veteran of the Algerian independence struggle, called for the application of the sharia and creating of an Islamic state by jihad. After persecution by the security services he founded the Mouvement Islamique Arme (MIA), "a loose association of tiny groups", with himself as amir in 1982. His group carried out a series of "bold attacks" against the regime and was able to carry it fight on underground for five years before Bouyali was killed in February 1987.

Also in the 1980s, several hundred youth left Algeria for camps of Peshawar to fight jihad in Afghanistan. As Algeria was a close ally of the jihadists' enemy the Soviet Union, these jihadists tended to consider the Afghan jihad a "prelude" to jihad against the Algerian FLN. After the Marxist government in Afghanistan fell, many of the Salafist jihadis returned to Algeria and supported the FIS and later the GIA.

Also adding to the strength of salafist "Islamic revivalism" and political Islam in Algeria was the weakness (or nonexistence) of any alternative in the form of popular Muslim brotherhoods which had been dismantled by the FLN government in retaliation for lack of support and whose land had been confiscated and redistributed by the FLN government after independence.

During and after the 1988 October Riots, Islamists "set about building bridges to the young urban poor". The riots "petered out" after meetings between the President Chadli and Islamists Ali Belhadj and members of the Muslim Brotherhood.

=== Founding ===
On 3 November 1988, the Algerian Constitution was amended to allow parties other than the ruling FLN to operate legally. The FIS was born shortly afterwards in Algiers on 18 February 1989, led by an elderly sheikh, Abbassi Madani, and a charismatic young mosque preacher, Ali Belhadj. Its views ranged across a wide (but not complete) spectrum of Islamist opinion, exemplified by its two leaders. Abbassi Madani, a professor at University of Algiers and ex-independence fighter, represented a relatively moderate religious conservatism and symbolically connected the party to the Algerian War of Independence, the traditionally emphasized source of the ruling FLN's legitimacy. His aim was to "Islamise the regime without altering society's basic fabric." The party came into legal existence on 16 September 1989.

Ali Belhadj, a high school teacher, appealed to a younger and less educated class. An impassioned orator, he was known for his ability to both enrage and calm at will the tens of thousands of young hittiestes who came to hear him speak. However, his radical speeches alarmed non-Islamists and feminists. He purportedly represented a Salafi mindset. Madani sometimes expressed support for multiparty democracy, whereas Belhadj denounced it as a potential threat to sharia. Their support of free market trading and opposition to the ruling elite also attracted middle class traders, who felt left out of the economy.

As in other Muslim countries where the political system allowed opposition and free elections for the first time, the FIS benefited from being a religious party. Unlike the secular parties it had "a coherent network of preachers already in place." Its support base increased rapidly with the help of activists preaching in friendly mosques.

=== 1990 local elections victory ===
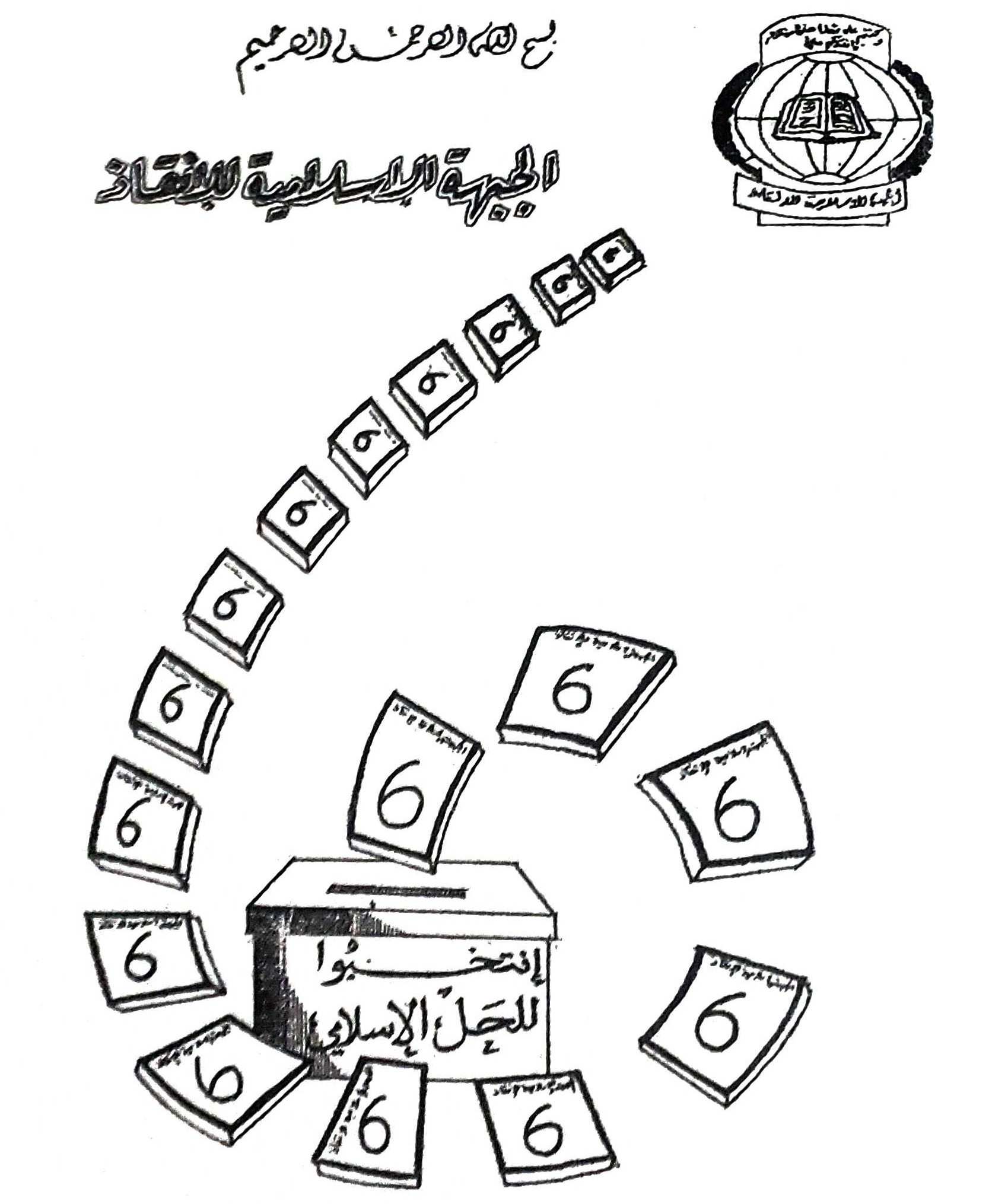
FIS Tract distributed during the 1990 local elections encouraging voters to vote for the "Islamic Solution".

The FIS made "spectacular" progress in the first year of its existence. The first edition of its weekly publication, Al Munqidh, was distributed to 200,000. The FIS-inspired doctors, nurses and rescue teams showed "devotion and effectiveness" helping victims of an earthquake in Tipaza Province. It organized marches and rallies and "applied steady pressure on the state" to force a promise of early elections.

In the first free elections since independence on 12 June 1990, they swept the local elections with 54% of votes cast, almost double that of the FLN and far more than any of the other parties. The FIS took 46% of town assemblies and 55% of wilaya assemblies. Its supporters were especially concentrated in urban areas: it secured 93% of towns/cities of over 50,000. This was the "high point" of FIS influence. Its rapid rise alarmed the government, which moved to curtail the powers of local government.

Once in power in local governments, its administration and its Islamic charity was praised by many as just, equitable, orderly and virtuous, in contrast to its corrupt, wasteful, arbitrary and inefficient FLN predecessors.

The victory in local elections was the "high point" of FIS influence, which benefited from widespread disillusionment with the Algerian ruling party. As time went on non-core supporters began to become disenchanted. The secular, educated, salaried urban middle class began to be concerned over the anti-French language policy.

The Gulf War energized the party, but brought fissures. The FIS had condemned Saddam Hussein's invasion of Kuwait, but once it was apparent that Western intervention was inevitable, public opinion shifted and there were massive demonstrations, blood donation drives. When Benhadj delivered a speech in front of the Ministry of Defense building demanding a corp be sent to fight in Iraq's favor, the military took it as a "direct affront" and challenge to the discipline in the armed forces. (Benhadj later appealed unsuccessfully to the armed forces rank and file for a general mutiny.) Furthermore, his co-leader Madani had received much aid from Iraq's direct enemies, Saudi Arabia and other oil monarchies, supported them and was unhappy about having to defer to Benhadj and the pro-Sadam position.

=== General strike and arrests of leadership ===
In May 1991, the FIS called for a general strike to protest the government's redrawing of electoral districts, which it saw as gerrymandering directed against it. The strike itself was a failure, but the demonstrations FIS organized in Algiers were huge. Mass sit-ins were held in one of Algiers largest squares for a week, and the FIS succeeded in pressuring the government. It was persuaded in June to call the strike off by the promise of fair parliamentary elections.

However, disagreements on the strike provoked open dissension among the FIS leadership (the Madjliss ech-Choura), and the prolonged demonstrations alarmed the military. Shortly afterwards the government arrested Madani and Belhadj on 30 June 1991, having already arrested a number of lower-ranking members. The party, however, remained legal in the meantime, and passed to the effective leadership of "djazarists" led by Abdelkader Hachani after four days of contested leadership by Mohamed Said (who was then arrested).

Despite activists anger that its demands for the leaders' release went unheeded, after some deliberation (and expulsion of dissenters such as Said Mekhloufi and Kamareddine Kherbane who advocated direct action against the government), the FIS agreed to participate in the next elections. On 26 December 1991, the FIS won the first round of parliamentary elections, although with one million fewer votes than in the earlier local elections. It won 48% of the overall popular vote, and 188 of the 231 seats contested in that round, putting them far ahead of rivals.

The army saw the seeming certainty of resulting FIS rule as unacceptable. On 11 January 1992, it cancelled the electoral process, forcing President Chadli Bendjedid to resign and bringing in the exiled independence fighter Mohammed Boudiaf to serve as a new president. Many FIS members were arrested, including FIS number three leader Abdelkader Hachani on 22 January. A state of emergency was declared on 9 February, and the government officially dissolved FIS on 4 March. On 12 July, Abbassi Madani and Ali Belhadj were sentenced to 12 years in prison.

40,000 FIS militants and elected FIS officials were interned in tents deep in the Sahara. Mosques were placed under "tight surveillance". Such activists as remained at large took this as a declaration of war, though FIS would not officially call for armed resistance until 1993, attempting to steer a nuanced course of expressing sympathy for the guerrillas without endorsing their actions.

=== Civil war ===
Many took to the hills and joined guerrilla groups. The country inexorably slid into a civil war which would claim more than 250,000 lives, from which it only began to emerge at the end of the 1990s. Initially, the guerrillas were led by members of non-FIS groups, such as Mustafa Bouyali's supporters and people who had fought in Afghanistan, although FIS itself established an underground network, led by Mohamed Said and Abderrezak Redjam, setting up clandestine newspapers and even a radio station with close links to the MIA. From late 1992, they also began issuing official statements from abroad, led by Rabah Kebir and Anwar Haddam.

Soon after taking office in 1994, Liamine Zeroual began negotiations with the imprisoned FIS leadership, releasing some prisoners (including such figures as Ali Djeddi and Abdelkader Boukhamkham) by way of encouragement. These first negotiations collapsed in March, as each accused the other of reneging on agreements; but further, initially secret, negotiations would take place over the following months.

==== Founding of the Islamic Salvation Army ====
As the radical Armed Islamic Group (Groupe Islamique Armé or GIA), hostile to FIS as well as to the government, rose to the forefront, FIS-loyalist guerrillas, threatened with marginalization, attempted to unite their forces. In July 1994, the MIA, together with the remainder of the MEI and a variety of smaller groups, united as the Islamic Salvation Army (or AIS, a term that had previously sometimes been used as a general label for pro-FIS guerrillas), declaring their allegiance to FIS and thus strengthening FIS' hand for the negotiations. It was initially headed by MIA's Abdelkader Chebouti, who was superseded in November 1994 by MEI's Madani Mezrag.

It rejected all truces and compromises with the government. The AIS favored a long-term jihad directed against the state and its representatives, not civilians. The GIA appealed to the hittistes urban youth, while the AIS support came from the pious middle class.

By the end of 1994, the Islamic Salvation Army (AIS) controlled over half the guerrillas of the east and west, but barely 20% in the center, near the capital, where the GIA were mainly based. Their main leadership was based in the Beni Khettab mountains near Jijel. It issued communiqués condemning the GIA's indiscriminate targeting of women, journalists, and other civilians "not involved in the repression", and attacking its school arson campaign.

Meanwhile, following letters from Madani and Belhadj expressing a commitment to pluralistic democracy and proposing possible solutions to the crisis, the government released both from jail to house arrest on 13 September. However, no let up was observed in the fighting, and the government was unwilling to allow them to consult with FIS figures that remained in prison; the negotiations soon foundered, and at the end of October the government announced the failure of the second round of negotiations, and published incriminating letters from Belhadj that were allegedly found on the body of GIA leader Cherif Gousmi, who had been killed on 26 September.

=== Work in exile ===
A few FIS leaders, notably Rabah Kebir, had escaped into exile abroad. During 1994, they carried out negotiations in Italy with other political parties, notably the FLN and FFS, and came out with a mutual agreement on 14 January 1995: the Sant'Egidio platform. This set forth a set of principles: respect for human rights and multiparty democracy, rejection of army rule and dictatorship, recognition of Islam, Arabness, and Berberness as essential aspects of Algerianness, demand for the release of FIS leaders, and an end to extrajudicial killing and torture on all sides. To the surprise of many, even Ali Belhadj endorsed the agreement. However, a crucial signatory was missing: the government itself. As a result, the platform had little if any effect.

Despite the government's extremely hostile reaction to the Rome Platform, though, a third attempt at negotiations took place, starting in April with a letter from Madani condemning acts of violence, and hopes were raised. However, the FIS did not offer enough concessions to satisfy the government, demanding, as usual, that FIS leaders should be released before FIS could call for a ceasefire. In July Zeroual announced that the talks had failed, for the last time.

In 1995, the GIA turned on the AIS in earnest. Reports of battles between the AIS and GIA increased (resulting in an estimated 60 deaths in March 1995 alone), and the GIA reiterated its death threats against FIS and AIS leaders, claiming to be the "sole prosecutor of jihad" and angered by their negotiation attempts. On July 11 Abdelbaki Sahraoui, a co-founder of FIS, was assassinated in Paris; the GIA said that they were responsible, although there was no evidence supporting this. On November 22, 1995, the FIS asked to meet with President Zeroual in order to disband the cycle of violence that was occurring in Algeria

=== Declaration of ceasefire ===
The AIS, faced with attacks from both sides and wanting to dissociate itself from the GIA's civilian massacres, declared a unilateral ceasefire on 21 September 1997 (in order to "unveil the enemy who hides behind these abominable massacres"), and disbanded in 1999. Thousands of AIS fighters surrendered and handed over their weapons to the authorities. In January 2000 those fighters obtained amnesty under the terms of the "Civil Concord" decreed by President Abdelaziz Bouteflika after his election in April 1999. Both Mezrag and Benaïcha offered their services to the authorities to fight the GIA and the Salafist Group for Preaching and Combat (GSPC), which has links to Al-Qaeda.

On 2 July 2003, Belhadj and Madani were released (the former had been in jail, the latter had been moved to house arrest in 1997). Foreign media were banned from covering the event locally, and FIS itself remains banned. However, their release has had little apparent impact. After a decade of vicious civil conflict, there was little enthusiasm in Algeria for reopening old wounds.

As the civil war jihad impoverished the pious middle class, the AIS lost support to the "moderate" Islamic parties, especially the Hamas party of Mahfoud Nahnah.

== See also ==
- List of Islamic political parties
- Charter for Peace and National Reconciliation
- Integrism
