= 1995 Paris RER bombing =

Terrorist bombing in Paris, France

Paris RER bombing
- Paramedics responding to the bombing
- Location: 48°51′13″N 2°20′39″E; Saint-Michel–Notre-Dame station, Paris, France
- Date: 25 July 1995; 5:00 PM (UTC+1)
- Attack type: Bombing
- Weapon: Improvised explosive device
- Deaths: 8
- Injuries: 117
- Perpetrators: Armed Islamic Group of Algeria; Khaled Kelkal; Boualem Bensaïd
- No. of participants: 2
- Motive: Islamic terrorism

The Paris RER bombing took place on 25 July 1995, when an improvised explosive device was detonated inside of a railcar on line B of the Réseau Express Régional. Eight were killed and 117 more were injured. The Armed Islamic Group of Algeria claimed responsibility for the attacks, which were one of several attacks that took place across France in 1995.

== Attack ==
On 25 July 1995 at 5 PM (UTC+1), a bomb placed in the sixth car of a train on the RER B by the Armed Islamic Group of Algeria (GIA) in response to France's support of the Algerian government during the Algerian civil war with the GIA. The bomb on the line exploded while it was in the second basement of the station, near the Saint-Michel - Notre-Dame platforms. When the bomb exploded, multiple people were instantly killed, while several others were seriously injured. Evacuations of the seriously injured began at 5:40 PM. Place Saint-Michel, the bridges and the surrounding streets were full of emergency vehicles responding to the attack. The Notre-Dame square served as a helicopter pad while breweries were requisitioned as advanced aid stations. Eight people were confirmed dead in the following days, with 25 seriously injured and more than 150 injured to varying, non-severe degrees.

== Aftermath ==
=== Investigation ===
In the absence of a claim, the Minister of the Interior Jean-Louis Debré launched a call for witnesses and promised FR 1,000,000 to anyone who would identify the terrorists. The improvised bomb was determined to be composed of a camping gas canister filled with black powder, weed killer and shrapnel (nails, bolts) with a self-timer alarm, the same type of material that was used by the Armed Islamic Group. The “poor man’s bomb” was buried under a seat in the sixth car of the train.

Six days later, on 31 July 1995, the Department of Intelligence and Security (DRS), the Algerian intelligence service, indicated to its French counterpart, the Directorate of Territorial Surveillance (DST), that groups of the GIA were present in France and intended to commit attacks. For a time, French authorities suspected that these groups were remotely controlled by the DRS to provoke an anti-Islamist reaction. On 17 August 1995, a similar bomb placed in a trash can exploded and injured 17 people, three of whom were in serious condition. On 19 August a text was sent to Jacques Chirac through the French ambassador in Algiers who received a letter that was signed Abu Abderahmane Amine, the emir of the Armed Islamic Group. He asked Chirac to “convert to Islam and reconsider his positions on the Algerian issue”.

Two of the bombers were identified through to fingerprints left on a gas cylinder which did not explode on 26 August 1995 alongside a Lyon-Paris TGV railway line, near Cailloux-sur-Fontaines. Khaled Kelkal and Boualem Bensaïd were both identified and named. Despite the intensive tracking of Khaled Kelkal, an attempted attack and two bomb attacks were still committed in Paris during the beginning of September.

=== Perpetrators ===
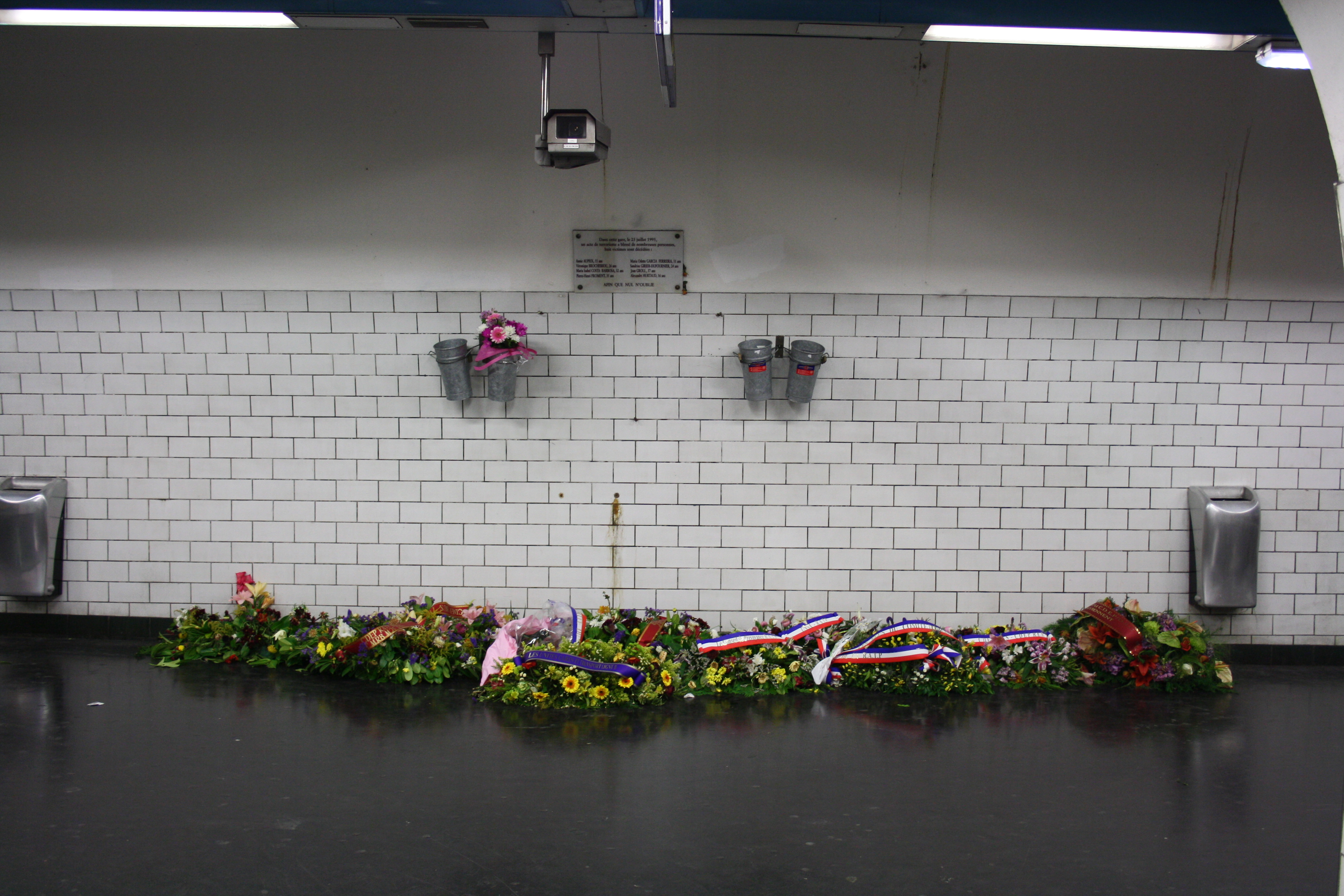
The memorial to the victims, located at the Saint-Michel station

Around 170,000 photographs of Kelkal were posted up in Paris after his identification. After numerous false leads, he was spotted in the Lyon region where he was shot dead by members of the Parachute Intervention Squadron of the National Gendarmerie (EPIGN) on 29 September 1995. Due to a telephone number retrieved from one of the pockets of Kelkal, the police also arrested Karim Koussa, Boualem Bensaïd and Smaïn Aït Ali Belkacem who were tried and sentenced, for their involvement in the attacks, to life imprisonment on 30 October 2002. Ali Touchent, the "mastermind", was killed in Algeria in 1997; Rachid Ramda, the “financier”, was arrested in England in November 1995 but French authorities waited ten years for his extradition which was set forward on 14 October 2005. He was extradited on 1 December 2005. Tried for his involvement in three attacks committed in 1995 in Paris, Ramda was sentenced to life imprisonment on 26 October 2007.

=== Memorials ===
The commemorative plaque on the RER B platform is decorated with flowers every year on the anniversary of the attack. On 25 July 2005, ten years after the events, a tribute was paid by Françoise Rudetzki, general delegate of the SOS Attentats Association in front of the plaque. A minute of silence was observed, and a wreath of flowers was laid on behalf of the Paris Transport Authority (RATP), in the presence of its president, Anne-Marie Idrac.

== Controversies ==
Several members of the Parisian public quickly expressed their concerns about the trash cans present in public spaces and which would make it possible to carry out another similarly-planned attack using the same modus operandi. Around 300 bins were removed or blocked by the public authorities in busy areas to prevent this.

== See also ==
- Rue de Rennes bombing, a similar attack in Paris in 1986
