= Maud Marin =

French lawyer and author

- Born: Jean Pascal Henri Planchard; 28 June 1945; Rouen, Normandy, France
- Died: 21 June 2025 (aged 79); Cahors, France
- Other name: Maud Planchard
- Education: Sorbonne University (law, political science)
- Occupations: Lawyer, author
- Known for: First known transsexual lawyer

Maud Marin (French pronunciation: [mod maʀɛ̃]) or Maud Planchard (28 June 1945 – 21 June 2025) was a French lawyer and author, and the world's first known transsexual lawyer.

== Early life ==
Marin was born Jean Pascal Henri Planchard on June 28, 1945 at Rouen in Normandy and assigned male at birth.

She studied law and political science at the Sorbonne. In 1968, when she told her parents that she intended to transition, they threw her out. To survive, Marin turned to prostitution, first in Paris in the Bois de Boulogne, then later in London. She changed her name from Jean Planchard to Maud Marin in May 1968. In 1974, when she was 29, Marin underwent vaginoplasty. She was recognised by the state as a transsexual. However, she still had to prostitute herself, under the aegis of the gang Zemour Brothers.

== Career ==
Marin also worked, for a time, at PT&T, the French government agency responsible for postal and telecom services, as a trainee postal inspector.

With the support of the Minister for Social Affairs and Health, Simone Veil, Marin was able to get a certificate of aptitude for the legal profession. As a result, Marin became the world's first transsexual lawyer in 1980. She practised at the Paris Bar from 1981 to 1985, when she was disbarred for "conspicuous difference". In her early practice, she helped other French prostitutes.

In the late 1980s, Marin published two autobiographical books. The first book, Angel's Leap (Le Saut de l'ange) (1987), dealt with her transsexual identity, the second, Sad Pleasures (Tristes Plaisirs (1989), her experience of prostitution. The books brought her notoriety and shocked her colleagues at the Paris Bar. As a result, Marin found it difficult to obtain a position in chambers.

Instead, Marin practised at the Seine-Saint-Denis Bar in Bobigny for several years under the name Maud Planchard, in a circuit that saw a high volume of violent crime cases. In 1991, Marin published the book The Quarter of the Damned (Le Quartier des Maudites) about female prisons.

In 1996, Marin published a new book, Have Pity on Victims (Pitié pour les victimes), in which she criticised the justice system for being more concerned with pursuing delinquents than with victim suffering. In the book, she also discussed the 1995 terrorist Paris RER station bombing, in which she alleged that the bomb was created in Seine-Saint-Denis and not in Algeria, as the police were claiming. Marin's book was labelled "dangerous" by the government and resulted in Marin being disbarred in 1999.

Jean-Marie Le Pen, her editor and the head of the French National Front, tried to help Marin get re-admitted to the bar. However, party lawyer Wallerand de Saint-Just, who considered the National Front to be defenders of family values, refused to support him.

== Later life ==
In 2002, Marin was forced, for financial reasons, to leave Paris. She moved to her mother's house in Cahors. In 2006, she was forced to seek food assistance from the charity Restaurants du Cœur.

Marin attempted to become a magistrate on the basis that she was over fifty and had at least 15 years of experience in the judicial or administrative domain. However, her request to take the entrance exam was rejected by the Minister for Justice, who refused to recognise her work experience at PT&T under her dead name. Marin appealed to the Administrative Tribunal in Paris, but the judge also refused to recognise any experience under the name of Jean Planchard.

Marin lived the remainder of her life in the French countryside, in Lot, "with her books and her memories".

== Death ==
Maud Marin died in June 2025 and was buried in Cahors.

== Critical reception ==
Isabelle Boisclair, a professor of literary and cultural studies at the University of Sherbrooke, considered Marin's autobiography Angel's Leap (Le Saut de l'ange) as one of several useful texts on intersexuality. Of the book, Boisclair wrote, "From a political standpoint, this text is part of an affirmative action movement, and as such, it holds undeniable importance for the intersex community".

Of her book in The Quarter of the Damned (Le Quartier des Maudites), Le Nouvel Obs wrote, "she gives voice to women in prison in a raw, humorous, and warm language. The language of the damned with tender hearts."

== Works ==
- Marin, Maud; Cuny, Marie-Thérèse (1987). Le Saut de l'ange. Paris: Fixot. ISBN 978-2738203663. BNF: 34967760.
- Maud Marin; Marie-Thérèse Cuny (1989). Tristes plaisirs. Paris: Fixot. ISBN 2-87645-048-8. BNF: 36635058.
- Maud Marin; Marie-Thérèse Cuny (1991). Le Quartier des maudites. Document. Paris: Fixot. ISBN 978-2876450998. BNF: 35479605.
- Maud Marin; Philippe Delannoy (1996). Pitié pour les victimes: document. Paris: Fixot. ISBN 2-87645-278-2. BNF: 36689794.
- Maud Marin (1999). Un procès en banlieue. Saint-Brieuc: Les Presses bretonnes. ISBN 2-85615-011-X. BNF: 37083200.
- Maud Marin (2001). Que messieurs les assassins commencent !. Paris: Objectif France. ISBN 2-913744-08-7. BNF: 37706099.
