= Rachid Ramda =

- Born: September 29, 1969 (age 57); El Ogla, Algeria
- Criminal charges: Complicity of assassination in relation with a terrorist enterprise
- Penalty: Life imprisonment

Rachid Ramda (born September 29, 1969, El Ogla, also known as "Abou Farès") is an Algerian man convicted of the 1995 bombings against French public transportation systems. He has denied his involvement.

== Algeria ==
Rachid Ramda was born in El Ogla on 29 September 1969, in the east of Algeria. He is from a Berber Chaouia family, although Arabic is his native language. All the members of his family are well educated: one of his brothers is an architect-engineer, another a computer scientist. Ramda studied architecture at the Institut Polytechnique. He became a supporter of the Islamic Salvation Front (FIS) when it was founded in 1988; his literature teacher was a co-founder of the FIS. According to his own statements, he left Algeria in 1989 for Pakistan, thus before the cancellation of the elections which set the stage for the Algerian Civil War, and before the formation of the Armed Islamic Group of Algeria (GIA). In Pakistan, he entered into contact with Muslim humanitarian NGOs and other NGOs (including Doctors Without Borders) assisting Afghan refugees. He then abandoned his architectural training. He went to London, where he wrote articles for the El Ansar newspaper. Ramda has denied the allegations of French justice that El Ansar was the official mouthpiece of the GIA.

In 1993, Ramda was sentenced to death in Algeria in absentia for a 1992 terrorist attack at the airport of Algiers, which killed nine people and wounded 123.

== Extradition ==
Ramda was granted refugee status in the United Kingdom. After the 1995 bombings in France, he was arrested in London on 4 November 1995, accused by French prosecutors of having funded the bombings and of being their mastermind. Ramda has denied the funding role, citing a report from the Scotland Yard inspector John MacMillan of 23 November 1995, which stated that "no bank accounts have been identified which could be associated with Ramda, or the other possible names used." He did, however, admit that his fingerprints had been found on a Western Union money order of 38,000 francs sent to the bomber Ait Ali Belkacem. Ramda claimed that he did not know Ait Ali Belkacem; he has also denied knowing the other bomber, Boualem Bensaid. Ramda was detained in the HSSU high-security unit of Belmarsh prison in London, which he has compared to Guantanamo.

France requested the extradition of Ramda from the United Kingdom; Ramda successfully fought extradition until 2005. The refusal of British authorities to extradite Ramda was a point of contention between France and the UK, with many in France and elsewhere alleging that the British government was deliberately lenient to Islamist terrorists operating outside of the UK in order to buy peace in the UK (the alleged "Londonistan" policy). In fact, British ministers repeatedly tried to extradite Ramda, but had their decisions overturned by the British High Court. The July 2005 London bombings changed sentiment and paved the way for Ramda's extradition in December 2005.

== Trial in France ==
After exhausting all his appeals, Ramda was handed over to French custody on 1 December 2005. Transferred to the Palais de Justice of Paris, he was formally informed of four indictments laid against him by the French justice: one for criminal association with a terrorist organisation (specifically for providing funding to the GIA, and three in relation to three terrorist attacks in Paris in 1995. The former, being a "délit", i.e. a crime of intermediate seriousness, would be tried in the Tribunal Correctionnel; and the latter three, considered felonies (that is, carrying a possible sentence of more than 10 years) in the Cour d'assises.

On 29 March 2006 Ramda was convicted of criminal association with a terrorist organisation and sentenced to ten years in prison by the Tribunal Correctionel, the maximum possible sentence. He had refused to co-operate in his own defense. This sentence was confirmed by the Appeal Court in December 2006.

In an October 2007 interview with Libération, Ramda rejected accusations that he was a mastermind of the Algerian radical Islamist movement and a prominent figure of the GIA.

The prosecution has showed his fingerprints were on a Western Union money order of 38,000 francs sent to the bomber Ait Ali Belkacem. Ramda claims that he did not know Belkacem, although he admits that it was his fingerprints on the money order. He claims that the prosecution has given a false interpretation of this evidence. Further evidence submitted by the prosecution concerns wiretaps of phone communications between Ramda and the bombers in France, a short time before and after the bombings. According to Ramda, he has not been allowed to listen to these wiretaps, and he doubts they exist. He denied having phoned the bombers and knowing them.

Ramda stated that detention conditions in France were similar to Belmarsh, and that he was badly treated by French police. He declared that he thought, at first, that this was specific to terror suspects, but now he believes that all detainees are treated this way.

Another trial against him began in October 2007 before the Cour d'assises. The bombers Bensaïd and Belkacem were both given life sentences in 2002, but Ramda's case had been severed from theirs. He was charged of "complicity of assassination in relation with a terrorist enterprise". He was convicted in this trial on 26 October 2007, and given a life sentence, with the requirement that he serve at least twenty-two years.
