= El Ogla =

El Ogla may refer to:

- El Ogla, Tébessa, a town in Tébessa Province, Algeria
- El Ogla, El Oued, a town in El Oued Province, Algeria
