= Jean-François Ricard =

French magistrate

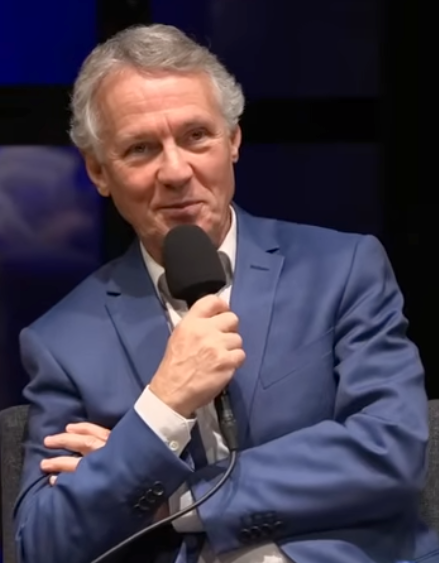
- In a 2025 interview
- Born: 14 July 1956 (age 69); Boulogne-Billancourt, France
- Title: Head of the French National Terrorism Prosecution Office (Parquet National Anti-Terroriste; PNAT)

Jean-François Ricard (born 14 July 1956) is a French magistrate, and since 25 June 2019 the first prosecutor of the National Terrorism Prosecution Office (Parquet national antiterroriste; PNAT) a parquet for the prosecution of terrorism in France.

== Early life and education ==
Ricard was born in Boulogne-Billancourt (Hauts-de-Seine), France.

== Career ==
Ricard began his career in December 1982 as a judge in Arras (Pas-de-Calais). He then was a judge in Bobigny (Seine-Saint-Denis), beginning in December 1986, before joining the judiciary in Paris.

Ricard worked as an investigating judge in charge of terrorism cases for 12 years. With Jean-Louis Bruguière, Ricard was in charge of the file of the 1996 Paris RER bombing on the Réseau Express Régional in Saint-Michel. Ricard left his role as an investigating judge in 2006.

From 2006 to 2008 Ricard was seconded to the Ministry of Armed Forces, where he led a team as head of the military criminal affairs division.

Between 2009 and 2015, he was general counsel at the Court of Appeal of Paris. Ricard requested the trial of the terrorist Carlos the Jackal in 2013.

Beginning in 2015, Ricard was adviser to the criminal chamber of the French Court of Cassation.

=== French National Terrorism Prosecution Office ===
Ricard advocated for the creation of a French national anti-terrorism prosecution along with Magistrate Jean-Louis Bruguière, Michel Debacq (former head of the specialized section of the Paris prosecutor's office), and Christian Vigouroux (former chief of staff of Christiane Taubira and Élisabeth Guigou).

After the receipt of the opinion of France's Superior Council of the Judiciary (Conseil supérieur de la magistrature; CSM) at its meeting of 21 May 2019, the 62-year-old Ricard was appointed General Counsel at the Court of Cassation to exercise the function of anti-terrorism public prosecutor at the Tribunal de grande instance de Paris, heading a new National Terrorism Prosecution Office (Parquet national antiterroriste; PNAT), beginning on 25 June 2019. He leads a team of 25 magistrates. His reputation among his colleagues was that he is uncompromising and perfectionist. Magistrate Jean-Louis Bruguière said: "He is a very good magistrate with [a] good understanding on major cases of radical Islamism. A hard worker and very meticulous, he knew the files by heart."

During his time in office, Ricard led investigations into a stabbing attack near the former offices of the magazine Charlie Hebdo in September 2020, the murder of Samuel Paty in October 2020, the 2020 Nice stabbing later that month, and the Rambouillet knife attack in April 2021.

Shortly after the 2022 Russian invasion of Ukraine, Ricard opened three inquiries over possible war crimes in the Ukrainian towns of Mariupol, Hostomel and Chernihiv, all related to acts against French citizens in the country.
