= Court of Cassation (France) =

Highest judicial court in France

Coordinates: 48°51′24″N 2°20′39″E

Court of Cassation of France
- Cour de Cassation
- Logo

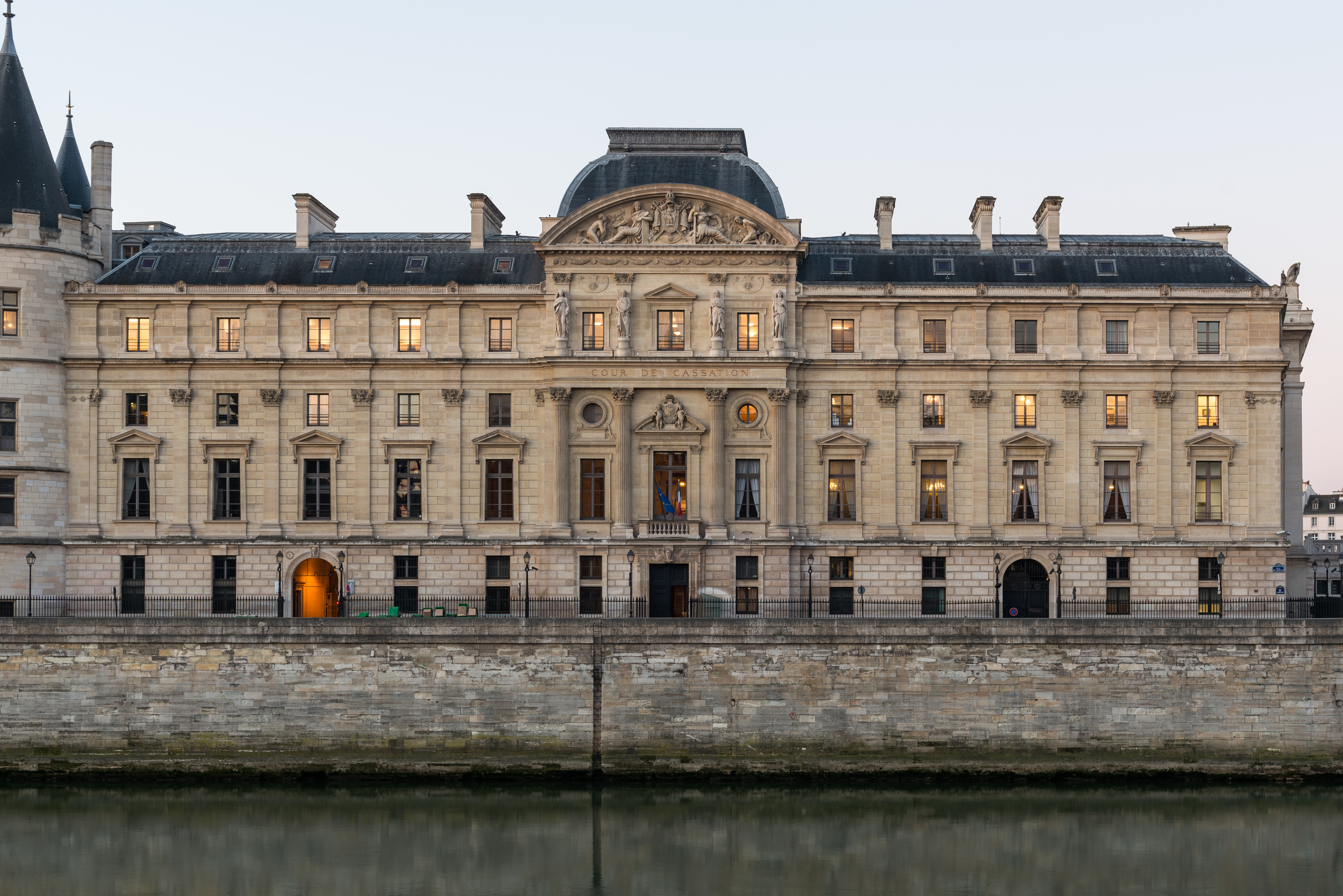
- The Court of Cassation building on the Île de la Cité in Paris seen from the Seine
- Interactive map of Court of Cassation of France
- Established: 1791; 235 years ago
- Jurisdiction: France
- Location: Paris
- Authorised by: Constitution of France
- Appeals to: Constitutional Council
- Website: www.courdecassation.fr

President of the Court of Cassation
- Currently: Christophe Soulard
- Since: January 7, 2022; 4 years ago

The Court of Cassation (French: Cour de cassation, [kuʁ d(ə) kasɑsjɔ̃]) is the supreme court for civil and criminal cases in France. It is France's highest court, and one of the country's four superior courts, along with the Council of State, the Constitutional Council and the Jurisdictional Disputes Tribunal.

It primarily hears appeals against the decisions of courts of assizes and courts of appeal (appeals-in-cassation). The Court only reviews questions of law (but not questions of fact) and bears ultimate responsibility for a uniform interpretation and application of statutory law throughout France. It also filters out appeals challenging the constitutionality of statutes before forwarding them to the Constitutional Council, reviews lower court verdicts on request of the European Court of Human Rights and hears several other types of cases.

The Court is organized into three civil chambers, a commerce chamber, a labour chamber, a criminal chamber, a prosecutorial service and various other bodies. The Court usually rules in panels of three or five judges; the most significant cases are adjudicated by plenary sessions.

The Court was established in 1790 as the Tribunal of Cassation during the French Revolution; its original purpose was to act as a court of error with revisory jurisdiction over lower provincial prerogative courts (parlements). However, much about the Court continues the earlier Paris Parlement. Several other countries have courts of cassation based on the French model.

The Court is located in the Palace of Justice in the 1st arrondissement of Paris.

== Composition ==
Schema showing the Court of Cassation sitting atop the judiciary branch.

The Court is made up of justices, the Public prosecutor's office, and an Administrative Office of Courts. In addition, a separate bar of specially certified barristers exists for trying cases at the French Court.

=== Judges and divisions ===
Overall, the Court consists of nearly 85 trial judges (conseillers) and about 40 deputy judges (Note: A Canadian term; known as an associate judge in Australia and a magistrate judge in America.) (conseillers référendaires), each divided among six different divisions (chambres):

- First Civil Division (première chambre civile) deals with contractual liability, international private law, arbitration, consumer law, family law, successions (wills), child custody, professional discipline, individual rights
- Second Civil Division (deuxième chambre civile) handles civil procedural issues, torts, insurance law, social insurance law and electoral matters
- Third Civil Division (troisième chambre civile) (or "Land Court") for immovable property (real estate), housing, commercial leases, construction law, urban planning law, environmental law
- Commercial Division (chambre commerciale, financière et économique) handles corporate law, bankruptcy, commercial law, business contracts, competition law, financial law and intellectual property rights
- Labor Division (chambre sociale) handles labor disputes, worker compensation.
- Criminal Division (chambre criminelle) deals with criminal cases and criminal procedural rules

Each division is headed by a presiding justice (Note: A presiding judge may be the judge trying the case or the senior-most justice on a Bench. In Canada, this position is referred to as "senior judge". In most English-speaking countries, "presiding justice" refers to any high-level judge. In the United States, it refers to a semi-retired, elderly judge. In France this is the highest-ranking judge in the division) referred to in French as a président, or President of Division. The Chief Justice bears the title of the premier président, or President of the Court, who supervises the presiding justices of the various divisions. The Chief Justice is the highest-ranking judicial officer in the country and is responsible for administration of the Court and the discipline of justices. The current Chief Justice is Christophe Soulard. The Court also includes 12 masters (auditeurs), the lowest rank of justice, who are primarily concerned with administration.

There is, in addition to the abovementioned six divisions, a separate organization known as the Divisional Court (chambre mixte). The Divisional Court adjudicates where the subject matter of an appeal falls within the purview of multiple divisions. The Bench of the Divisional Court seats the Chief Justice and a number of other judges from at least three other divisions relevant to a given case. Any participating division is represented by its Presiding Justice and two puisne judges.

Finally, a full court (Assemblée plénière) is called, presided over by the Chief Justice or, if he is absent, by the most senior presiding justice. It also seats all divisional presiding justices and senior justices, assisted by a puisne judge from each division. The full court is the highest level of the Court.

=== Office of the Prosecutor ===
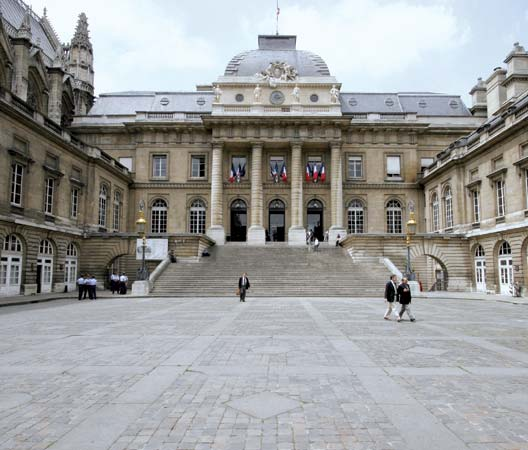
The building of the Court of Cassation

The prosecution, or parquet général, is headed by the Chief Prosecutor (procureur général). (Note: Not completely analogous to a prosecutor in common law jurisdictions, as investigations in France are carried out by the juge d'instruction (magistrate judge) in cooperation with police. Both work with the prosecutor, who is in charge of presenting the state's case against a defendant.) The Chief Prosecutor is a judicial officer, but does not prosecute cases; instead, his function is to advise the Court on how to proceed, analogous to the Commissioner-in-Council's (Note: appears to be a Canadian advisor to the Governor-General, in Canada, i.e., a common law jurisdiction, so the analogy should possibly be taken with a grain of salt) role within the Conseil d'État (lit. Council of State, but function may vary). Duties include filing motions to bring cases before the Court "in the name of the law" and bringing cases before the French Court of Justice (Cour de justice de la République), which tries government officials for crimes committed while in office. The Chief Prosecutor is assisted by two Chief Deputy Prosecutors (premiers avocats généraux) and a staff of about 22 deputy prosecutors (avocats généraux), and two assistant prosecutors (substituts).

=== Supreme Court bar ===
Barristers (avocats), though not technically officers of the court, play an integral role in the justice system. Except for a few types of actions, advocate counsel in the form of a barrister is mandatory for any case heard at the Court or Council of State. Barristers with exclusive rights of audience and admitted to practice law in either senior court are titled avocat au Conseil d'État et à la Cour de Cassation, or avocats aux Conseils ("Counsel at Senior Court") for short. Admission to the Supreme Court bar (Note: For more (in French): www.ordre-avocats-cassation.fr.) is particularly difficult, requiring special training and passing a notoriously stringent examination. Once admitted, bar members can advise litigants on whether their actions are justiciable, that is, issuable and exceeding de minimis requirements—an important service since the court hears appeals only on points of law and not issues of fact. Membership is restricted to 60 total positions and is considered a public office.

=== General counsel ===
In May 2019, Jean-François Ricard was appointed General Counsel at the Court of Cassation to exercise the function of anti-terrorism public prosecutor at the Tribunal de grande instance de Paris, heading a new National Terrorism Prosecution Office (Parquet national antiterroriste; PNAT), beginning on 25 June 2019. He leads a team of 25 magistrates.

== Proceedings ==
The Court's main purpose is to review lower court rulings on the grounds of legal or procedural error. As the highest court of law in France, it also has other duties.

=== Appeals ===
The Court has inherent appellate jurisdiction for appeals (called pourvois en cassation) from courts of appeal or, for certain types of small claims cases not appealable to appellate courts, from courts of record. The Supreme Court reviews the appeal on the record and may affirm or set aside lower court rulings; if set aside, the ruling is said to be cassé (French for "quashed"), hence the French name of Cour de cassation, or "Quashing Court". The Court adjudicates by strict appeal, or appeal stricto sensu, which is limited to review of the decision and of the decision-making process on a point of law, and may only allow the appeal in cases of serious error; fresh evidence is not admissible. The typical outcome of a successful appeal is setting aside of the lower court's decision and remittal for reconsideration.

An intermediate appellate court, the Cour d'appel, hears general appeals de novo on points of law and procedure as well as errors of fact and reasoning. The Court of Cassation only decides matters of points of law or procedure on the record, as opposed to factual errors. Lower courts may petition the Court for an interlocutory order during the proceedings on any new and complex point of law; any such order, however, is not final or conclusive.

=== Appeal procedure ===
A case is heard by a bench of three or five relevant divisional justices. For either civil or criminal appeals, the bench seats by three judges unless the Chief Justice or the divisional presiding justice orders a full bench of five judges. Furthermore, any one of the three judges originally assigned to the bench may order it expanded to five. If the case falls in the legal areas handled by more than one division, the Chief Justice may order the divisional court, rather than a Bench, to consider the case.

The Court can affirm a decision from below by dismissing the appeal (rejet du pourvoi) or overturn or amend the decision by allowing the appeal (accueil du pourvoi). If it finds that the lower court erred, it sets aside the lower court decision and remits the case with its opinion to an appellate court for reconsideration (cassation avec renvoi). If only a portion of a ruling is overturned, it is called cassation partielle, or partial setting aside. Sometimes, the Court may overturn a lower court ruling and judge the case ex proprio motu without being petitioned (cassation sans renvoi), as long as the merits and facts of the case are on record.

When overturned, the case is remanded to a second appellate court, in other words not the appellate court whose decision is being appealed; never to the same judges. The decision of the Bench of the Court of Cassation or Divisional Court is not binding on the lower court, and the appellate court has full discretion to decide the case, but the higher court's ruling has persuasive authority. The appellate court's ruling may again be appealed to the Court of Cassation. If so, the Full Court hears and judges the case. It may, again, uphold an earlier decision or reverse it and remand the case to another appellate court. In the latter case, the determination of the Full Court is binding; the facts, however, may be reviewed by the court retrying the case.

Published judgments are extremely brief, containing a statement of the case—citing relevant statutory authorities—and a summary of ruling. The ruling does not contain a ratio decidendi in the style of common-law jurisdictions. (Note: The ratio decidendi, which largely lays out judicial interpretation of law, is important for common-law jurisdictions because rulings are determined largely through case law whereas in civil law countries like France, procedurally speaking, courts are formally forbidden to interpret law and do not rule based on case law.) Instead, it is left to legal experts to explain the importance of rulings. The Court often drastically changes the way the Civil Code or other statutory laws are interpreted. Legal digests, such as the Recueil Dalloz, and treatises written by legal scholars analyze and explain rulings through precedents. Much of this information is available through online databases.

Unlike common-law jurisdictions, there is no doctrine of binding precedent (stare decisis) in France. Therefore, previous decisions of higher courts do not bind lower courts in the same hierarchy, though they are often followed and have persuasive authority. Instead, the French legal system subscribes to the legal doctrine of jurisprudence constante according to which courts should follow a series of decisions that are in accord with each other and judges should rule on their own interpretation of the law.

==== Criminal appeals ====
Major felonies (indictable offences), called crimes in French, are tried by jury in a county Court of Assizes. In the past, their decisions were not open to appeal in an intermediate appellate court, and before 2001, could only be appealed to the Supreme Court. The Court would review the case on points of procedure and law only, and when handing down a reversal, which was uncommon except for capital punishment cases, vested a second Court of Assizes to retry the case. An argument in favor of this system was that allowing appeals to be tried by active judges after having been decided by a jury would in essence deny popular sovereignty. Since 2001, Assize court rulings may be appealed on points of fact to a Court of Assizes in another county, vested by the Court, and before a larger jury. The case is then fully retried. For procedural issues, appeals to the Supreme Court are still possible since assize courts, which operate by jury trial, would not be competent to hear them.

==== Certified questions ====
Where no appeal has been made but the government disagrees with the lower court's interpretation of the law, it may order the Chief Prosecutor to "lay an appeal before the Court in the interest of law" (former un pourvoi dans l'intérêt de la loi), i.e., appeal to certify a question of general public importance. The Chief Prosecutor may do so sua sponte or at the Court's behest in either civil or criminal cases. The Court will then issue an advisory opinion which has no bearing on the lower court's ruling since it was satisfactory to all parties involved and no motion was made to appeal. If the government is dissatisfied with the law as stated by the courts, it may ask Parliament to rewrite the law, as long as no constitutional issue is involved.

=== Other duties ===
The Court publishes an annual report on the French court system. The report includes a section with suggested changes to laws concerning the legal system, including criminal procedure. The Court awards damages to defendants exonerated after incarceration. Some high-level members of the court are ex officio members of special ad hoc courts; the investigatory commission of the High Court of Justice (Haute Cour de Justice), which may be convened to try the French President for high treason; the French Court of Justice (Cour de Justice de la République), which may be convened to try current or former cabinet ministers for crimes committed while in office; and the National Judicial Council (Conseil supérieur de la magistrature), which serves as a court of judicial discipline and disciplinary counsel. The High Court of Justice has never been convened during the Fifth Republic and the French Court of Justice, only rarely.

== Other related courts ==
The Court is not the only court of last resort in France. Cases involving claims against government bodies, local authorities, or the central government, including all delegated legislation (e.g., statutory instruments, ministerial orders), are heard by the administrative courts, for which the court of last resort is the Conseil d'État. In cases where there appears to be concurrent jurisdiction or a conflict of laws between the judicial and administrative courts, whether both retain jurisdiction ("positive dispute") or decline jurisdiction ("negative dispute"), the Jurisdictional Disputes Court (Tribunal des Conflits) decides the issue. The Court is composed of 4 members from both senior courts and occasionally, to break a tie, the justice minister who, if present, presides.

Neither court has the power to strike down primary legislation, such as acts of Parliament. The courts can, however, refuse to apply any statutory provision they consider inconsistent with France's international treaty obligations. Constitutional review lies in the Constitutional Council, which can strike down any law that it deems unconstitutional. Before a law is enacted, the French President, the speaker of either house of Parliament, or, more commonly, 60 parliamentarians from the same house may petition the Council for review. Some laws, mostly constitutional laws (loi organique), come before the Constitutional Council for review without first being petitioned. Courts may adopt a restrictive approach to applying statute. A 2009 reform, effective on 1 March 2010, enables parties to a lawsuit or trial to question the constitutionality of the law that is being applied to them. The procedure, known as question prioritaire de constitutionnalité, is broadly as follows: the question is raised before the trial judge and, if it has merit, it is forwarded to the appropriate supreme court (Council of State if the referral comes from an administrative court, Cour de Cassation for other courts). The supreme court collects such referrals and submits them to the Constitutional Council. If the Constitutional Council rules a law is unconstitutional, the law is struck down and no longer has legal force; this decision applies to everybody and not just the appelant in the case at hand.

The European Court of Human Rights (ECtHR) has jurisdiction over claims of government violations in breach of the European Convention on Human Rights in any ECHR member country, which includes all EU member countries. Before the ECtHR grants appeal, a claimant must have exhausted all available judicial recourse in the violating country; in France this means following the appeals process to either of the senior courts. Even so, the ECtHR has original jurisdiction, not appellate jurisdiction.

Additionally, French courts may petition the European Court of Justice to certify a question of law concerning EU law.

== See also ==
- French criminal law
- Jurisdictional dualism in France
