= 1996 Paris RER bombing =

Railway line bombing in Paris

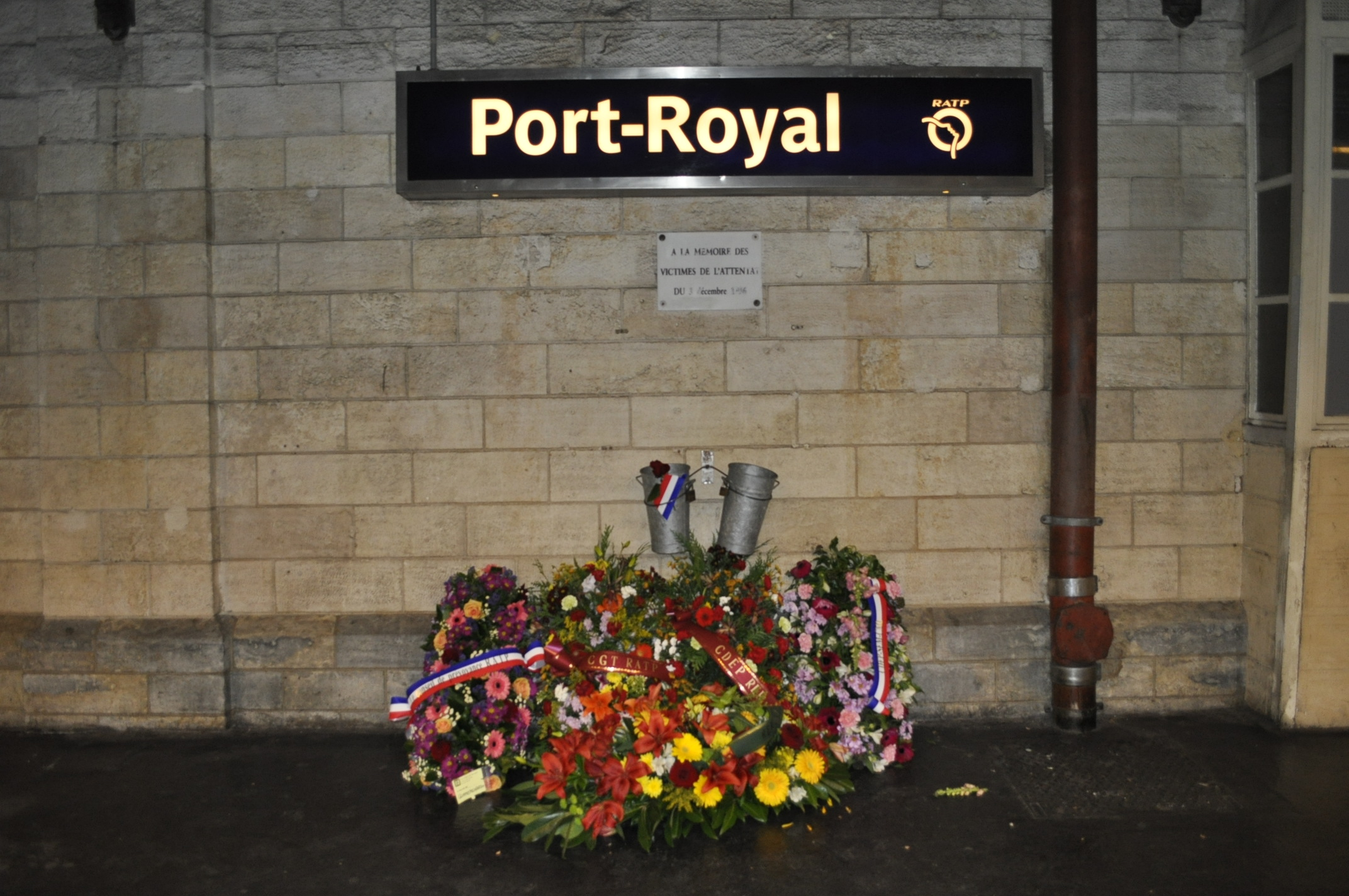
- A memorial to the victims (2014)
- Location: 48°50′23.55″N 2°20′13.34″E; Port-Royal station in Paris, France
- Date: 3 December 1996; 29 years ago
- Target: RER passengers
- Attack type: Bombing
- Weapon: Improvised explosive device
- Deaths: 4
- Injuries: 91
- Perpetrators: Unknown, GIA suspected

On 3 December 1996 an IED detonated on the southbound tracks of the Port-Royal Réseau Express Régional (RER) station in Paris, France. Four people were killed in the bombing: two French citizens, a Moroccan and a Canadian.

Following the bombing, French officials activated the "Vigipirate" nationwide security plan drawn up a year earlier in the wake of a series of bombings by the Armed Islamic Group of Algeria (GIA). The plan included police and army patrols in sensitive public areas and spot checks across the country.

Jean-Louis Bruguière and Jean-François Ricard were in charge of the bombing file. No group took responsibility for the attack, but the GIA was suspected of being behind the attack. However, unlike this bombing, the group had claimed all the bombings in the campaign.

== See also ==
- 1995 France bombings
