= Cluny–La Sorbonne station =

Metro station in Paris, France

Cluny–La Sorbonne
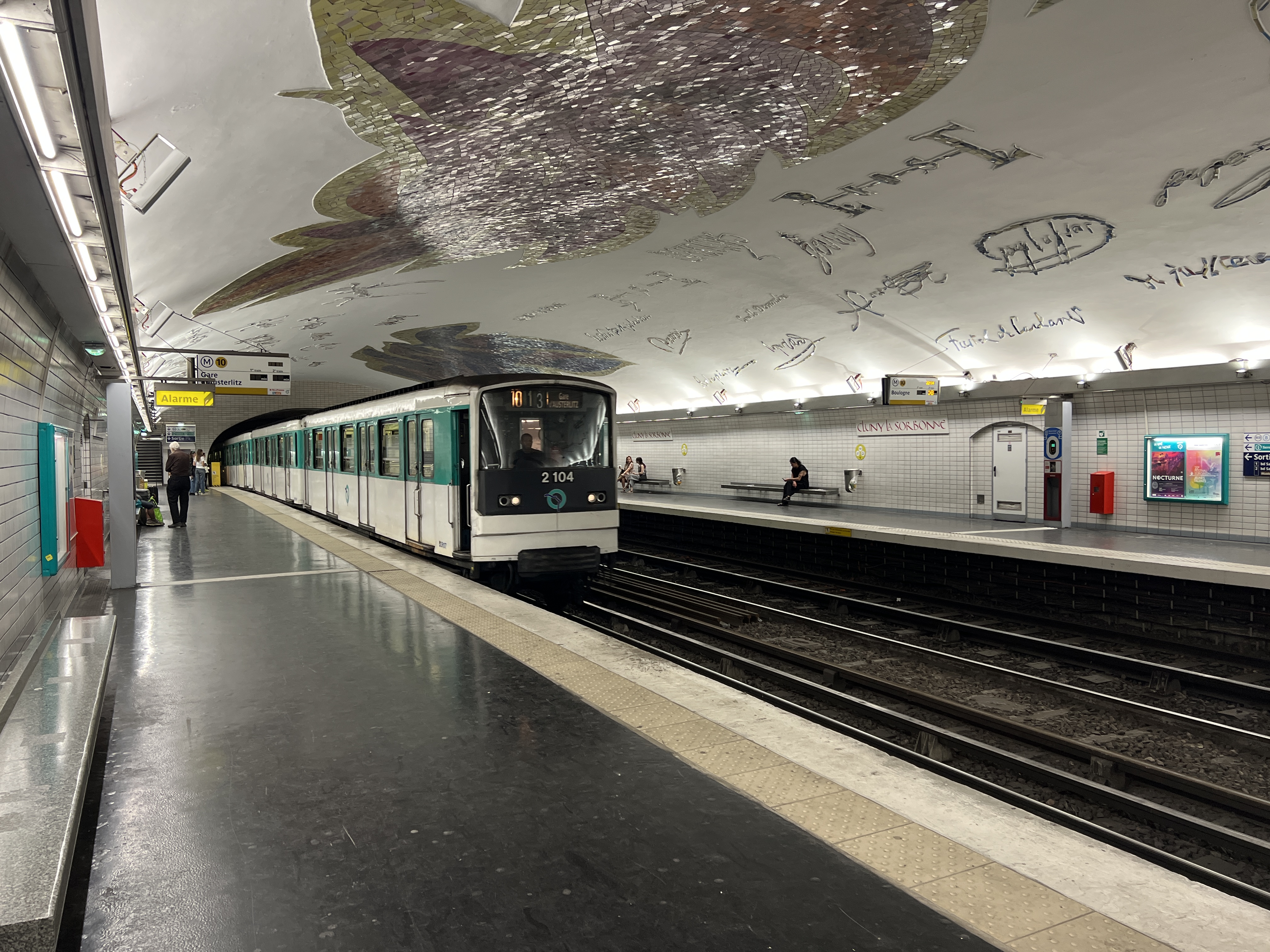

General information
- Location: 5th arrondissement of Paris; Île-de-France; France
- Coordinates: 48°51′04″N 2°20′40″E
- System: Paris Métro station
- Owner: RATP
- Operator: RATP

Other information
- Fare zone: 1

Key dates
- 15 February 1930: Opened
- 2 September 1939: Closed
- 15 December 1988: Reopened

Passengers
- 2013: 2,509,657
- Rank: 219th out of 302

Services
Preceding station	Paris Metro	Following station
Odéon towards Boulogne–Pont de Saint-Cloud	Line 10	Maubert–Mutualité towards Gare d'Austerlitz
Connections to other stations
Preceding station	RER	Following station
Châtelet–Les Halles towards Aéroport Charles de Gaulle 2 TGV or Mitry–Claye	RER B transfer at Saint-Michel–Notre-Dame	Luxembourg towards Robinson or Saint-Rémy-lès-Chevreuse
Musée d'Orsay towards Pontoise, Versailles Château Rive Gauche or Saint-Quentin-en-Yvelines	RER C transfer at Saint-Michel–Notre-Dame	Gare d'Austerlitz towards Massy-Palaiseau, Dourdan-la-Forêt or Saint-Martin-d'Étampes
Location
- Location within Paris

Cluny–La Sorbonne (French pronunciation: [klyni la sɔʁbɔn]) is a station on Line 10 of the Paris Métro. Located in the 5th arrondissement, it serves the Latin Quarter on the Rive Gauche. The station is connected to the Saint-Michel–Notre-Dame on RER B and RER C. In 2013, the station was used by 2,509,657 passengers, making it the 219th busiest out of 302 on the Métro network.

== History ==
The station was opened as Cluny on 15 February 1930 with the extension of Line 10 from Odéon to Place d'Italie (now on Line 7). This station was closed between 2 September 1939 and 15 December 1988, when it reopened to connect with the new Saint-Michel–Notre-Dame RER station and give access to Boulevard Saint-Germain. The station is named after the Hôtel de Cluny and the Sorbonne. Its original name was simply Cluny; it adopted its current name upon reopening in 1988.

This station is unusual on the Métro network for having a third, centre track that is not used in revenue service. This track is used in non-revenue service to connect the tracks of Line 4 and Line 10.

== Passenger services ==
=== Access ===
The station has three entrances, each consisting of a fixed staircase with a Dervaux-type balustrade:

- Access 1 - Boulevard Saint-Michel leading to the corner of Boulevard Saint-Germain and Boulevard Saint-Michel to the right of Rue de la Harpe;
- Access 2 - Boulevard Saint-Germain - Musée du Moyen-Âge located at the corner of the same boulevards opposite the Musée de Cluny. This access is the most direct for the entrances to the Sorbonne, the Musée de Cluny and the Square Samuel-Paty via the Rue Du Sommerard and the Place Paul-Painlevé.
- Access 3 "Rue Saint-Jacques", adorned with a Dervaux candelabra, located at the corner of Boulevard Saint-Germain (even-numbered side) and Rue Saint-Jacques.

In the corridor connecting with the RER, there are two monumental ceramic mosaics, created by the French painter Claude Maréchal between 1985 and 1988 following a competition organized by the RATP.

=== Station layout ===
G	Street Level	Exit/Entrance
B1	Mezzanine	to Exits/Entrances, connections to
Platform level	Side platform, doors will open on the right
Platform level	Westbound	← toward Boulogne–Pont de Saint-Cloud (Odéon)
Platform level	Center track	No regular service
Platform level	Eastbound	toward Gare d'Austerlitz (Maubert–Mutualité) →
Platform level	Side platform, doors will open on the right

=== Platforms ===
Cluny–La Sorbonne is a station with a particular configuration. It has two platforms separated by three tracks under an elliptical vault, a unique layout that cannot be found anywhere else on the network. The central track, which has no platform, is the beginning of a service connection with line 4, which connects with line 10 at the nearby Odéon station.

The vault of the station is painted white and decorated with mosaics entitled Ailes et Flammes (Wings and Flames) by the French painter Jean René Bazaine, accompanied by the signatures, also in mosaic, of famous figures of the Latin Quarter, among them renowned writers such as Jean Racine, Molière, Jules Michelet, Victor Hugo, and Arthur Rimbaud. The white ceramic tiles are flat, laid horizontally and aligned with the tunnel exits and walls, the latter being vertical on their lower part and devoid of advertisements. Lighting is provided by light grey rectangular strips fixed at the boundary between the jambs and the vault on which the light is projected. The name of the station is inscribed in a pseudo-handwritten font — unusual in Paris metro stations — in red letters on white enamel plates. The platforms are equipped with grey benches.

=== Other connections ===
The station connects with RER lines B and C at Saint-Michel - Notre-Dame station. In addition, it is possible to reach, via this last line, the Saint-Michel station on line 4 of the metro. However, this indirect interconnection is not indicated by the RATP given the presence of a more direct connection with line 4 at the neighbouring Odéon station.

The station is also served by lines 21, 27, 38, 47, 63, 75, 86, 87 and 96 of the RATP Bus Network. It is also served by the tourist line Tootbus Paris. In addition, it is served at night by lines N12, N13, N14, N15, N21, N22 and N122 of the Noctilien bus network.

== Places of interest ==
The Hôtel de Cluny was once the town house of the abbots of Cluny and is now the Musée de Cluny, an important museum containing a variety of artifacts from the Middle Ages. The Hôtel de Cluny is partly constructed on impressive remains of Gallo-Roman baths dating from the 3rd century (known as the Thermes de Cluny) and may still be visited.

The Collège de Sorbonne (founded in 1257) was a constituent of the University of Paris although, at least in the 20th century, the term Sorbonne has been applied to the whole of the University. The university was broken up in 1970 into thirteen universities. Three of them contain "Sorbonne" in their names (University of Paris 1 Pantheon-Sorbonne, University of Sorbonne Nouvelle Paris 3 and Paris-Sorbonne University) and are nearby.

The Collège de France (founded 1530), a higher research establishment, is also nearby.

== Gallery ==
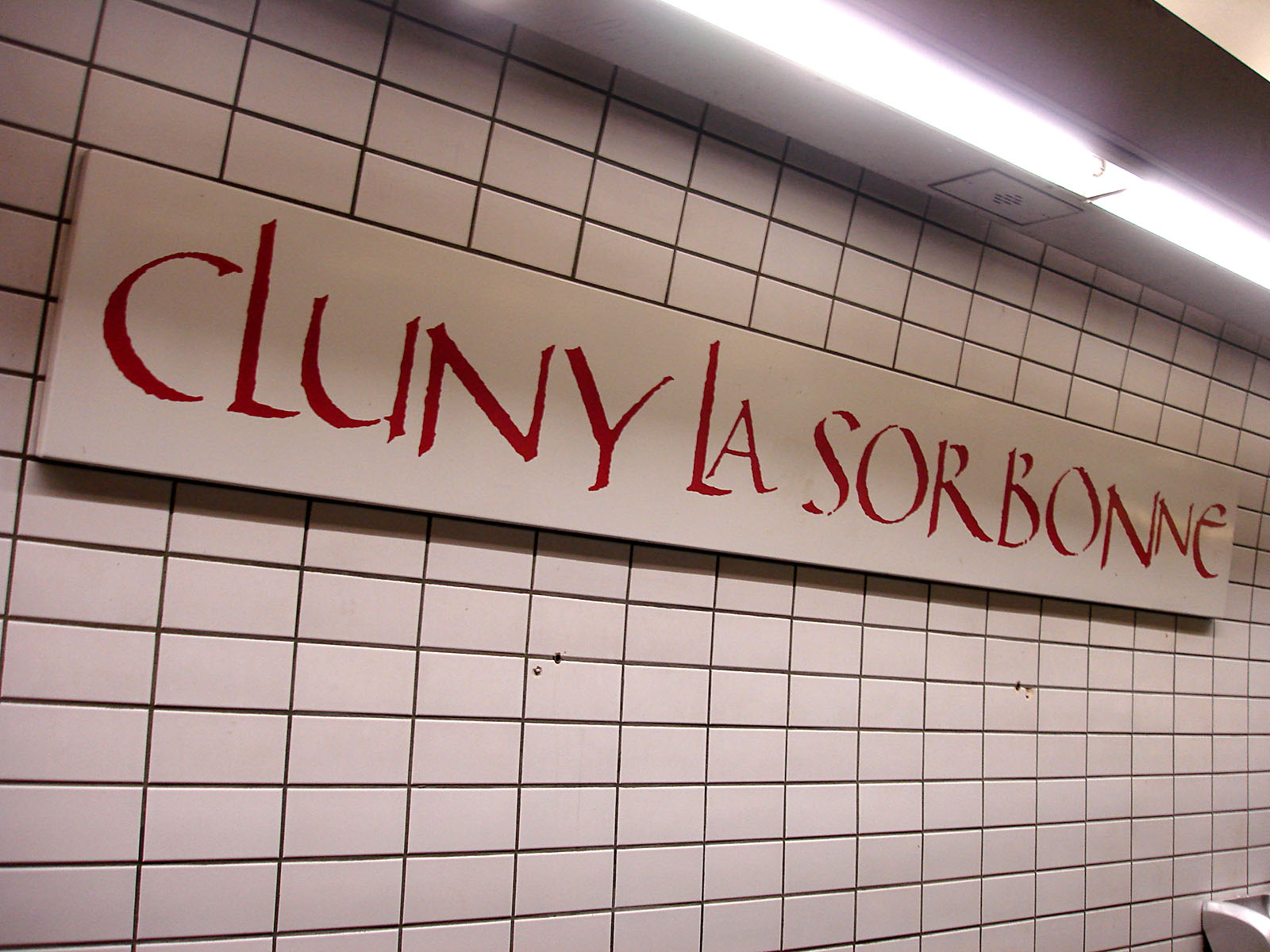
Platform signage

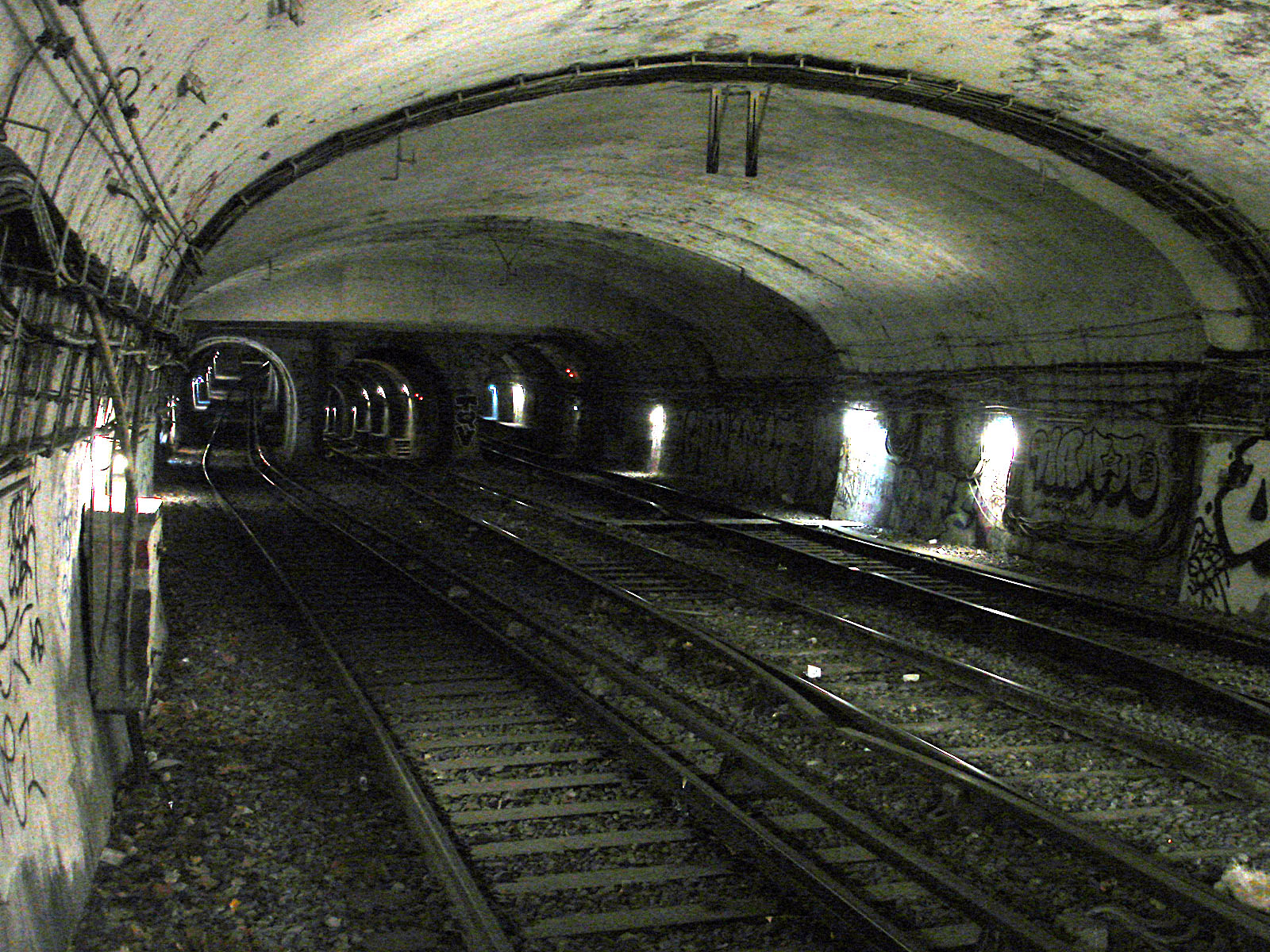
The three tracks at Cluny–La Sorbonne station
