= 1995 France bombings =

Terror attacks by Algerian militants

- Part of the spillover of the Algerian Civil War and Islamic terrorism in Europe
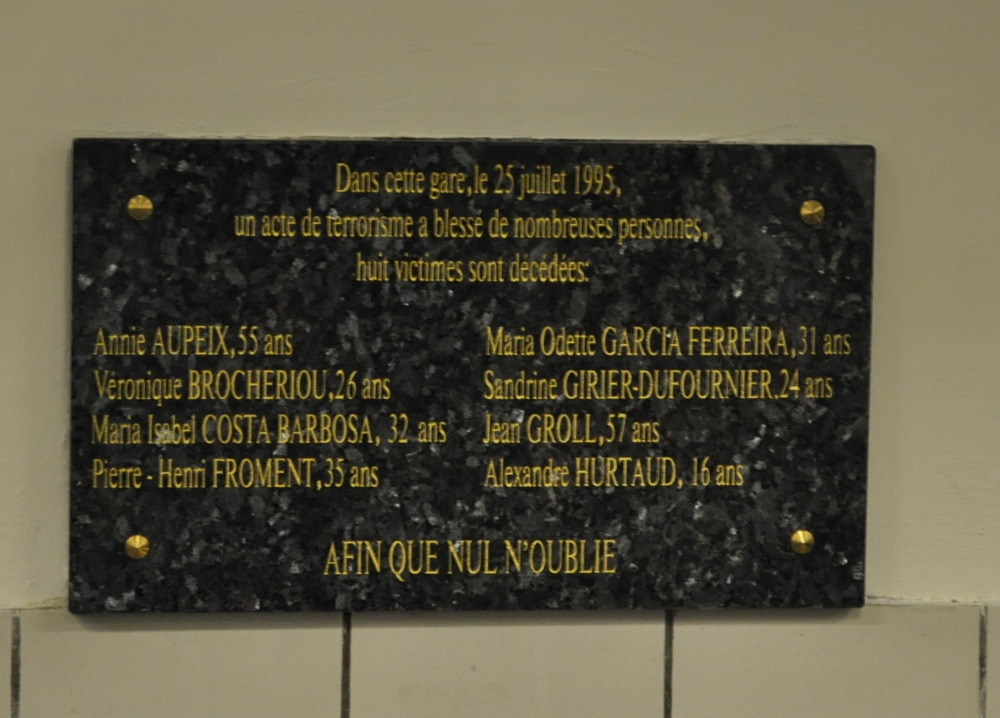
- Plaque commemorating the victims of the Saint-Michel station bombing on 25 July 1995
- Location: 48.8537°N 2.3449°E; Paris and Auvergne-Rhône-Alpes, France
- Date: 25 July – 17 October 1995
- Weapons: Improvised explosive devices, school bombing
- Deaths: 8
- Injuries: 190
- Perpetrator: Armed Islamic Group
- Motive: To force the French government to withdraw support from the Algerian government during the Algerian Civil War
- Convicted: Rachid Ramda

A series of attacks targeted public transport systems in Paris and Lyon, as well as a school in Villeurbanne, in 1995. They were carried out by the Armed Islamic Group of Algeria (GIA), who sought to expand the Algerian Civil War to France. The attacks killed eight people, all during the first attack on 25 July. The attack also injured 190 people. The assassination of Abdelbaki Sahraoui, a co-founder of the Islamic Salvation Front (FIS), was a prelude to the extension of the Islamists' terrorist campaign in France.

== Attacks ==
On 25 July 1995 a gas bottle exploded in the Saint-Michel station of line B of the RER metropolitan train system in Paris. Emergency service vehicles then used Place Saint-Michel and the surrounding bridges and streets to attend the scene, while Parvis Notre-Dame became a helicopter landing site and a nearby café, Le depart Saint-Michel, was used as a field hospital. At 8:00 that evening, national news on France 2 announced that four people had been killed and another 40 injured in a "mysterious explosion". At that time, no official sources had confirmed that it was a terrorist attack. This was only confirmed later, and the outcome was said to be eight deaths and 117 injured. It was the deadliest terror attack in France since the 1983 Orly Airport attack, and would be the only deadly attack for the GIA's 1995 bombing campaign in France.

On 17 August, a second bomb hidden in a public bin near the Arc de Triomphe wounded 16 people. The bomb was composed of a gas bottle filled with nails.

On 26 August a huge bomb was found on the railway tracks of a high-speed rail line near Lyon. It was supposed to explode when a train passed. Fingerprints of Khaled Kelkal and Boualem Bensaïd were found on the bomb. The leader of the group, Khaled Kelkal was quickly identified and his picture appeared all over France. Bombing attacks continued with an attack on 3 September at an open market in the 11th arrondissement of Paris, causing three injuries; and on 7 September when a car bomb exploded near a Jewish school in Villeurbanne, a town near Lyon, causing thirteen injuries.

The wanted suspect, Khaled Kelkal, was killed on 29 September by members of the French EPIGN gendarmerie unit near Lyon as he resisted arrest. Nonetheless, the attacks continued on 6 October, the day of Khaled Kelkal's funeral; another gas bottle exploded in the Maison Blanche station of the Paris Métro, wounding twelve people. Boualem Bensaïd's fingerprints were again found on the bomb. The next day, a statement from GIA commander Djamel Zitouni, written on 23 September, arrived at the Reuters press agency in Cairo. He said the "Jihad"- the "military strikes at the heart of France", were intended to punish it for supporting the Algerian government. A letter was also sent to Jacques Chirac through the French Embassy in Algiers, urging him to convert to Islam.

On 17 October a gas bottle exploded between the Musée d'Orsay and Saint-Michel–Notre-Dame stations of RER Line C, wounding 29. Investigators found a transportation card on Smaïn Aït Ali Belkacem used a few minutes before the attack in a nearby underground station.

Additional bombs were found and cleared without casualties during morning searches of Metro and RER stations, often in public toilets. Increased security required the removal of all public bins, to prevent bombs from being hidden inside.

== Arrests and trials ==
Members of the Armed Islamic Group and the "Kelkal Group" have since been prosecuted on various charges. Some suspects fled to the United Kingdom. Extradition proceedings against Rachid Ramda began in 1995 and went on for nearly ten years, during which he remained detained in HM Prison Belmarsh. Ramda was eventually extradited to France on 1 December 2005 in connection with the bombings. On 26 October 2007 Ramda was sentenced to life in prison for financing the attacks.

According to FBI terrorism consultant Evan Kohlmann, part of the money used to finance the bombings came from people connected to the Brandbergen Mosque in Haninge, Sweden.

== Aftermath ==
Algeria-France relations were heavily affected by these events. Jacques Chirac refused to meet with Algerian ministers, openly saying that the GIA could have been manipulated by the Algerian secret services.

Legislation on terrorism in France was reinforced with a new law in 1996, allowing police forces to perform searches at night. The French government also suspended the Schengen Acquis which allows free movement across borders within Europe, keeping the restrictions in place until March 1996.

Vigipirate, the French national security alert system was activated in September 1995 as a result of the attacks, and is still in place. The crisis only lessened when Lionel Jospin became prime minister in 1997 and Abdelaziz Bouteflika became the new Algerian president in 1999.

== See also ==
- Boualem Bensaid
- Khaled Kelkal
- Rachid Ramda
- Djamel Zitouni
- Transit police
- List of Islamist terrorist attacks
- List of terrorist incidents in France
- 1996 Paris RER bombing
- Air France Flight 8969
