= Port-Royal station =

Railway station in Paris, France

Port-Royal
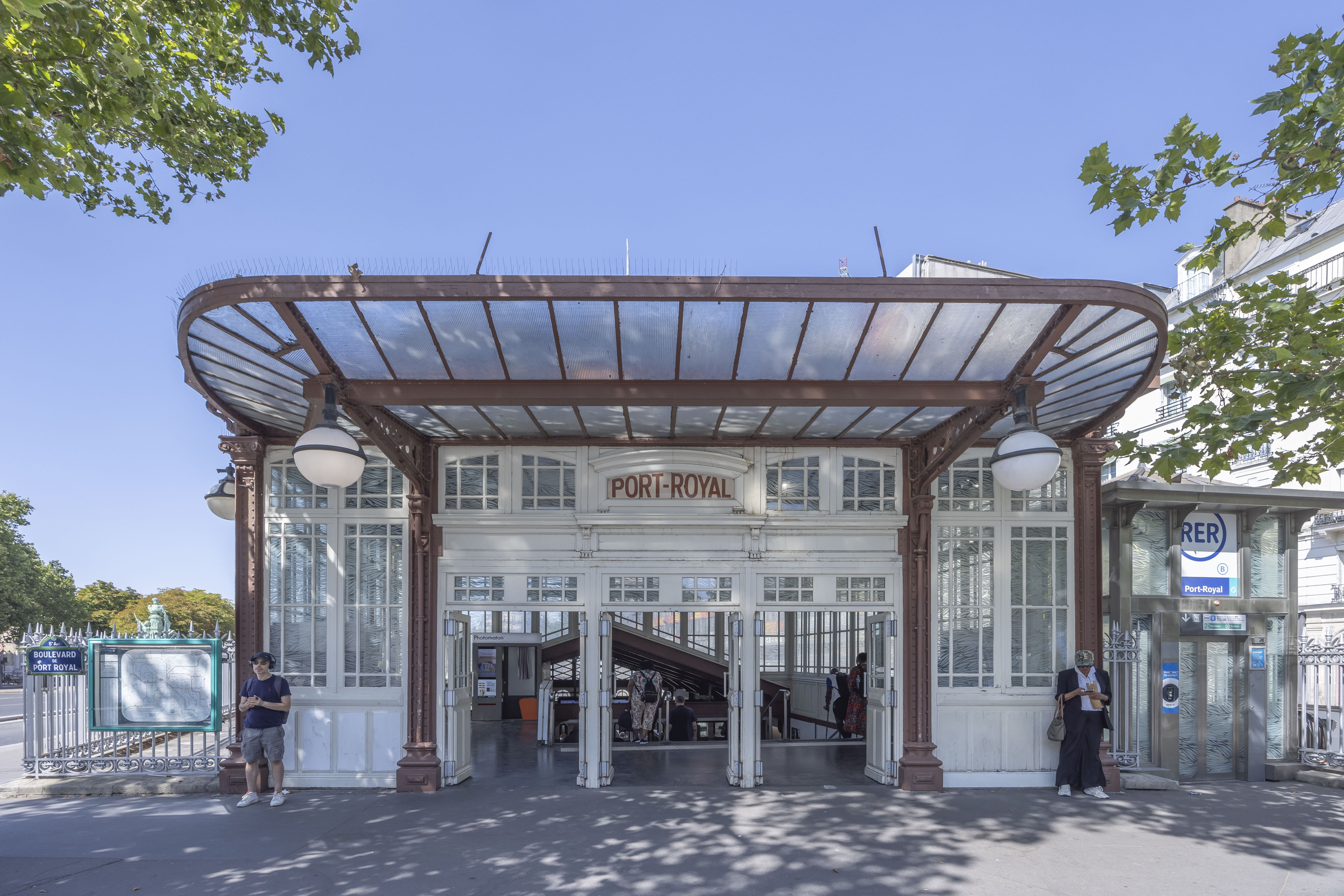
- Port-Royal station entrance

General information
- Location: Boulevard de Port-Royal; Paris; France
- Coordinates: 48°50′24″N 2°20′13″E
- Operator: RATP Group
- Line: Ligne de Sceaux
- Platforms: 2 side platforms
- Tracks: 2
- Connections: RATP Bus: 38 82 83 91; Noctilien: N01 N02 N14 N21 N122

Construction
- Structure type: Below-grade
- Accessible: Yes, by request to staff

Other information
- Station code: 87758623
- Fare zone: 1

History
- Opened: 31 March 1895

Passengers
- 2019: 3,479,339

Services
Preceding station	RER	Following station
Luxembourg towards Aéroport Charles de Gaulle 2 TGV or Mitry–Claye	RER B	Denfert-Rochereau towards Robinson or Saint-Rémy-lès-Chevreuse
Location

Port-Royal station (French pronunciation: [pɔʁ ʁwajal]) is a French railway station on the RER B line in Paris. It is located in the 5th arrondissement, not far from its tripoint border with the 6th and 14th arrondissements. It is named after Port-Royal Abbey, Paris.

== History ==
The station opened on 31 March 1895, as part of the Compagnie du chemin de fer de Paris à Orléans extension of the Ligne de Sceaux from Denfert-Rochereau station north to Luxembourg station.

The station has a unique architectural style with the station house located above the tracks on a metal footbridge. This particular arrangement was necessary because of a lack of space at the station site. Today, the station house retains its original appearance with its platforms protected by glass canopies, but the ends of the platforms have been extended to accommodate longer trains.

Port-Royal station was targeted in the 3 December 1996 Paris RER bombing when an explosive device detonated on the southbound tracks of the station. Four people were killed in the attack.

== Gallery ==
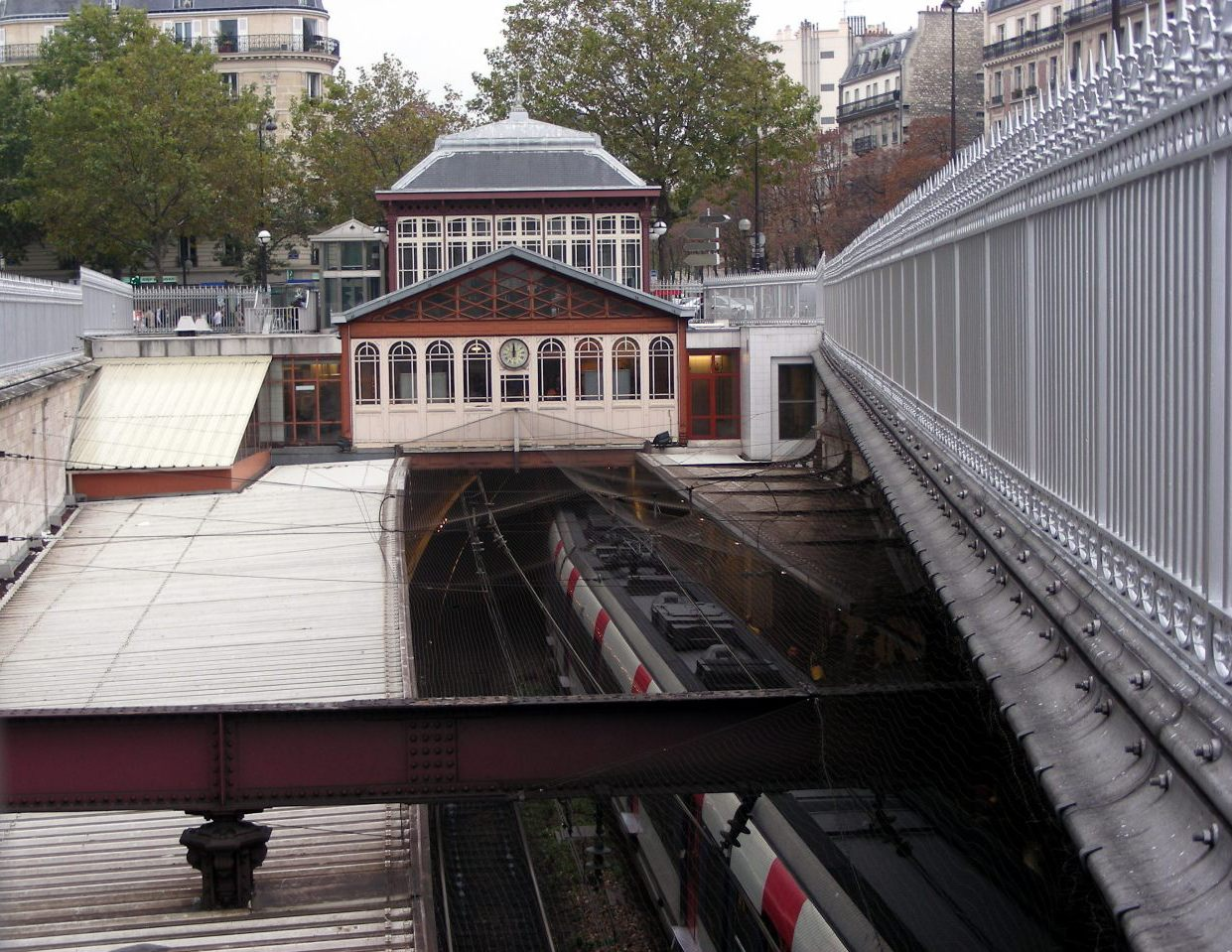
The station house can be seen sitting atop the platforms on the Boulevard de Port-Royal

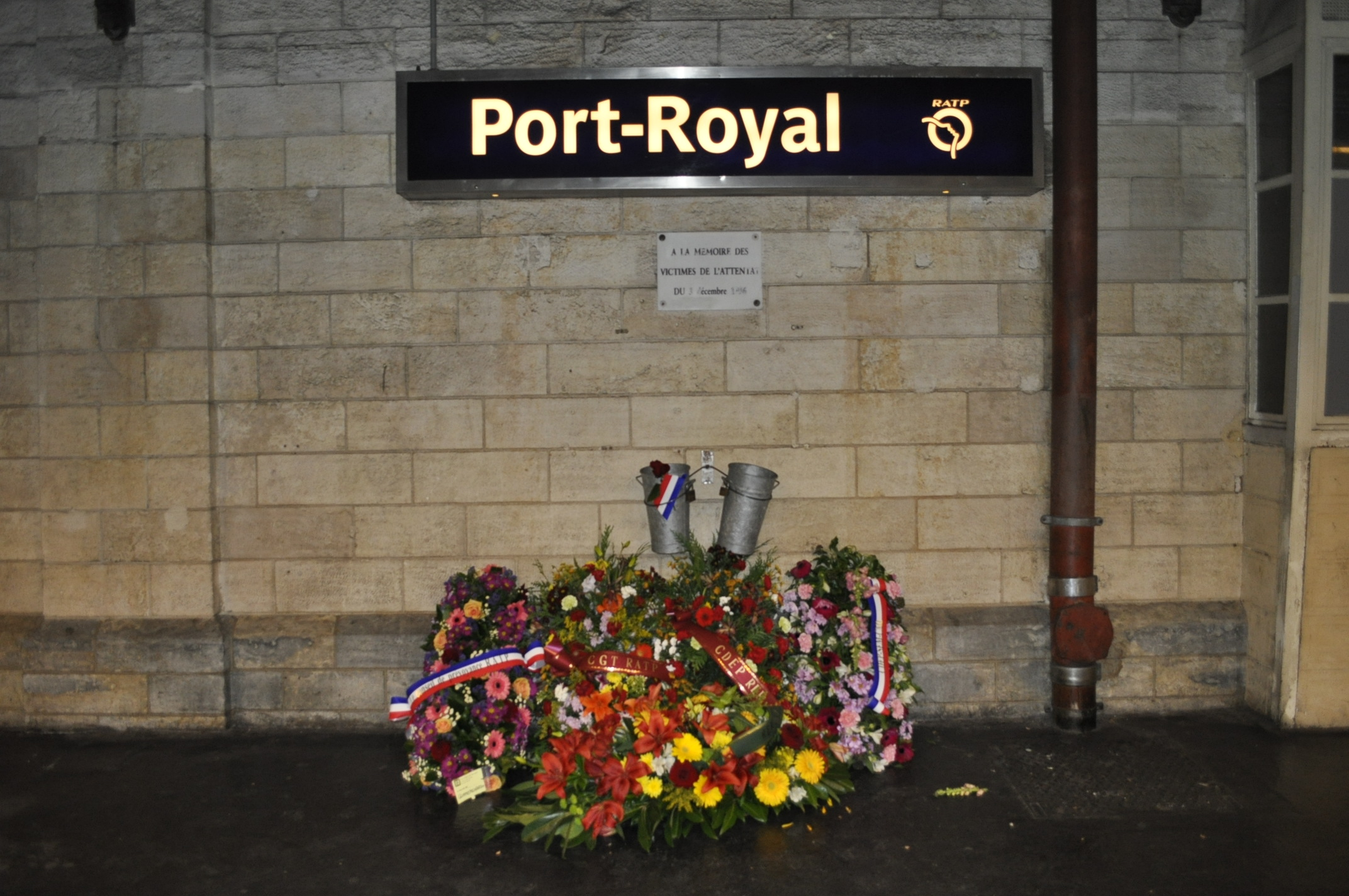
Memorial at the station to the victims of the 1996 Paris RER bombing

== See also ==
- List of stations of the Paris RER
