= Ouvéa cave hostage taking =

1988 hostage crisis in New Caledonia

Coordinates: 20.6522°S 166.5619°E

The Ouvéa cave hostage taking occurred from 22 April 1988 to 5 May 1988 on the island of Ouvéa, New Caledonia, a south Pacific archipelago under control of France. During the stand-off and seizure of a brigade of gendarmerie, members of an independence movement, the Kanak and Socialist National Liberation Front, killed four gendarmes (including two unarmed) and took 27 unarmed gendarmes hostages (weapons were in the armory during the night), later also taking hostage a public prosecutor who had been sent to negotiate, seven members of the French GIGN military unit and a regular army lieutenant. They demanded talks with the French government about independence for New Caledonia from France. In previous years, about ten gendarmes had been killed in New Caledonia in connection with the independence movement, also some Kanaks had been killed by policiers and gendarmes as well like Richard Kamuda in 1975, Théodore Daye in 1980, Eloi Machoro and Marcel Nonaro in 1985 and a young Kanak of the Saint-Louis tribe in 1987.

The French government said it refused to negotiate with terrorists or agree to the group's demands. It sent a joint hostage recovery team that consisted of:

- 12 from Groupe d'Intervention de la Gendarmerie Nationale (GIGN)
- 15 from Commando Hubert
- 30 from 11^{e} régiment parachutiste de choc (covert unit part of the Directorate-General for External Security)
- 3 from Escadron Parachutiste d'Intervention de la Gendarmerie Nationale (EPIGN)

Nineteen of the hostage-takers and two members of the hostage recovery team were killed in the assault. There were allegations that most of the dead hostage-takers had been summarily executed after being captured.

After having attacked the Gendarmes, the rebels retreated to a remote part of the island covered by deep jungle. Negotiations began between the government and hostage takers but were not effective. Some GIGN operators became hostages too as the government was trying to find a peaceful solution.

== Assault ==
Operation Victor
Date	May 4 - 5, 1988
Location	Ouvéa Island, New Caledonia
Result	GIGN victory

Belligerents
France	FLNKS

Commanders and leaders
(France) Jacques Vidal	Alphonse Dianou †

Units involved
GIGN; Commando Hubert; 11^{e} choc EPIGN	

Strength
60	~30

Casualties and losses
2 killed 1 wounded	19 killed
- 1 hostage wounded (friendly fire)

The operation was highly uncommon for the number of hostage takers (more than 30) and the size of the assault force and the location (a rugged jungle looking like New Guinea or Eniwetok).

The assault "Operation Victor" was initiated on 4 May at around 22:15. Around seventy-four operators moved into the forest towards the hostage location. The Kanak independentists numbered around 30 and were heavily armed (assault rifles, rifles and some heavy machine-guns).

The hostages had been located in Gossannah cave, a series of caves on Ouvéa Island. The assault team moved into their final assault positions roughly 300 meters from the cave entrance.

Commando Hubert operators were tasked to neutralize the AA52 7.5mm medium machine gun located at the entrance to the cave as it would pin down any approaching force and increase the risk of the hostages being harmed. - The 11^{e} choc was to neutralize other Kanak positions located to the south. A joint GIGN and Commando Hubert team would approach the entrance to the cave where hostages were located.

The attack started at 06:15 but assault teams soon understood that starting positions were not accurate, leading to some delays as the terrain was often impassable. A Puma helicopter that was supposed to provide a noise distraction was three minutes late and 300 metres off target. As a result, the separatists were warned of the assault and had time to pull back inside the caves. Some Kanak sentries spotted the approaching assault team who had moved further north than they should have and opened fire, wounding a Commando Hubert operator. Another operator shot and killed the sentry that had fired. Another assault force member was killed as he crossed the open ground in front of the cave. The Commando Hubert team then cleared the area in front of the machine gun position with flamethrowers. During the one-hour fight, two operators from 11th Choc (Adjudant Régis Pedrazza and Private Jean-Yves Véron) and twelve independentists were killed.

The hostages managed to hide at the bottom of the cave in the confusion and prevented Kanaks from entering this part of the cave (as a gun had been smuggled to them during the negotiations). The Kanak group surrendered but, by the end of the assault, nineteen hostage-takers and two members of the military had been killed. All the hostages were saved.

According to a later report of Captain Philippe Legorjus, then GIGN leader: "Some acts of barbarity have been committed by the French military in contradiction with their military duty". In the post-mortems, it appeared that 3 of the Kanak activists had been executed and the leader of the hostage-takers, Alphonse Dianou, who was severely injured by a gunshot in the leg, had been left without medical care, and died some hours later. Prior to this report, Captain Philippe Legorjus was accused by many of the GIGN agents who took part in the operation of weaknesses in command and to have had "dangerous absences" (some even said he fled) in the final stages of the operation. He was forced to resign from the GIGN after this operation, since nobody wanted him as chief or to fight under him.

The military authorities have always denied the version of events given by Captain Philippe Legorjus. Following a command investigation, Jean-Pierre Chevènement, Minister of Defence of the Michel Rocard government, noted that "no part of the investigation revealed that there had been summary executions". However, after his capture Alphonse Dianou was left without treatment for four hours with a bullet in the knee, his transfusion apparently torn off by a soldier. After his transfer, he died. The results of his autopsy were clear: the independence leader was beaten up. In addition, according to some participants of the operation interviewed by Le Figaro, no shots were heard in the area after the fighting ended.

== Rebellion film ==
The 2011 docudrama film Rebellion was based on the Ouvéa cave hostage crisis, as told from the point of view of the lead hostage negotiator.

== See also ==
- List of hostage crises
- Bernard Pons, French Minister for Overseas Territories at the time, who dealt with the matter.
