= Khaled Kelkal =

- Born: 28 April 1971; Mostaganem, Algeria
- Died: 29 September 1995 (aged 24); Lyon, France
- Organization: GIA
- Known for: Involvement in 1995 terror bombings in France
- Relatives: 4 sisters, 3 brothers

Khaled Kelkal (Arabic: خالد كلكال) (April 28, 1971 – September 29, 1995) was a French and Algerian terrorist affiliated with the GIA. He was involved in the 1995 terror bombings in France.

== Biography ==
Khaled Kelkal was born in 1971 in Mostaganem, Algeria. The family moved to Vaulx-en-Velin, a suburb of Lyon, when he was an infant. He had four sisters and three brothers. While attending La Martinière lycée top of his class in Lyon, he became a juvenile delinquent. His older brother Nouredine was sentenced to 9 years in prison for armed robbery. In 1990, Kelkal was placed on probation for four months for trafficking in stolen cars. A few months later, he was arrested for thefts using cars as battering rams to enter private properties. He was sentenced to four years in prison.

== Conversion to radical Islam ==
While he was incarcerated, he met "Khelif," an Islamist who had fled France to evade trial. Upon his return to France in 1989 he was sentenced to 7 years in prison. While in jail, Khelif attempted to recruit Algerians to man militant organisations in Algeria. After his release, Kelkal regularly attended the Bilal Mosque in Vaulx-en-Velin; the mosque was headed by imam Mohamed Minta, a sympathiser of the Foi et Pratique ("Faith and practice") fundamentalist organisation. In 1993, Kelkal went to Mostaganem, in Algeria, to visit his family. There, he was probably recruited by one of the radical branches of the GIA, headed by Djamel Zitouni, whose aim was to "punish France."

== Criminal activities ==
On 11 July 1995, Kelkal was involved in the assassination of Imam Sahraoui in his mosque in Paris. Sahraoui was considered too moderate by the GIA, and might have attempted to steal money from them. Four days later, in Bron, a suburb of Lyon, Kelkal opened fire on gendarmes at a checkpoint and evaded arrest. On 26 August 1995, during the bombing campaign in France, a gas bottle equipped with a detonation system was found near the Paris-Lyon TGV railway, near Cailloux-Sur-Fontaines (Rhône). The device had not exploded, and was found to be similar to the one which had been set off on 25 July in the Saint-Michel–Notre-Dame RER station. Fingerprints of Khaled Kelkal were found on the bomb, and a search for him began. His picture was displayed in public places all over France.

== Death ==
On 29 September 1995, after a search in the forest of Malval near Lyon, Kelkal was found in a place called "La Maison Blanche". He attempted to resist arrest and was shot dead by the gendarmes of EPIGN. Kelkal's death was shown on television, and a debate erupted over the shooting. On the television footage, as the gendarmes approach Kelkal, one of them was heard yelling "Finis-le, finis-le !" ("Finish him, Finish him!") Initially, Kelkal was shot in the leg, but he aimed a pistol at the gendarmes, who opened fire in self-defence.

== Aftermath ==
Using Kelkal's address book, the police arrested other terrorists. Boualem Bensaïd, Kelkal's superior, was arrested in Paris, as he was planning the bombing in a market of Lille. Further investigations revealed that Kelkal had been behind the car bomb that exploded in front of a Jewish school on 7 September 1995 in Villeurbanne, a suburb of Lyon, which was set to explode as the children left the building at the end of the school day. By a stroke of luck, the school bell rang late and no children were outside when the bomb detonated.
