= Tribunal de Paris =

Judicial court in France

Coordinates: 48.8553°N 2.3458°E

- The Tribunal de Paris
- Interactive map of Tribunal de Paris
- Jurisdiction: Paris with certain national and inter-regional cases
- Location: Batignolles, Paris
- Number of positions: 536 magistrates (361 judges, 122 magistrates, and 53 local judges) and 950 civil servants
- Website: www.tribunal-de-paris.justice.fr

President
- Currently: Peiman Ghaleh-Marzban
- Since: July 2025

Three vice-presidents

The Tribunal de Paris (French pronunciation: [tʁibynal d(ə) paʁi], lit. 'Court of Paris'), located at the Judicial Campus of Paris in Batignolles, is the largest court in France by caseload. It replaced the capital's former Tribunal de grande instance ('Court of major instance') and Tribunal d'instance ('Court of petty instance') under an amalgamation of jurisdictions that came into effect on 1 January 2020.

== Jurisdiction ==
The jurisdiction of the Paris judicial court is nationwide for matters of:

- crimes against humanity and war crimes,
- crimes committed outside the territory by members of the French armed forces or against them in peacetime (since the removal of the Tribunal of the armies of Paris in 2012),
- corruption and tax evasion. The financial prosecutor of the Republic is located near the court.
- terrorism.

The court has inter-regional jurisdiction in matters of:

- complex economic and financial affairs (one of eight specialized interregional courts of France)
- Health Affairs (one of the two specialized courts with that attached to TGI de Marseille).

For all other matters, its jurisdiction is limited to the entire capital. It is one of the courts subject to the appellate jurisdiction of the Court of Appeal of Paris.

== Organization ==
As of 2009, TGI was organized in the following hierarchy:

- President and three Vice-Presidents
  - Civil Service: 12 civil divisions and specialized services
  - Penal Service: 15 Correctional facilities and specialized services
- Prosecutor and two deputy prosecutors
  - 1st division: public action, sectored, (Note: Translator is unsure of the translation of this word) real-time processing: 4 sections,
  - 2nd division: financial center: 2 sections,
  - 3rd division: general administration, civil and news: 4 sections,
  - 4th division: fight against terrorism, offenses against state security, organized crime: sections 2,
  - 5th division: public health center, fight against economic and social delinquency: 2 sections.

In May 2019, Jean-François Ricard was appointed Advocate General at the Court of Cassation to exercise the function of anti-terrorism public prosecutor at the Tribunal de grande instance de Paris, heading a new National Terrorism Prosecution Office (Parquet national antiterroriste; PNAT), beginning on 25 June 2019. He leads a team of 25 magistrates.

== Building ==
Designed by architect Renzo Piano (famous for the Centre Pompidou), the Tribunal de Paris building consolidates several major and minor courts and tribunals into one building. The building is 38 storeys and 160 metres (520 ft) high, and has a total net floor area of 120,000 square metres (1,300,000 ft^{2}). Inside the building are 90 law courts, 30,000 square metres (320,000 ft^{2}) of offices and 20,000 square metres (220,000 ft^{2}) of public facilities.

Located close by is 36, rue du Bastion (Regional Directorate headquarters of the Judicial Paris Police Prefecture) and the Maison de l'ordre des avocats (Offices of the Parisian Bar association) - together, the three buildings form the Judicial Campus of Paris (Cité judiciaire de Paris).

The move from the Palais de Justice was announced on 29 April 2009 by Nicolas Sarkozy, and the contract was signed in 2012. The building was opened in 2018, and was officially inaugurated in April 2019 by French Prime Minister Édouard Philippe.

== Location ==
The Tribunal judiciaire is located at the Judicial Campus of Paris (Cité judiciaire de Paris) in the Batignolles district.

Porte de Clichy station on Line 13, Line 14, RER C and Tramway 3b serves the site, with the subtitle Tribunal de Paris appearing on maps and the station platforms from September 2018.

=== Previous location ===
The TGI was previously located in the Palace of Justice on the Île de la Cité along with the Court of Appeal of Paris and the Court of Cassation. This site (formerly called Palace of the City) hosted the Parlement during the Ancien Régime. The Sainte-Chapelle and Conciergerie are remnants of the medieval royal palace, the Palais de la Cité, open to the public today. The palace is adjacent to 36, quai des Orfèvres where the Direction Régionale de Police Judiciaire de Paris (Regional Directorate of the Judicial Police of Paris) was located before it, too, moved to Batignolles.

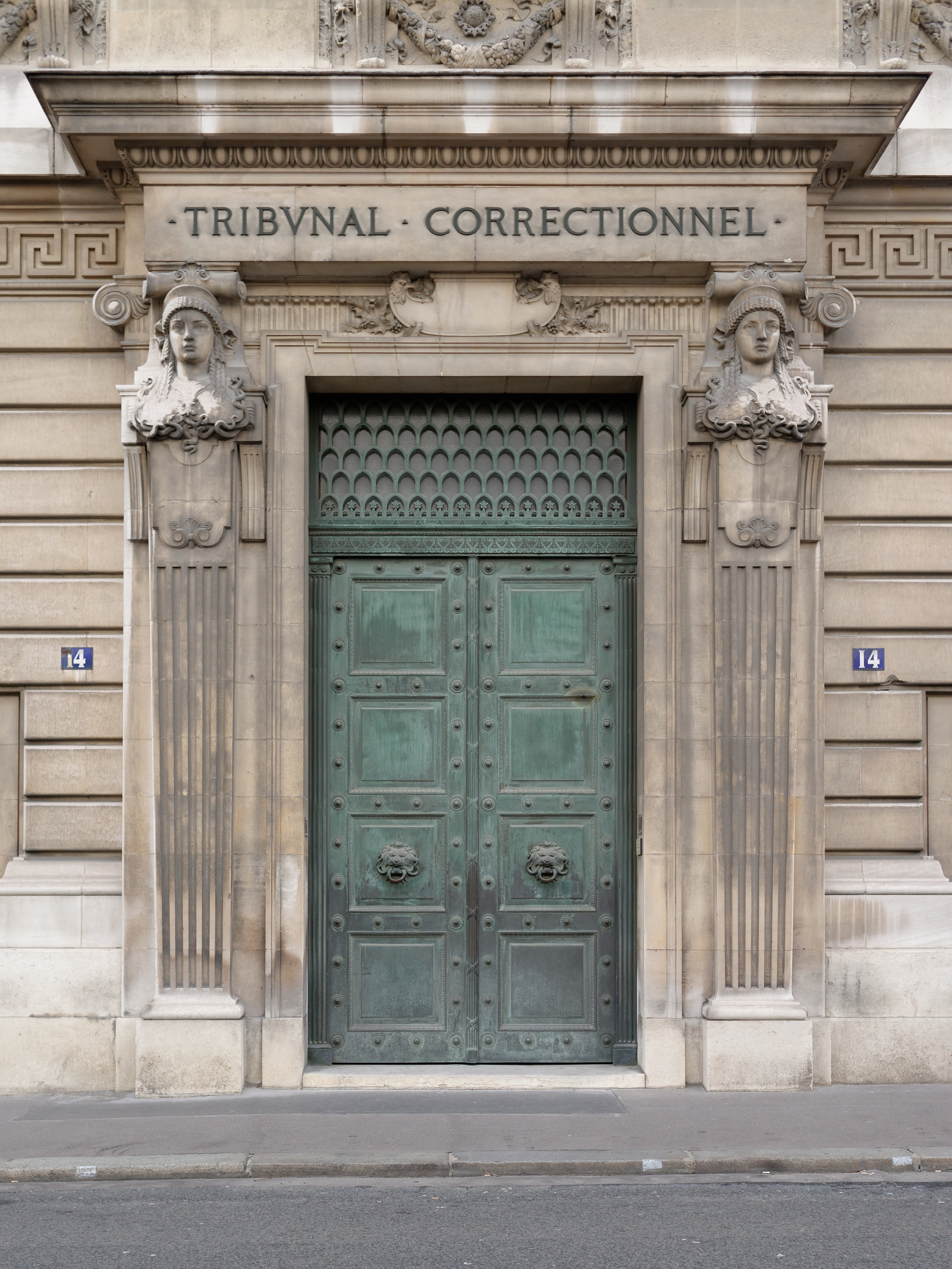
Entrance to Court of Corrections at 14 quai des Orfèvres (photo taken en 2006).

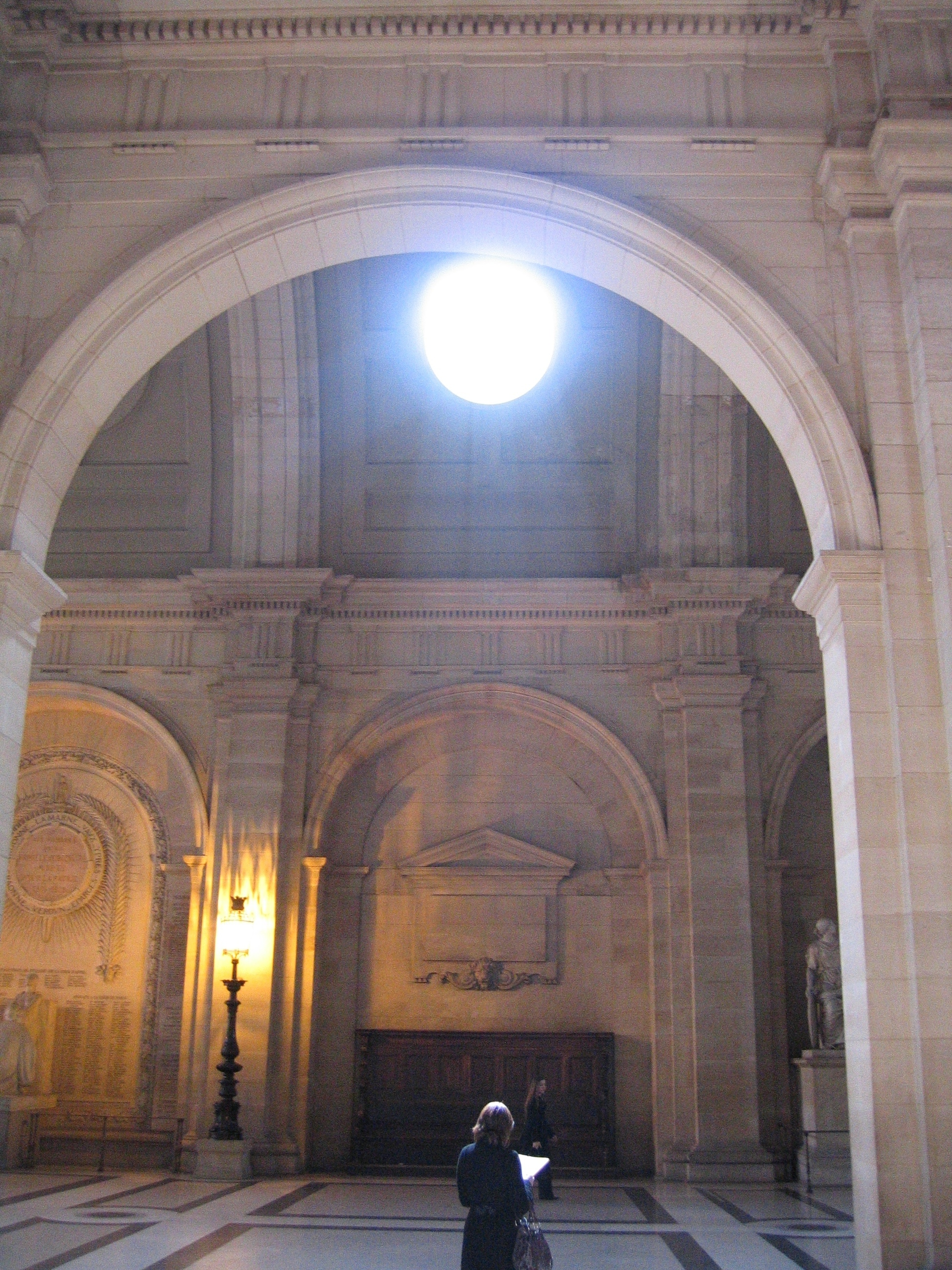
Salle des Pas-perdus (photo taken in 2012).

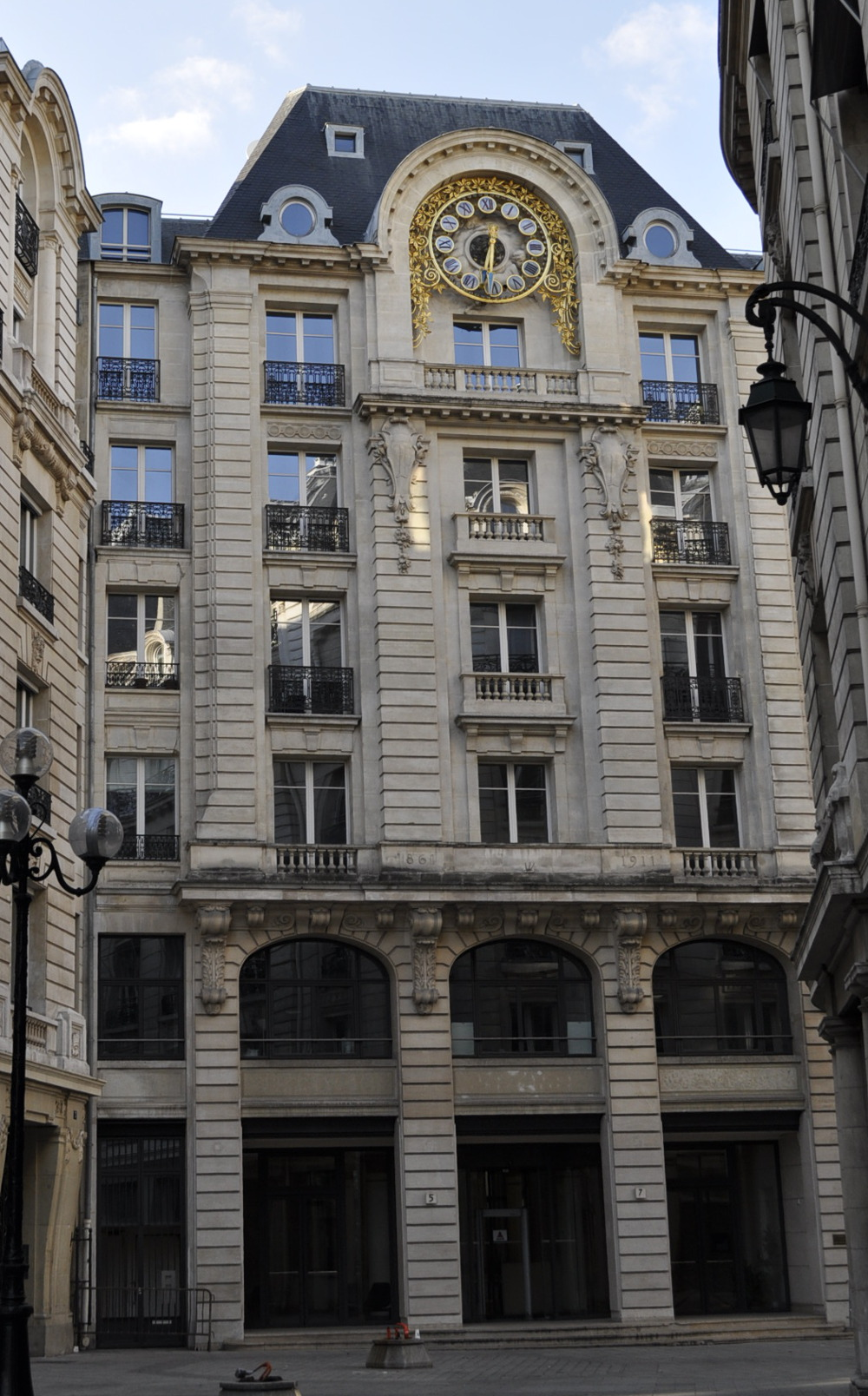
Financial and economic center and Public Health center at 5-7 rue des Italiens, Paris, since 1999 (photo taken in 2015).

== See also ==
- Court of Appeal
