= Paris Bar =

The Paris Bar is a French bistro in Charlottenburg, Berlin. It is popular with members of the city's arts and cultural communities.
