= Boualem Bensaïd =

Algerian terrorist

Boualem Bensaïd (Arabic: أبو عالم بن سعيد; born November 11, 1967 in Algiers) is an Algerian member of GIA, an Islamic terrorist organization. He has been accused of an attempted bombing during the 1995 terror campaign in France.

Born in Algeria in 1967, a sport teacher, he entered clandestinity around 1990. He went back to France in 1994, as Algeria was in full-scale civil war. In 1999, he was sentenced to 10 years of prison on charges of "association de malfaiteurs".

On 27 November 2003 he was sentenced in appeal to life detention, with a 22-year "safety sentence" (which prevents the detainee from being liberated for good conduct), on charges of having attempted to bomb the TGV Lyon-Paris on 26 August 1995. At the sentence, he exclaimed "God is great! Allah akbar! ("God is great!" in Arabic), it is a miserable decision!". The appeal court thus confirmed the judgement given by the First Special Criminal Court.

A prisoner since his arrest in 1995, Bensaïd is serving two more sentences of 10 years and 30 years for other charges related to the terrorist attacks of 1995.

== See also ==
- 1995 Islamist terror bombings in France
- Armed Islamic Group (GIA)
- Khaled Kelkal
