= Parachute Intervention Squadron of the National Gendarmerie =

French parachute-trained intervention squadron

- Escadron Parachutiste d'Intervention de la Gendarmerie Nationale (French)
- EPIGN patch
- Active: 1984–2007
- Country: France
- Agency: National Gendarmerie
- Type: Police tactical unit
- Role: Law enforcement Internal security Close protection Observation & Research
- Garrison: Satory, France
- Abbreviation: EPIGN

Structure
- Operators: 139

Notables
- Significant operation(s): Ouvéa cave crisis; Air France Flight 8969 assault; Numerous embassy protection missions

The Parachute Intervention Squadron of the National Gendarmerie (French: Escadron Parachutiste d'Intervention de la Gendarmerie Nationale, EPIGN) was a parachute-trained tactical unit of the French Gendarmerie. The squadron was formed in 1984 with personnel from EPGM, a one-of-a-kind parachute squadron that had been created within the mobile gendarmerie in 1971 and was disestablished at that date. EPIGN, was based in Versailles-Satory with its sister unit GIGN. Besides its primary mission of providing heavy support and reinforcement to GIGN, EPIGN soon developed its own set of missions in the fields of protection and observation. It was finally absorbed, together with the "old" GIGN, into the newly reorganized GIGN in September 2007.

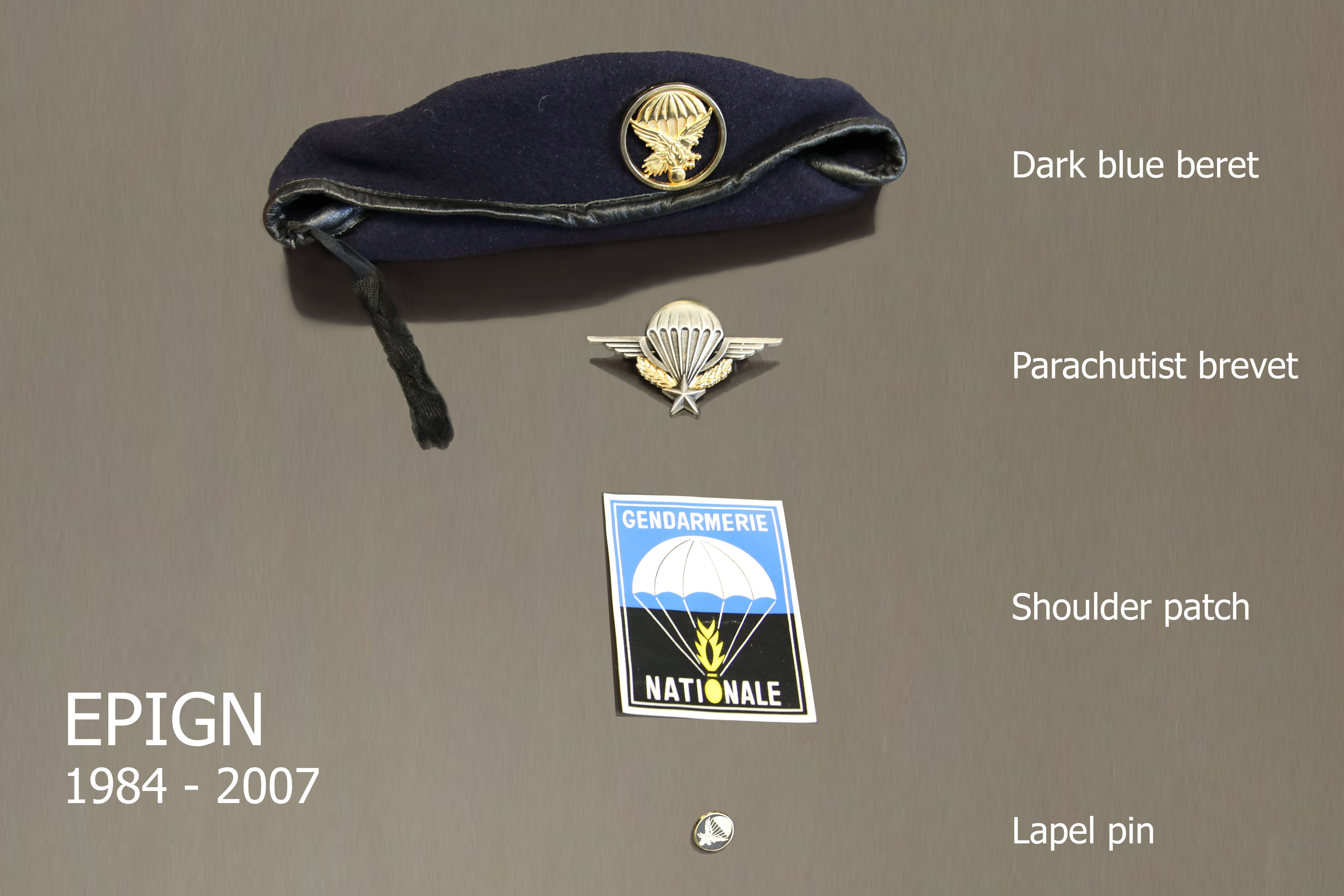
EPIGN beret, French parachutist badge, shoulder patch and lapel pin

== History ==
=== EPGM: The Mobile Gendarmerie Parachute squadron (1971–1983) ===
In 1971, the French Gendarmerie established a new mobile gendarmerie squadron in Mont-de-Marsan in southwest France: Escadron 9/11 parachutiste de la Gendarmerie mobile (EPGM). The squadron had a dual mission as a law and order unit specialized in "hard" situations and a parachute unit. One of the new unit's additional missions was to provide parachute-qualified provosts to the army's 11th airborne division.

In 1973, in the wake of the Munich massacre, the Gendarmerie created two tactical teams or "intervention units": one named ECRI (Équipe Commando Régionale d'intervention or Regional Commando Tactical Team) was based in Maisons-Alfort near Paris and a second, named GIGN (Groupe d'intervention de la Gendarmerie nationale) was created within the parachute squadron in Mont-de-Marsan. In 1974, the two units were renamed respectively GIGN 1 and GIGN 4. Then in 1976, both units merged into a single one, named GIGN and based in Maisons-Alfort while the parachute squadron remained in Mont-de-Marsan. GIGN relocated to Satory near Versailles (west of Paris) in 1982.

EPGM was involved in maintaining order during some of the most violent demonstrations of the 1980s which included protests against the building of new-generation nuclear plants. It was also deployed overseas to such places as Chad, the Central African Republic and Lebanon. The unit was also deployed to the French Territory of the Afars and the Issas to provide security for the 1977 referendum that led to the independence of Djibouti.

Besides being a qualified gendarme and paratrooper, every member of the unit had to have an additional specialty: high altitude jumper, sharpshooter, explosive neutralization specialist, close combat specialist, combat medic, loadmaster, driver, etc., the unit's structure remaining however that of a regular mobile gendarmerie squadron (i.e. one headquarters platoon and three line platoons) under the command of a captain. Being based near the Atlantic coast, the unit trained combat divers and this specialty was then acquired by GIGN4. This know-how was transferred to GIGN and further developed when the two units merged.

=== EPIGN: The National Gendarmerie Parachute Intervention Squadron (1984–2007) ===
In 1984, it was decided that EPGM (the gendarmerie mobile parachute squadron) would be disestablished and that its personnel would be transferred to Satory to create a new kind of parachute squadron there. The new unit, named escadron parachutiste d'intervention de la gendarmerie nationale or EPIGN would provide tactical support and reinforcements for GIGN whenever additional personnel or heavy weapons were needed.

That same year, GIGN and EPIGN became part of a larger organization called GSIGN (French: Groupement de sécurité et d'intervention de la Gendarmerie nationale).

== Missions and structure ==
As time passed, EPIGN, without ever giving up its primary mission of providing tactical support and reinforcements for GIGN, developed its own set of missions: surveillance and observation of criminals and terrorists, personal protection of VIPs and officials and protection of critical sites such as embassies in war-torn countries.

The unit structure also evolved as the mission scope evolved and very soon, had nothing left in common with that of a regular mobile gendarmerie squadron. In the end the unit, still under the command of a captain, was composed of:

- headquarters platoon – including a high altitude jump cell;
- two Security and Protection Platoons (SPP) French: sections de Sécurité Protection (SSP) specialized in close protection of VIPs or dangerous sites (for example embassies in war-torn countries);
- one Observation and Research Group (GOR) French: Groupe d'observations et de recherches (GOR) specialized in monitoring suspected criminals or terrorists.

Despite the squadron's name, the "intervention" mission was entirely transferred to GIGN, members of the parachute squadron being assigned the task to support the intervention group by sanitizing and cordoning off their operating area and by providing heavy weapon support with machine guns and mortars if and when necessary.

An additional mission was to reinforce GSPR (French: Groupe de Sécurité de la Présidence de la République), the presidential security group (then composed exclusively of gendarmes), mainly during official or state visits abroad.

Squadron personnel frequently conducted security audits of embassies, ports and airports and various French or foreign sites.

Finally the squadron was also involved during special events such as the Pope's visit, the World Football or Rugby World Cups, the D-Day commemoration, etc.

=== Uniform ===
EPIGN members often operated in plainclothes with a simple lapel pin (for example for VIP protection). When in uniform, they wore a dark blue beret, like their predecessors of EPGM.

== Skills ==
EPIGN personnel (and now GIGN personnel) was trained in:

- Alpinism (taught by the high-mountain gendarmerie group of Chamonix)
- Parachuting
- Diving
- First aid
- Marksmanship
- Explosive neutralization
- Close security
- Close combat

== Known operations ==
The unit was never deployed in a large scale parachute jump and a large part of the unit's missions were kept secret but known missions include:

- Embassy protection in war-torn countries or during crises (Afghanistan, Algeria, Colombia, Congo, Ethiopia, Iraq, Romania, Rwanda, El Salvador, Togo, Yemen, Democratic Republic of the Congo)
- Technical assistance and training missions in Burundi, Colombia, Union of the Comoros, Djibouti, Jordan, Republic of the Congo, Mali, Chad, Togo, etc.
- Reinforcement of the Presidential security group (GSPR) during visits to Jordan, Egypt, the Republic of Ireland, etc.
- GIGN support during the assault on the Ouvéa cave. An EPIGN section led the assault group through the jungle and cordoned off the area. An EPIGN member was wounded by gunshot when the hostage takers shot at their helicopter at the beginning of the assault.
- GIGN support (and hostage rescue) during the assault on Air France Flight 8969 at Marseille Marignane airport in December 1994. A section of eighteen EPIGN members was stationed directly underneath the plane during the assault and recovered the hostages as they went down the escape chutes. As only four armored jackets were available due to the urgency of the deployment, they decided that none would be used.
- Attempted arrest, and shooting, of terrorist Khaled Kelkal in 1995. As GIGN was deployed in the Comoros, EPIGN undertook the operation. Kelkal refused to surrender and was shot in the ensuing exchange.
- Search for and monitoring of suspected criminals after the end of the Yugoslav Wars.
- Search for and monitoring of violent independentist activists (Corsica, Basque Country) or terrorists (Action Directe).

=== EPGM and EPIGN unit commanders ===
EPGM (1971–1983)

- Capitaine Poupinot
- Capitaine Michel
- Capitaine Rémy
- Capitaine Denis
- Capitaine Vanderperre

EPIGN (1984–2007)

- Capitaine Chancerelle
- Capitaine Pattin
- Capitaine Cormier
- Capitaine Strub
- Capitaine Bonneau
- Capitaine Veneau
- Capitaine Lavergne
- Capitaine L.

== Dissolution ==
In 2007, the Gendarmerie, in light of mass terrorists events such as the Moscow theater hostage crisis and the Beslan school siege and in order to better integrate its tactical teams under reinforced headquarters, decided to disestablish GSIGN in favor of a "new" GIGN composed of the former GIGN, the former EPIGN and other former components of GSIGN (the Presidential close protection group and the training group). So EPIGN was disestablished and its former members became part of "forces" in the new GIGN (mainly the Security Protection Force and the Observation and Research Force).

== Bibliography ==
- Betry, Alain (2001). L'Escadron parachutiste d'intervention de la gendarmerie nationale (in French). Atlante Editions. ISBN 2-912671-14-0.
- Tanguy, Jean-Marc (2017). Missions Extrêmes – Le GIGN et l'EPIGN en opération 1976–2017 (in French). Histoire et Collections. ISBN 978-2-35250-488-7.
- Collective (2006). Encyclopédie de la Gendarmerie Nationale, tome III (in French). éditions SPE Barthelemy, Paris. ISBN 2-912838-21-5.
- Collective (2006). Histoire de la gendarmerie mobile d'Ile-de-France, 3 volumes, tome II (in French). éditions SPE Barthelemy, Paris. ISBN 2-912838-31-2.

== See also ==
- Groupe d'Intervention de la Gendarmerie Nationale
- 11th Shock Parachutist Regiment
- Carabinieri Regiment "Tuscania" a similar unit of Carabinieri

== Related links ==
- (in Spanish) Specwarnet.com report
