= El Ogla, Tébessa =

Coordinates: 35°11′19″N 7°28′08″E

El Ogla
- Commune and town
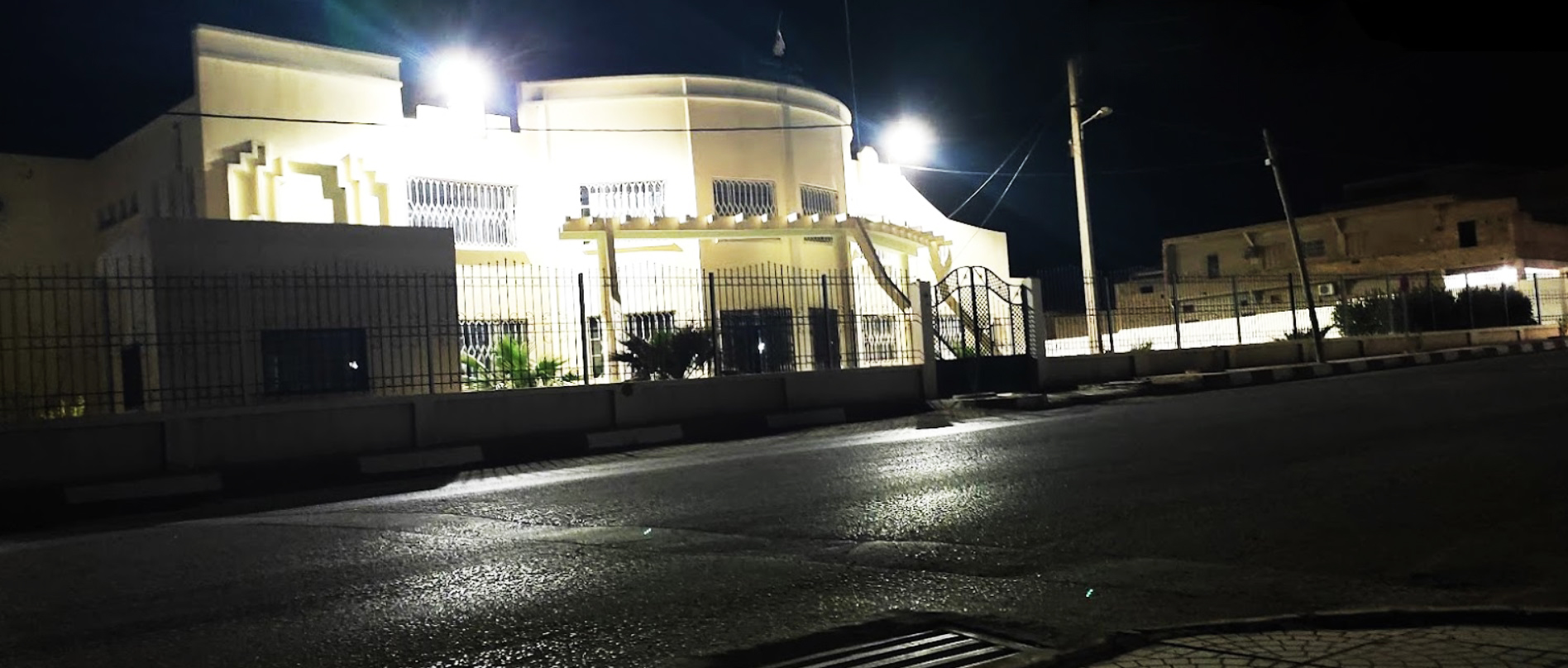
- El Ogla municipality headquarters in 2024

- Country: Algeria
- Province: Tébessa Province
- Time zone: UTC+1 (CET)

El Ogla (Arabic: العقلة; Berber languages: ⴰⵍⵄⵇⵍⴰ) is a town and commune in Tébessa Province in north-eastern Algeria.
