= Saint-Michel–Notre-Dame station =

Railway station on the Paris RER

Saint-Michel Notre-Dame
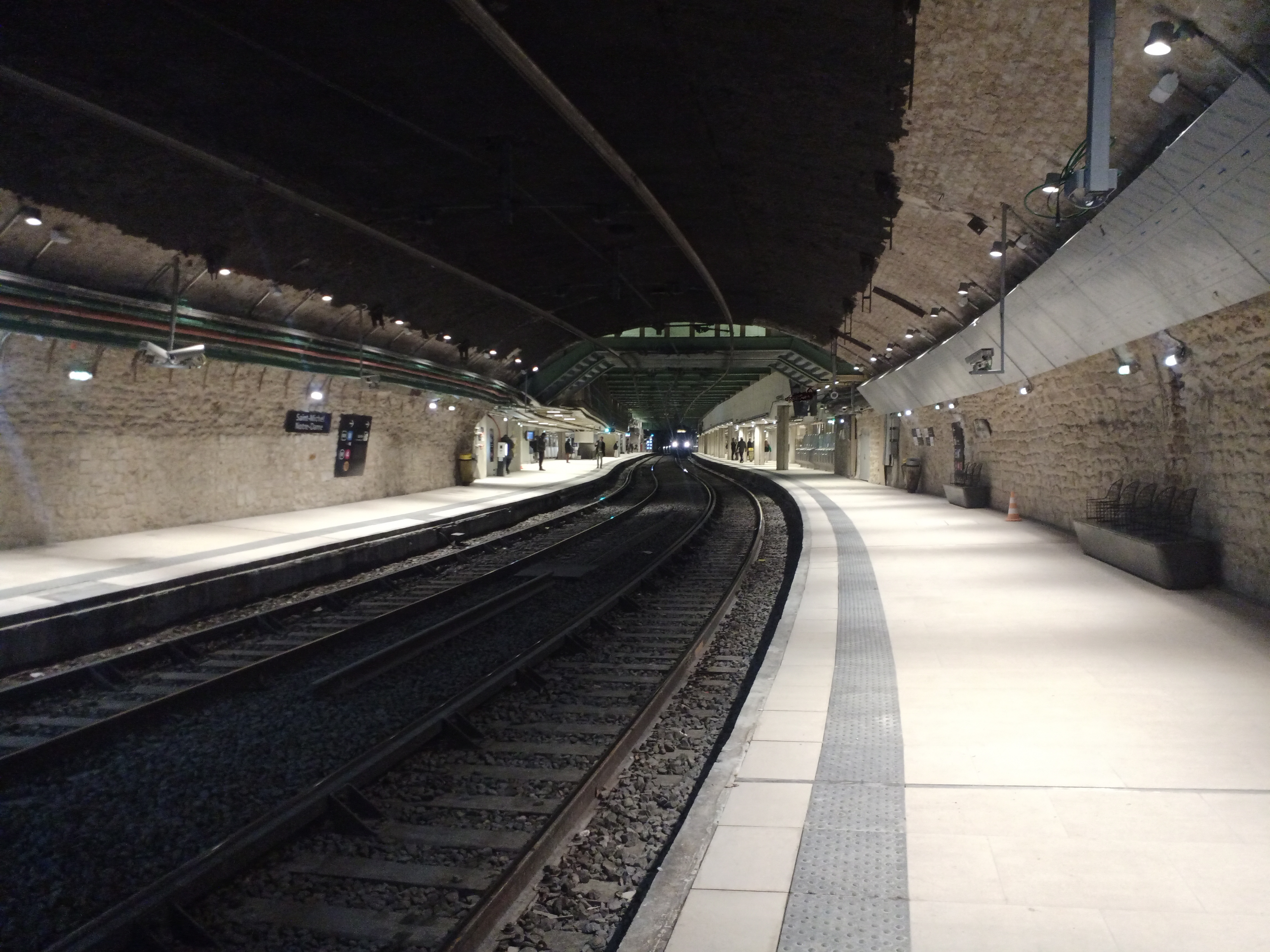
- Saint-Michel–Notre-Dame station RER C platforms

General information
- Location: France
- Coordinates: 48°51′13″N 2°20′39″E
- Operator: RER B: RATP Group; RER C: SNCF
- Platforms: RER B: 1 island platform; RER C: 2 side platforms
- Tracks: 4 (2 each)
Connections
- Paris Metro	(at Saint-Michel) (at Cluny–La Sorbonne)
- RATP Bus: 21 27 38 58 63 70 75 86 87 96
- Tootbus Paris
- Noctilien: N12 N13 N14 N15 N21 N22 N122

Construction
- Structure type: Underground
- Platform levels: 2
- Accessible: RER B: Yes, by request to staff; RER C: No

Other information
- Station code: RER B: 87785436; RER C: 87547315
- Fare zone: 1

History
- Opened: 1900
- Former names: Pont Saint-Michel

Passengers
- 2024: 26,713,257

Services
Preceding station	RER	Following station
Châtelet–Les Halles towards Aéroport Charles de Gaulle 2 TGV or Mitry–Claye	RER B	Luxembourg towards Robinson or Saint-Rémy-lès-Chevreuse
Musée d'Orsay towards Pontoise, Versailles Château Rive Gauche or Saint-Quentin-en-Yvelines	RER C	Gare d'Austerlitz towards Massy-Palaiseau, Dourdan-la-Forêt or Saint-Martin-d'Étampes
Location

Saint-Michel–Notre-Dame (French pronunciation: [sɛ̃ miʃɛl nɔtʁ(ə) dam]) is a station on line B and line C of the Réseau Express Régional (RER) in Paris. Located in the 5th arrondissement, the station is named after the nearby Saint-Michel area and Notre-Dame Cathedral. The station opened, as Pont Saint-Michel and with platforms on the line that is now RER line C, in 1900. It gained its current name in 1988 with the opening of the line B platforms.

== Location ==
The main entrance to the station is in Place Saint-Michel on the Rive Gauche of the Seine. There is also a satellite entrance to the line B platforms on Place Notre-Dame, which is on the Île de la Cité across the Seine from Place Saint-Michel.

The line C platforms run parallel to the Seine at just above river level and are provided by natural light through 28 large windows that are designed to withstand flooding from the river. The line B platforms pass underneath the Seine and are at right-angles under the RER C platforms.

The station is linked by underground passageways to the Saint-Michel and Cluny–La Sorbonne stations of the Paris Metro. Saint-Michel is on Metro Line 4 and Cluny–La Sorbonne is on Metro Line 10.

== History ==
The RER C section of the station dates back to 1900, when it opened as the Pont Saint-Michel station on the extension of the Compagnie du chemin de fer de Paris à Orléans from the Gare d'Austerlitz to a new terminus at the Gare d'Orsay. The Pont Saint-Michel station was built under the quays of the Seine, almost at river level, and its constrained location, with narrow and low platforms and reverse curves, affects operations to this day. Originally the platforms were lit by openings in the river bank, but these were filled in after the station was inundated during the Seine floods of 1910.

In September 1979, a 1 kilometre (0.62 mi) tunnel was constructed to link the Gare d'Orsay (now the Musée d'Orsay) to Invalides thus creating a cross-city line initially called the Transversal Rive Gauche. At the same time, the Pont Saint-Michel station was slightly widened. In May 1980, the Transversal Rive Gauche became the core part of the new RER C.

The RER B passed under Saint-Michel starting December 1977, but the interchange was delayed by the location under the quays and the continued operation of the Z 23000 trains on the line: the trains had to climb a 4.08% gradient from Luxembourg to Châtelet–Les Halles, and could only do that without stopping at Saint-Michel. The RER B platforms finally opened in February 1988, one year after the withdrawal of the Z 23000, and the station was renamed to Saint-Michel–Notre-Dame. At the same time, Cluny–La Sorbonne station on the metro, which had closed in 1939, was reopened to connect with the new RER station and give access to Boulevard Saint-Germain.

On 25 July 1995, as part of a campaign of terror bombings conducted by the Armed Islamic Group of Algeria, the station was the target of an attack, with a gas bottle exploding near one of the line B platforms, killing eight and wounding 100 people critically. This attack would mark the first of many in 1995 and is commemorated with a discrete memorial inside the platform.

In August 2022, the line C platforms were closed for modernisation. Originally intended to be complete by December of the same year, the platforms eventually reopened in April 2023. The principal improvement was the reinstatement of natural lighting by replacing the original openings, closed in 1910, with 28 large windows that are designed to withstand flooding. Other improvements were the provision of improved ventilation and escalator access.

== Gallery ==
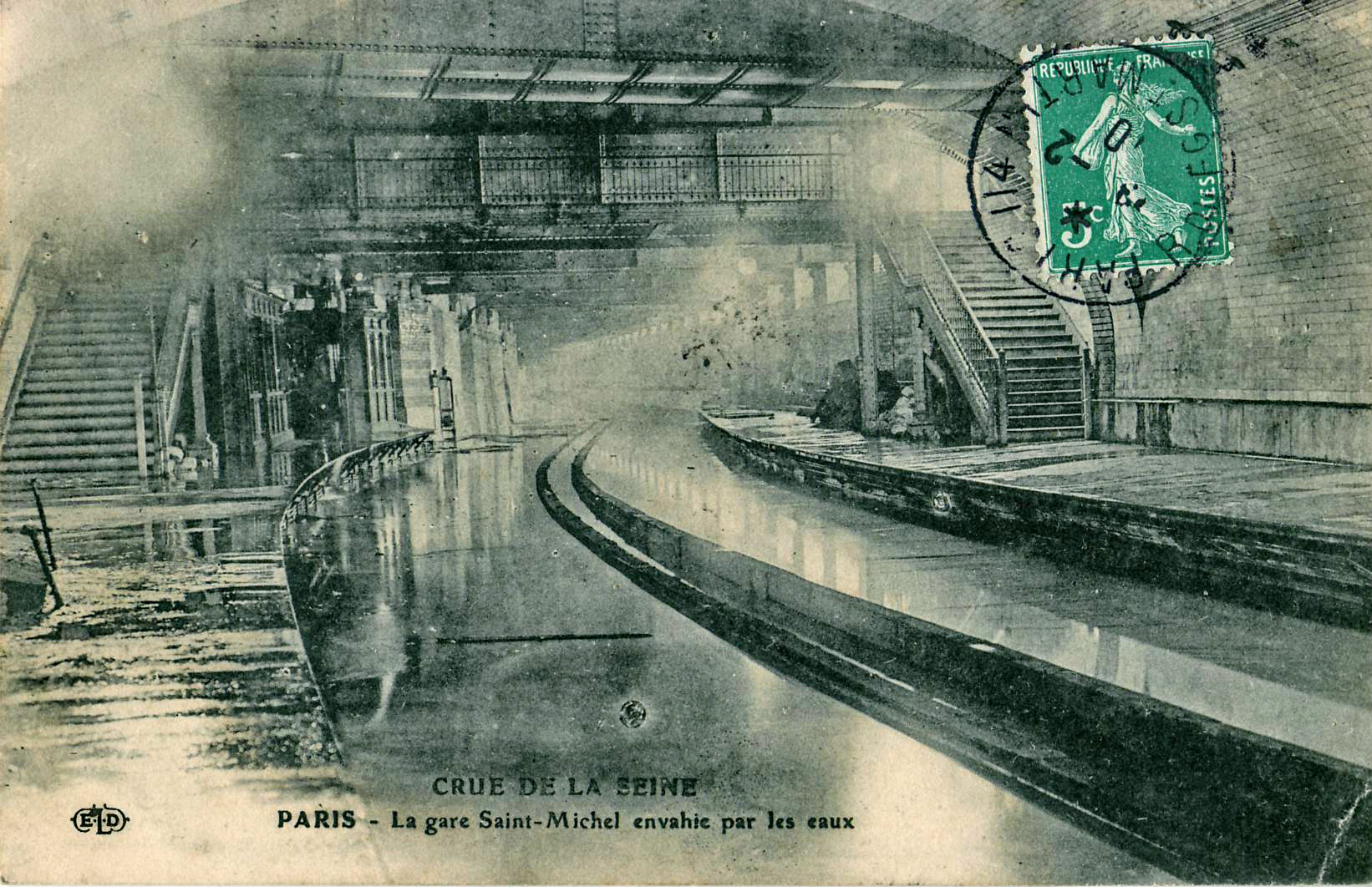
The station during the 1910 flood

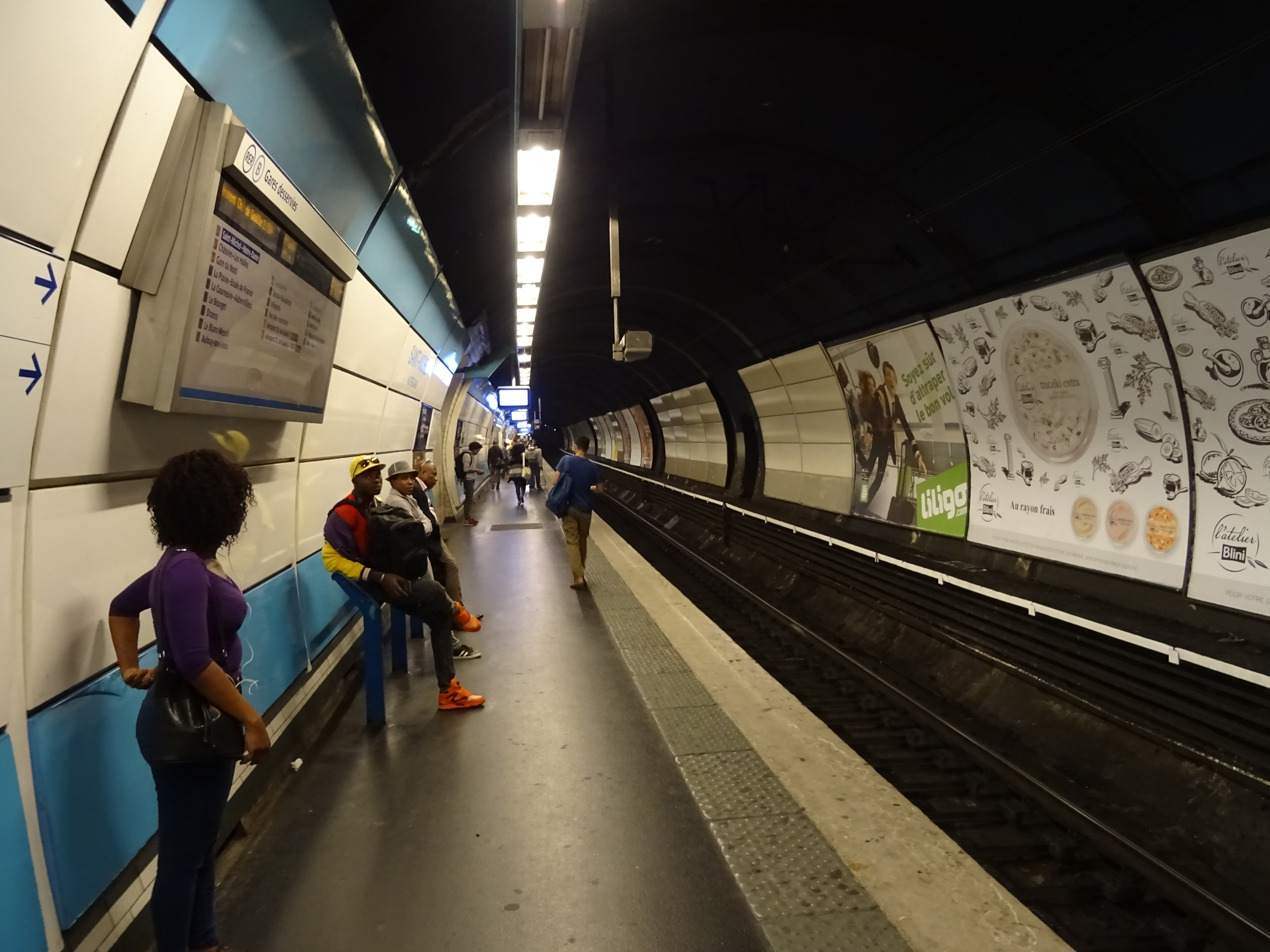
One of two line B platforms

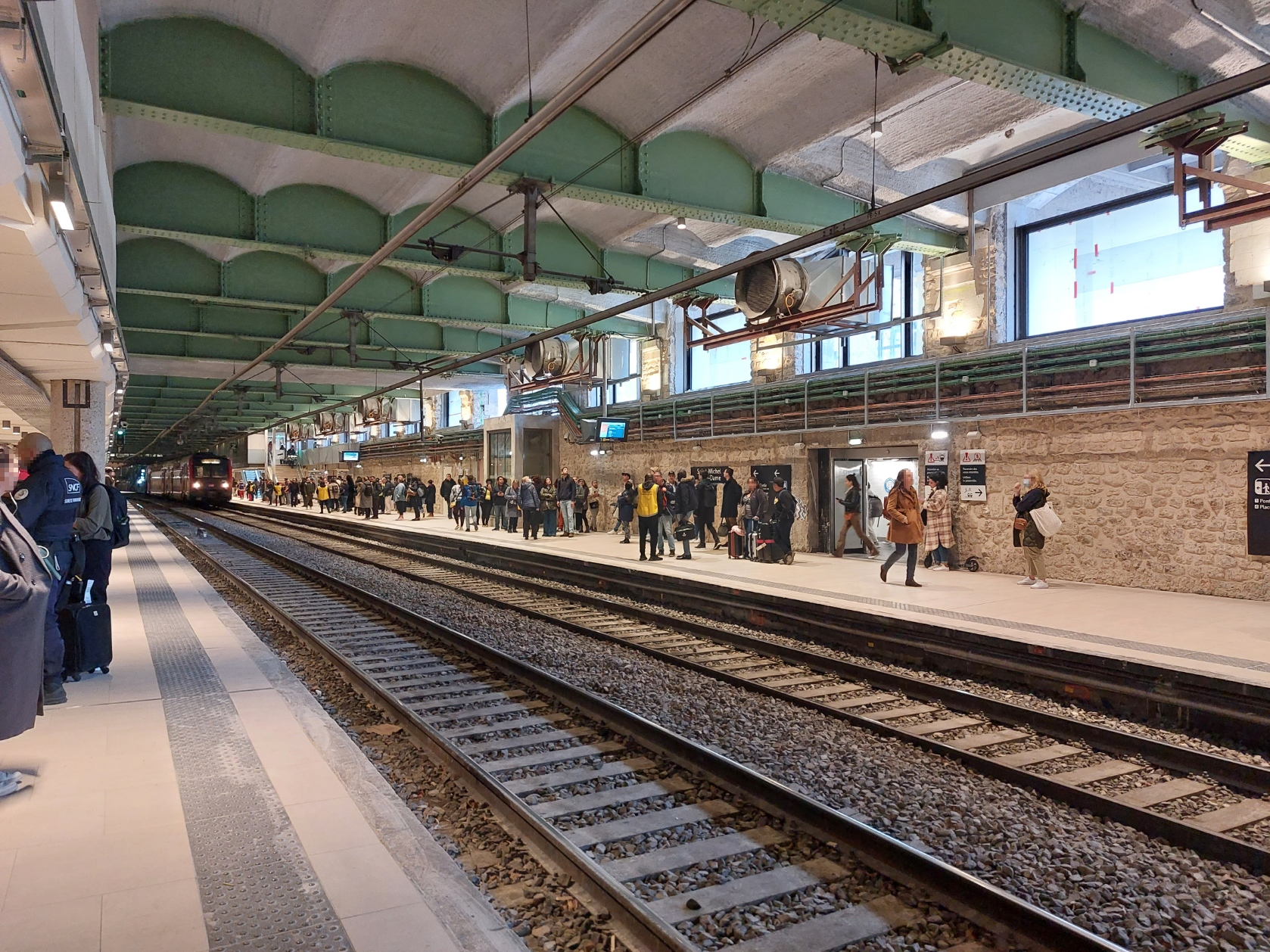
Line C platforms after 2023 modernisation

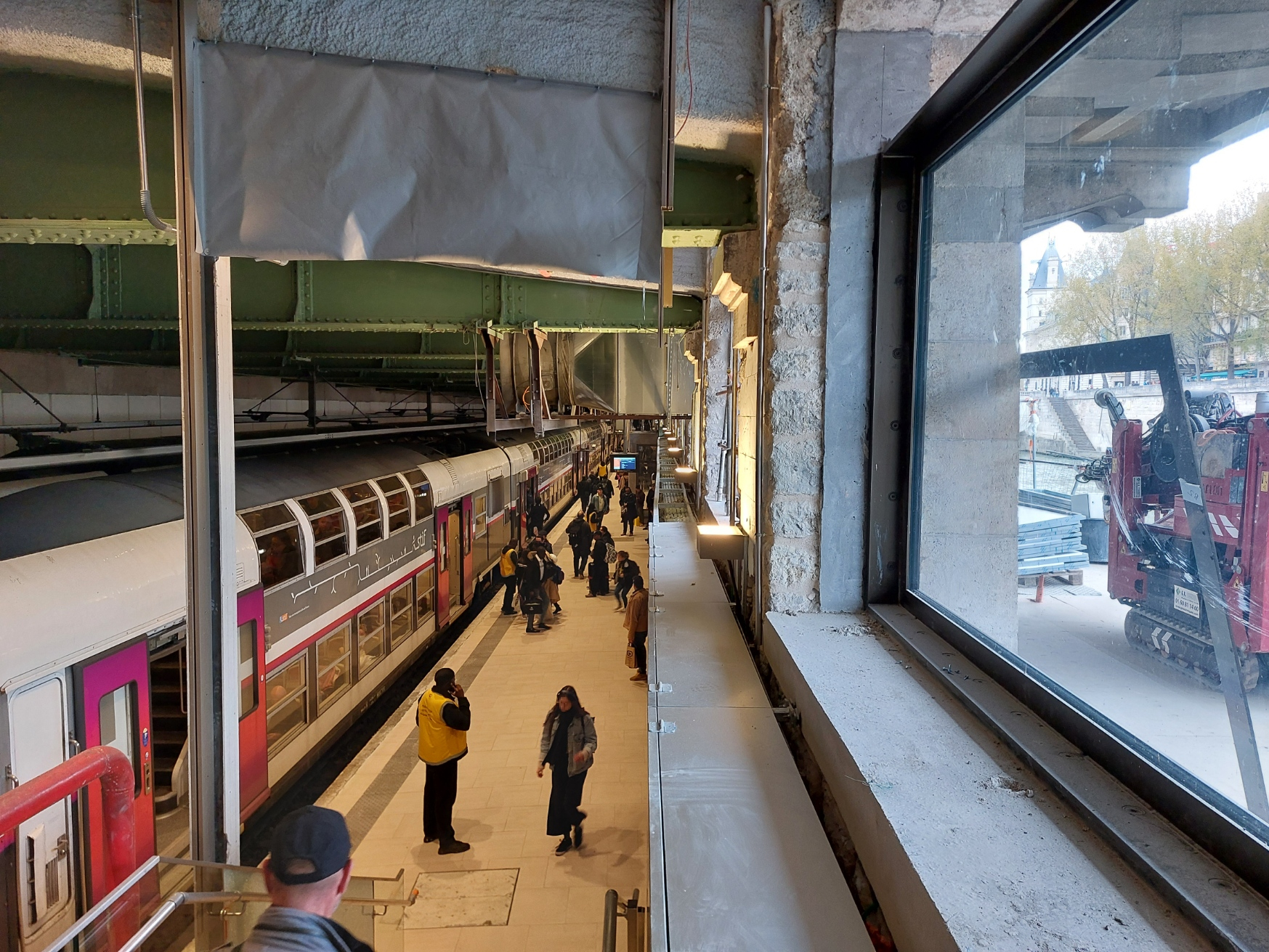
Close-up of new window fitted in 2023

== Historical services ==
Dates	Company or line	Preceding station	Following station
1900–1937	Chemin de fer de Paris à Orléans; Paris–Bordeaux railway	Gare d'Orsay	Gare d'Austerlitz

== See also ==
- List of stations of the Paris RER
