= Law enforcement in Algeria =

Armée nationale populaire (ANP) Directorate General for National Security (DGSN or Sûreté Nationale) Gendarmerie Nationale

Agency overview
- Formed: 1962 (Armée nationale populaire) 1962 (Sûreté Nationale and Gendarmerie Nationale)
- Employees: 130,000 (Military) 178,000 (Paramilitary)

Jurisdictional structure
- Operations jurisdiction: Algeria
- Governing body: Algerian Government

Operational structure
- Overseen by: Ministry of the Interior (Sûreté Nationale); Ministry of Defence (Gendarmerie Nationale); People's National Army

Authority and management of civil law and order in Algeria is shared by the Sûreté Nationale, or Directorate General for National Security (DGSN), the national civilian police force, under the Ministry of Interior, and the Gendarmerie Nationale under the Ministry of National Defence.

The Sûreté Nationale is primarily responsible for cities and large urban areas, performing routine policing duties in upholding Algerian law. Alternatively, The National Gendarmerie's primary function is to maintain law and order and dispense police services to rural areas.

There are also 94,000 Municipal Guards whose primary duty is to protect the villages and act as an auxiliary force of the law enforcement. During the Algerian Civil War, the Guards were the primary targets of the terrorists (Armed opposition), with 4,000 Guards killed in action since 1994.

Algerian law enforcement plays a notable role under service of the People's Democratic Republic of Algeria, both acting as an internal security force for the country. Under the regulation of the government, all types of law enforcement within Algeria have primary objectives in upholding law and order, territorial integrity, internal security and regional security for the nation. Algeria's various security forces have been involved in counter-terrorism operations and have been accused of breaches of Human rights and excesses in the battle against Islamist groups. They also face complaints of harassing journalists.

== History ==
Up until 1962, Algeria had remained under colonial ties to French rule. Due to these relations, French saw the conscription of Algerian soldiers into World War One. Algerian soldier conscription during World War One was approximately 173,000. Algerian soldiers joined French forces with the Triple Entente Alliance, battling across Europe. Resultant from France's battle with opposing Triple Alliance forces, 25,000 of the 173,000 Algerian soldiers died during conflict. Algeria continued to supply soldiers to France during World War Two, enforced by colonial ties. French conscription in both World War One and World War Two contributed to a growth in protest towards French presence in Algeria, with growing tensions leading to an eight-year war between France and Algeria in a struggle for colonial.

For eight years, from 1954 to 1962, Algerian military forces struggled against French colonists in a fight to gain independence. Initially founded in 1954, the Front de Liberation Nationale (FLN) acted as a rigid military force for Algeria, primarily using guerrilla warfare tactics, sabotage and occasional ambushes. Major objectives of the FLN were to establish a front against the struggle of independence, while also organising the small militant population instead of a constant, un-focused struggle against the French. The FLN's armed wing during the war, called the Armée de libération nationale, or National Liberation Army (ALN) had begun to establish structure and authority by 1956. Following a meeting by the FLN in August 1956, the FLN had established formal ranks, a code of conduct and leadership structures. It was not until after the end of the war in 1962, that the ALN was restructured to the People's National Army.

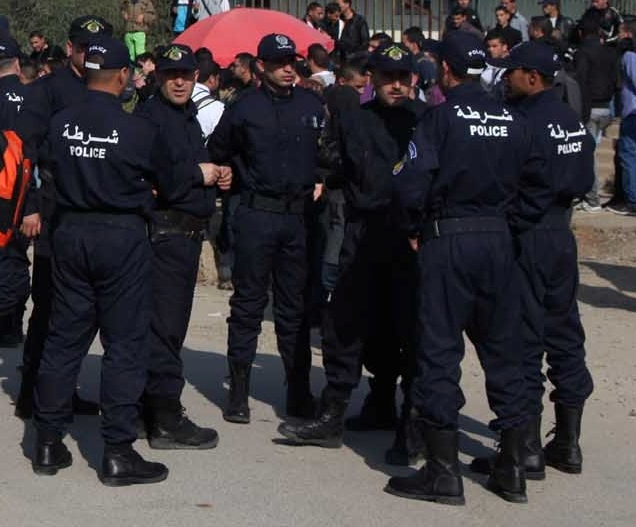
Sûreté Nationale police in uniform.

During the war of independence, discussion between President Ahemd Ben Bella and Minister of Defence, Houari Boumediene led to the Establishment of the ANP in 1962, a professional military establishment with the objectives of improving external security. The People's National Army (Armée nationale populaire or ANP) was established under the Democratic Republic of Algeria, consistent of three main military branches; the army, air force and navy. Development of internal security measures were improved through the development of the Sûreté Nationale and Gendarmerie Nationale in 1962, operating to maintain law and order as the civil police force.

At the time of independence, the Algerian army emerged as the only efficient powerbroker, prevalent to a country with limited economic and political infrastructure. Between independence of 1962 and the 1988 October riots, Algeria was led as a one-party state, with power shackles vested by the military and security groups. Ironically, democratic groups frequently relied on the army to intervene within the political environment in support of favourable outcomes. Subsequently, most Algerian presidents have been military officers, each maintaining close relations or positions in the army up until presidency of Abdelaziz Bouteflika in 2018.

Following an increase in social dissatisfaction from 1986, several riots occurred, growing until students and labour forces culminated in 1988. Forces grouped together, the general strike on October 5 of 1988, now known as the October Riots, were originally suppressed by civil police, but in escalation brought the attention of the Algerian army. Attempting to contain the demonstration, army recruits fired point-blank at protestors, killing at least 200 in angering the social atmosphere and increasing unrest.

Proceeding the events of the October riots, Algerian government saw a significant increase in civil unrest and protest towards the political and economic environment. To ease tension, the military was compelled to open the political system in allowing for multiple party elections. In December 1991, the Islamic Salvation Front (FIS), an Algeria political party, proved to be popular in winning the democratic votes. Still an immense power within the political atmosphere, the Algerian military, encouraged by France, the US and other western powers, interjected and cancelled the election results. Following the pre-emptive actions of the military, the reaction saw a civil war break out over the next decade, costing more than 150,000 lives between law enforcement and opposing forces.

Modern attitudes towards Algerian law enforcement have led to an ongoing attempt in making the armed forces more professional, reflected in a 6-month reduction of conscription liability to 12 months, as of 2014. As of 2018, military activities are predominant in discussion of regional security challenges with neighbouring countries, such as counter terrorism. Algeria continues to operate a close security cooperation with Tunisia in maintaining the security rationale of the region.

== Types of Law Enforcement ==
=== Policing ===
Responsibility for maintaining internal law and order is shared between the Sûreté Nationale and Gendarmerie Nationale. Both groups act as Algeria's primary law enforcement for internal security, performing routine policing work and regular internal security functions.

The Sûreté Nationale is Algeria's primary policing authority in major cities and urban areas. Administrated by the Algerian Ministry of Interior, the Sûreté Nationale is conducted with maintaining law and order, conducting criminal investigations, combating terrorism and organised crime, protecting life and property and apprehending offenders. In addition, it performs regular policing functions including traffic control. As of 2018, the Sûreté Nationale consists of 16,000 members and are primarily armed with small firearms.

The Gendarmerie Nationale serves as Algeria's main rural police force. Administered by the Ministry of Defence, the Gendarmerie is responsible for maintaining law and order in towns, villages and rural areas, providing authority and surveillance to local civilians. Additionally, the Gendarmerie acts to represent government control over remote regions and work closely with customs at border points to enforce import laws and regulations. Asides from regulatory policing, the Nationale Gendarmerie has further played a significant role in internal security to combat terrorism and organised crime. As of 2018, the Gendarmerie Nationale has a force of 20,000 members, sporting weapons, vehicles and air support of varying nature.

=== Military ===
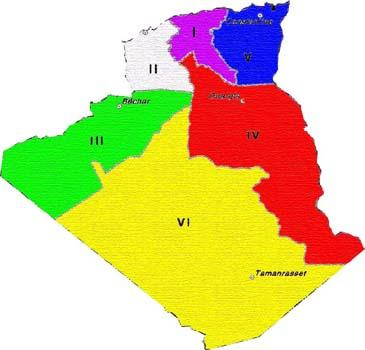
The six military regions of Algeria

The People's National Army (Armée nationale populaire or ANP) operates as Algeria's professional military organisation. Established in 1962, the ANP operates in six military regions, subdivided into zones, areas and sectors. The ANP manages three main branches; the army, air force and navy, with the goal of maintaining Algeria's external security and management of diverse internal conflicts. Under the Algerian constitution, the president maintains supreme commander over all armed forces, devoted to national defence in resolution of internal and external conflicts.

The army operates as Algeria's largest and most developed branch of the ANP, split into multiple infantry units across 110,000 members, of which 75,000 are conscripted. The army operates between Algeria's six numbered military regions, each with headquarters at located in major cities. Regional commanders of army, air force and naval forces report directly to the Ministry of National Defence in operation of defence of respective regions.

The Algerian air force has responsibility for defending the country's air space, supporting ground forces, carrying out land and maritime reconnaissance and supplying military transportation and cargo airlift. As of 2018, the Air Force has enrolled 14,000 members.

The Algerian navy operates with the goal of preventing smuggling, illegal entry of undesirable aliens and other offences to assure Algeria's security of coastal areas. Additionally, the Navy carries out routine coast guard duties and operates a large naval fleet across its 6000 members.

==== Conditions of service ====
Conditions of service for the People's National Army are recognised to be of higher standard relative to conditions found in the civilian sector. Following independence in 1962, the Algerian government believed that loyalty and morality of the armed forces were key to maintaining its stability in a time ridden by social, economic and political instability. Most military personnel operate under favourable employment conditions, with higher than average food and pay, further featuring advantages of medical care, retirement benefits, and post-retirement skills training when transitioning into the civilian sector.

=== Justice System ===
In addition to Algeria's law enforces, a criminal justice and prison system is in existence to adhere law offenders. Ordinary criminal cases are denoted in a regular civil court system by judges appointed by the Ministry of Justice, arranged by an independent board. Series crimes are heard in provincial courts, in addition with lower courts held in local tribunals, accounting less serious offences. Extending the justice system, Algeria operates a prison system as a separate function of the Ministry of Justice, supporting law enforcement and punishment against offenders.

=== Intelligence Agencies ===
In addition to the police and military, Algerian law enforcement operates several Intelligence agencies to further maintain internal security and external threats. Military security remains responsible to the Algerian Government, in the monitoring and maintenance of data sources and files relevant to potential sources of opposition to national leadership. Although the role of and legal restrictions of intelligence agencies may be assumed to match those of the Sûreté and gendarmerie police forces, precise details of their function have remained fluid. Intelligence agencies are detailed to have activities in infiltrating Islamist groups and other relevant political opposition, maintaining a payroll of information sources in monitoring opposition movements and the operating of extensive telephone surveillance. Known intelligence groups include an Anti-Terrorist operation, the Coordinating Directorate of Territorial Security, and a group under the High Council of State operating with political and security matters.

== Sourcing of Equipment ==
“Algeria’s armed forces are among some of the most capable and best equipped in North Africa”. Algerian army and air force inventories consist of a modern component, primarily sourced equipment through Russia and China. While Algeria continues to be largely dependent on sources its equipment by foreign suppliers, significant funding has been directed towards developing domestic defence industry with aim of providing a more self-sustaining supply for Algeria (as of 2019).

== Uniform and Equipment ==
Uniforms, the issuing of firearms, vehicles and other equipment vary between the separate branches of internal and external law enforcement.

=== Military ===
The Algerian army service uniform consists of an olive drab shade, featuring a similar style to the uniform worn by the United States Army. Algerian Air force troops have uniforms of a pale blue colour and navy uniforms of a darker blue. All sub-sections of the army feature a variation between summer, winter and dress uniforms, and feature camouflage styling across summer and winter uniforms.

Rank insignia for a Général d'armée, highest rank in Algeria Military.

The Rank insignia for the People's National Army is worn across shoulder straps by officers and enlisted members of all services within the Algerian military. Featuring similar designs to the French military, titles variate between each sub-branch of the military, each with a unique design in respect to rank.

As of 2019, the Algerian military maintains a force of 130,000 active personnel, 1,467 active main battle tanks and 111 tactical combat aircraft fleets. The Algerian army equipment ranges consists of several armoured, engineering & maintenance vehicles, anti-tank, artillery, surface-to-surface missile launchers and air defence models across its six military regions. The Algerian Navy maintains a variety of submarines, vessel fleets, mine and anti-mine warfare countermeasures and landing ships to operate across the country's coastal regions. The Algerian air force maintains a range of attack, transport and training helicopters, air defence and air-launched missiles, unmanned aerial vehicles and armoured fighting vehicles.

=== Policing ===
The Gendarmerie Nationale equipment includes various transport, patrol, armoured vehicles and light weaponry. In addition to a variety of vehicle transportation and light weaponry, the Sûreté Nationale contains a special riot police force to assist with extensive civil unrest, featuring modern-riot control-gear. The Gendarmerie Nationale uses a pale green uniform, while the Sûreté Nationale features dark navy colouring. Both police forces primarily use small arm weaponry.

== See also ==
- Garde communale
