= List of armed groups in the Algerian Civil War =

This article is a list of armed groups involved in the Algerian Civil War (1992 - 2002). The civil war between the Algerian government and various Islamist rebel groups took place from 11 January 1992 - after a coup overturned an assumed Islamist electoral victory - until 8 February 2002. Initially, the government assumed to have suppressed the Islamist movement, but armed groups soon emerged, declaring jihad. By 1994, the violence had escalated to a point where the government's ability to maintain control appeared uncertain. By 1996–97, the Islamist resistance had visibly lost popular support, though clashes continued for several more years.

== Algerian Civil War ==
People's Democratic Republic of Algeria and allies	Islamist Opposition	Salafi Jihadist Opposition
Algerian People's National Army; Algerian Land Forces; Algerian National Navy; Algerian Air Force; Algerian Territorial Air Defence Forces; Republican Guard; National Gendarmerie; Garde Communale; Patriots Militia; Department of Intelligence and Security; Organisation of Young Free Algerians; Directorate General for National Security; Foreign Support: Egypt; Tunisia; European Union; France; South Africa	Islamic Salvation Front; Islamic Salvation Army (dissolved 2000); Foreign Support: Libya (until 1995); Morocco (alleged); Iran (alleged); Saudi Arabia (pre-war); (Saudi Arabia) Saudi private donors	Armed Islamic Group of Algeria Allies: Islamic Armed Movement (1992-1994); Islamic Front for Armed Jihad (1993-1996); Islamic State Movement; Foreign Support: Sudan (alleged); Iran (alleged); Egyptian Islamic Jihad (until 1995); Al-Qaeda; Salafist Group for Preaching and Combat; Smaller Groups: Takfir wal-Hijra; Islamic Movement for Preaching and Jihad (1996-?); Islamic League for Da'wa and Jihad
