= Eliminationism =

Political ideology

Eliminationism is a political ideology that views a group within a larger social group as harmful and therefore believes it must be eliminated—by separation, censorship, or extermination—for the benefit of the larger group and in order to preserve its "purity."

The various forms of eliminationism have included attempts to delete or change the cultural identity of the targeted group, the political disenfranchisement of the group, the creation of ghettos for the group, the enslavement of the group, the segregation of the group, the voter suppression of the group, various forms of apartheid targeting the group, the deportation of the group, various methods of forced removal and forced marches targeting the group, the creation of concentration camps for the group, the forced sterilization of the group, anti-miscegenation laws targeting the group, the systematic rape of the group, mass murder campaigns targeting the group, and the attempted genocide of the group.

== Etymology ==
The term eliminationism was made popular by American political scientist Daniel Goldhagen in his 1996 book Hitler's Willing Executioners: Ordinary Germans and the Holocaust, in which he posits that the German public not only knew about, but supported, the Holocaust because of a unique and virulent "eliminationist antisemitism" within the German national identity, which had developed in the preceding centuries.

== Types ==
The purpose of defining eliminationism is the inherent weakness of the term "genocide", which only allows for action where mass slaughter has already occurred. However, according to Goldhagen, extermination is usually seen as one (and the most extreme) option of getting rid of an unwanted people group seen as a threat, and in any case of extermination many of the other methods of eliminationism will also be present and probably used first.

There are five forms of eliminationism:

1. Transformation: deleting/changing the cultural identities of people (examples include American Indian boarding schools).
2. Repression: systematically limiting the power of the target group through political disenfranchisement, ghettos, enslavement, segregation, or other legal means (examples include anti-Jewish legislation in pre-war Nazi Germany, Jim Crow laws, voter suppression and Apartheid).
3. Expulsion: removing the undesired group through deportation, forced removal, forced marches, concentration camps (examples include the internment of Japanese Americans).
4. Contraception: forced sterilization, anti-miscegenation laws, or systematic rape so that there will be no future for the group.
5. Extermination: mass murder or genocide.

== Effects ==
In his 2009 book Worse Than War: Genocide, Eliminationism, and the Ongoing Assault on Humanity, Goldhagen argued that eliminationism is integral to politics due to mass murder being "a political act", writing that "mass elimination is always preventable and always results from conscious political choice." Goldhagen describes various 20th-century atrocities, such as the Indonesian mass killings of 1965–66 and genocides in Darfur, Yugoslavia, Rwanda and Guatemala, arguing that each of these events were products of eliminationism, being perpetrated by "the decisions of a handful of powerful people" in contrast to popular perceptions of such events being carried out "in a frenzy of bloodlust."

During the 1991–2002 Algerian Civil War, the predominant faction of the conflict's first phase was known as les éradicateurs for their ideology and for their rural and urban tactics. These hardliners were opposed in the Army and the FLN by les dialoguistes.

Journalist David Neiwert argued in 2009 that eliminationist rhetoric is becoming increasingly mainstream within the American right-wing, fuelled in large part by the extremist discourse found on conservative blogs and talk radio shows, which may provoke a resurgence of lone wolf terrorism in the United States.

Professor of law Phyllis E. Bernard argues that interventions in Rwanda and Nigeria, which adapted American dispute prevention and resolution methods to African media and dispute resolution traditions, may provide a better fit and forum for the U.S. to address eliminationist media messages and their impact on society.

== See also ==
- Incitement to genocide
