= Abdelghani Hamel =

Algerian military personnel

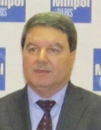
- Hamel in 2014

Director General of the Directorate General for National Security
- In office July 7, 2010 – June 26, 2018
- Preceded by: Ali Tounsi
- Succeeded by: Mustapha El-Habiri

Military service
- Branch/service: Gendarmerie Nationale; Directorate General for National Security
- Rank: Major general

Abdelghani Hamel (Arabic: عبدالغني هامل) is an Algerian politician and military figure who served as the Director-General of National Security of Algeria from 2010 to 2018.

== Biography ==
Hamel was born on July 3, 1955, in Sabra, Algeria. He holds a degree in computer science from the National School of Computer Science and a master's degree in strategic studies and international studies.

Hamel had a 37-year career in the Algerian People's National Army (ANP) in the Gendarmerie Nationale. He served as chief of staff of the 6th Regional Command of the National Gendarmerie of Tamanrasset and served in Ghardaïa. He later served as the head of the public security division at the National Gendarmerie in Algiers, and later regional commander of the National Gendarmerie in Oran. He then served as the head of the border guard force between 2004 and 2005.

In 2008, Hamel was promoted to the commander of Republican Guard by Abdelaziz Bouteflika. Hamel was also promoted to major general that year. He held the position of Republican Guard commander until 2010.

On July 28, 2010, he was appointed head of the General Directorate of National Security (DGSN), Algeria's police force, succeeding Colonel Ali Tounsi. He was dismissed as head of the DGSN in 2018, being succeeded by Colonel Mustapha El-Habiri.

== Illicit activities ==
On April 27, 2019, Hamel and his son were summoned by Algerian judicial authorities on the count of “illegal activities, influence peddling, misappropriation of land and misuse of office”. On July 4, 2019, Hamel and his son were summoned in a court in Sidi M'Hamed. The two were questioned by a prosecutor and imprisoned in El Harrach prison temporarily.

Hamel was sentenced to 15 years in prison on April 1, 2020 along with a heavy fine for several corruption cases that occurred during his tenure. This was reduced to 12 years with an appeal. His children Amiar, Chafik, Mourad, and Chahinaz were sentenced to ten, eight, seven, and three years in prison respectively. These sentences were all reduced to eight, six, five, and one year respectively. Hamel's wife, Annani Salima, was sentenced to two years in prison. His family's assets were confiscated.

In June 2020, Hamel was sentenced to 12 years in prison for "misappropriation of agricultural land and influence peddling", but this was declared null and void in April 2022. In another case, he was sentenced to four years in prison for "abuse of office and laundering public money for the financing of terrorist groups, under the guise of purchasing real estate" but he was acquitted in November 2021.

In October 2020, during a case involving Bouteflika's daughter Nachinachi Zoulikha, Hamel was sentenced to ten years in prison. Hamel's assets were confiscated in 2021.
