= Sûreté Nationale =

Sûreté Nationale may refer to:

- Algerian police
- National Police (France)
- Sûreté Nationale (Morocco)
- Sûreté du Québec

== See also ==
- Sûreté
