= Battle of Ain Defla =

Battle during the Algerian Civil War

- Part of the Algerian Civil War
Date	26 – 31 March 1995 (5 days)
Location	Ain Defla, Algeria
Result	Algerian government victory

Belligerents
Algeria	Armed Islamic Group

Commanders and leaders
Said Bey	Djamel Zitouni †

Strength
Unknown	1,000 to 1,300 militias

Casualties and losses
Unknown	600 to 800+ killed

The Battle of Ain Defla (Arabic: معركة عين الدفلى) was a major five-day-long battle from 26 to 31 March 1995 during the Algerian Civil War. It took place in the Ain Defla region when government forces ambushed 1,000 to 1,300 Islamist rebels. The Islamist rebels had a death toll of 600 to over 800, with as many as a thousand in total on both sides. Algerian newspapers described this as one of the worst rebel defeats in an area which they have controlled for months.

== Battle ==
The battle began after a government informer working within the Armed Islamic Group of Algeria warned the government authorities of a 1,000-strong conference of Islamist militias to be held in Ain Defla. Soon after, the army moved in on the rebels on 26 March, ambushing a group of Islamists in a convoy travelling to Algiers. The Algerian army commanded by General Said Bey ambushed the militias in Ain Defla with helicopter gunships and heavy artillery as they gathered for the meeting. Rumours swept Algiers of the razing of the whole town of Ain Defla. Helicopter gunships pursued fleeing guerrillas into the mountains. There were no estimates of casualties among the Algerian government, and government officials refused to comment on this. On 30 March, the leader of the GIA Djamel Zitouni was killed in the fighting. The battle ended in the victory of the Algerian government.
