= Zigha Djamila =

Algerian judge

- Citizenship: Algerian
- Occupation: Judge
- Years active: 1988-present
- Known for: Judge and first woman appointed as attorney general of the Court of Boumerdes
- Notable work: Attorney General

Zigha Djamila is an Algerian judge and first woman appointed as attorney general of the Court of Boumerdes. She was appointed into this position in 2014 by President Abdelaziz Bouteflika.

== Judicial career ==
Djamila began her career in 1988 working with Algerian prisons administration. From 1992 to 1996, she served at the court of Boufarik under the jurisdiction of the Court of Blida as president of summary proceedings, the social section and personal status. In 1996, she was moved to the court of Bab El-Oued where she served as the president of the penal section for five years.

In 2001, she was appointed advisor to the indictment chamber of the court of Algiers and was later promoted as head of the chamber in 2004 overseeing the investigating judges of the five courts under the territorial and local jurisdiction of the court of Algiers. Djamila is noted for ruling in important cases such as Sonatrach 1 and 2, the port of Algiers, east–west motorway, and in the case of the death of the former head of the National Security, Ali Tounsi.
