= Menad Nouba =

Algerian military personnel (born 1944)

Menad Nouba مناد نوبة

Commander of the National Gendarmerie of Algeria
- In office 10 September 2015 – 2018
- Preceded by: Ahmed Boustila
- Succeeded by: Ghali Belkcir

Personal details
- Born: 8 August 1944 (age 81) Algeria

Military service
- Allegiance: Algeria
- Branch/service: National Gendarmerie
- Years of service: unknown
- Rank: General-major
- Commands: Commander of the National Gendarmerie of Algeria

Menad Nouba (Arabic: مناد نوبة) is the commander of the National Gendarmerie of Algeria from the 10 of September 2015 to 2018.

In October 2018, Nouba was demoted from his position as head of the Gendarmerie nationale, forced into retirement, and detained in custody with several other generals, pending an investigation by the military justice on charges of corruption. He was replaced at the head of the Gendarmerie nationale by Général Ghali Belkcir.

The June 16th, 2021, Menad Nouba was sentenced to 15 years in prison. He was found guilty of « illicit enrichment and abuse of office » by the military court of appeal in Blida.
