= Killing of Antar Zouabri =

February 2002 event

- Part of Algerian Civil War
- Date: 8 February 2002
- Location: Boufarik, Algeria
- Type: Raid and shootout
- Participants: Special Intervention Group; Armed Islamic Group
- Outcome: Weakening of the GIA and end of the Algerian Civil War
- Deaths: 3

On 8 February 2002, Antar Zouabri, leader of the Armed Islamic Group of Algeria (GIA), was killed at age 31 in a shootout with Algerian security forces in his hometown of Boufarik, 25 km south of Algiers. As a result of this, the GIA was effectively immobilized and severely weakened. Newspapers reported his death several times before, but this is the first time it was announced by the government. This ended the Algerian Civil War which lasted since the Algerian legislative election on 26 December 1991.

== Shootout ==
Prior to the event, Zouabri had been planning a terrorist attack in Boufarik stadium when it was packed with supporters of two football teams playing a match that day, with two of his close collaborators, Boutheldja Fodhil and Hakim Boumediene. At the last minute, one of the two collaborators realized that they couldn't enter the stadium without being searched by security guards. They returned to the house, but their steps were tracked by security forces. At 3 p.m., security forces surrounded the house, closed all access to the street where the terrorist group stayed, and evacuated civilians to avoid injuries. At 5:15 p.m., the Special Intervention Group stormed the house. An urban police tank smashed down the main door while snipers took positions on the heights of neighboring houses. Zouabri's group threw two grenades to try and find a way out. One of the snipers fired a rocket into the room where the terrorists hid and set fire there. As they tried to run away, they were shot to death by the snipers on the two houses overlooking the neighborhood. Their identities were confirmed by fingerprints. Antar Zouabri has been the 8th leader of the GIA killed since 1992, and was succeeded by Rashid Abu Tourab as leader of the Armed Islamic Group.
