= Mustapha Kartali =

Algerian Islamist guerrilla leader

- Born: 1946 (age 79–80)
- Political party: Islamic Salvation Front

Mustapha Kartali (or Kertali; born 1946) was the main Islamist guerrilla leader in the Larbaa region during the Algerian Civil War.

In 1991, he was elected FIS mayor of Larbaa, a town south of Algiers. After the military banned FIS, he joined the Armed Islamic Group's guerrillas in fighting the government, becoming an emir. In late 1995, however, he left it - motivated, he claims, by its atrocities, and objecting to the new leadership of Djamel Zitouni.

On July 21, 1996, he announced the creation of a new organization - the Islamic Movement for Preaching and Jihad (MIPD) - uniting ex-GIA dissidents with the Movement for an Islamic State (MEI) and Islamic Front for Armed Jihad (FIDA); in the announcement, he condemned both the GIA and the AIS. His area of influence was around Larbaa, up to about Meftah and Tablat; at one point, his group is said to have numbered about 300. The government put a price on his head of 3 million dinars. In 1996, his son was arrested, and disappeared.

He eventually aligned himself with the FIS's armed wing, the Islamic Salvation Army, becoming the head of its Katibat Errahmane brigade. GIA efforts to take revenge on him for his desertion have been advanced as a possible motive for the Si-Zerrouk massacre (July 1997), the Djiboulo massacre (December 1997), and the Larbaa market bombing (July 2002) around Larbaa. El Watan mistakenly reported on February 23, 1997, that his corpse had been found; however, he was in fact alive.

He soon joined the AIS's unilateral ceasefire of October 1, 1997. He and 150 members of his group ceased combat on November 8, 1997 and took the amnesty offered by the government in September 1999 (other members had already done so in December 1998). He went on pilgrimage to Mecca around 2004.

The amnesty he received angered some locals, who see it as leaving crimes unpunished. Notably, Amina Kouidri, leader of a local association for victims of terrorism, holds him responsible for the unpunished murder of her twelve-year-old sister in 1994. He denies this, blaming the murder on the GIA.

Nissa Hammadi (Le Matin 30 Dec. 2001) claims that he is estimated to have a personal fortune of "several billion centimes" saved from his time as a guerrilla, taken from donations and unofficial taxes; it does not give its sources for this estimate.

On August 14, 2007, Kartali's car was attacked with a bomb in Larbaa and he was badly injured, losing one of his legs.
