= Garde communale =

Military unit in Algeria

Garde Communale
- الحرس البلدي
- Active: 3 August 1996–31 October 2012
- Country: Algeria
- Allegiance: Algerian People's National Armed Forces
- Type: Paramilitary
- Role: Counter-insurgency - Counter-terrorism
- Size: 95,000
- Engagements: Algerian Civil War

In Algeria, the Garde Communale (Arabic: الحرس البلدي), was a paramilitary troop in charge of monitoring and protecting the municipalities during the Algerian Civil War.

== Creation ==
The Garde Communale was created on 3 August 1996 as an auxiliary force by the Algerian government, under the impetus of the Algerian People's National Armed Forces authority. It played a significant role counter-terrorism warfare against armed Islamist groups.

== History ==
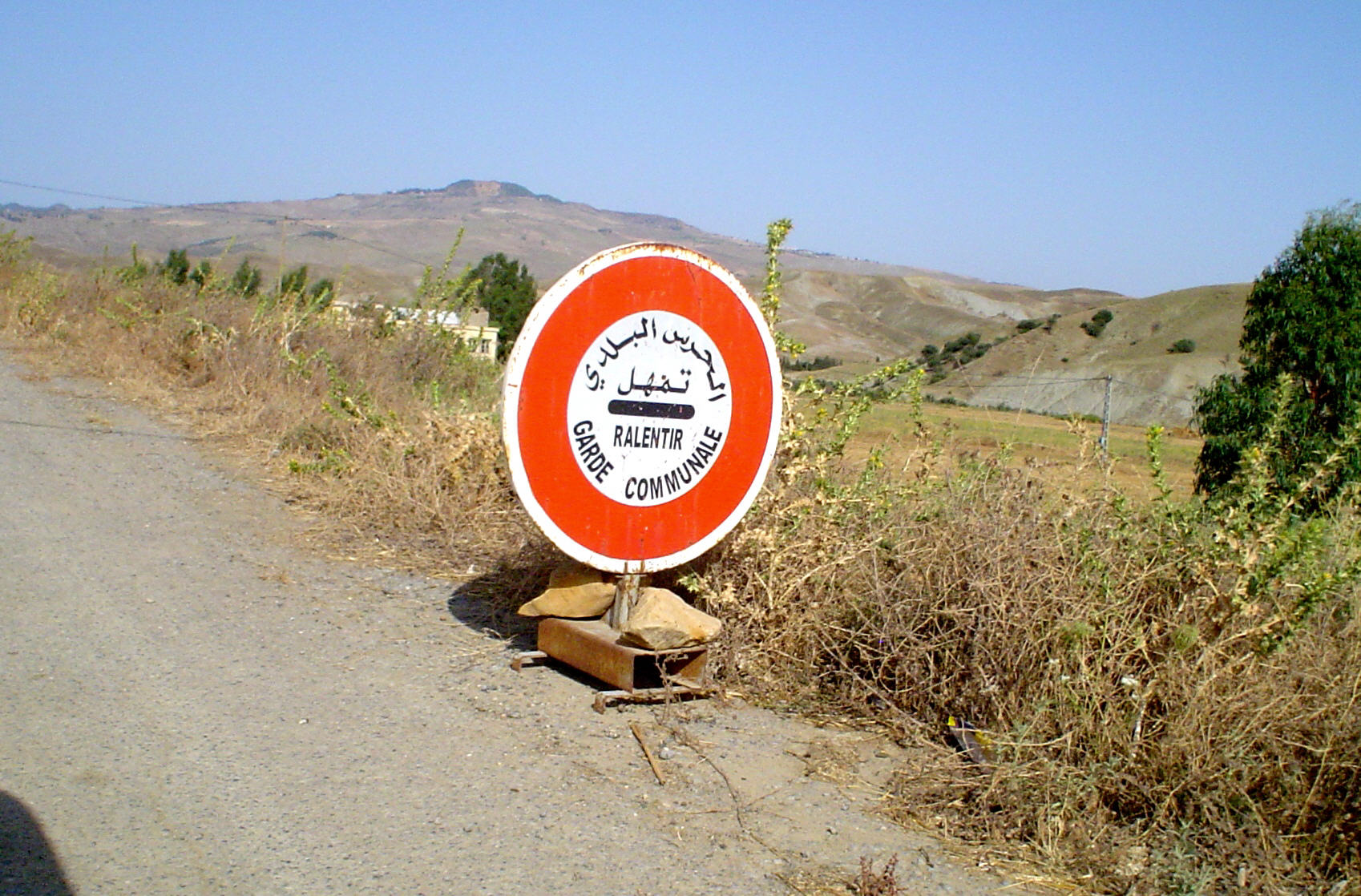
Roadblock of Garde Communale

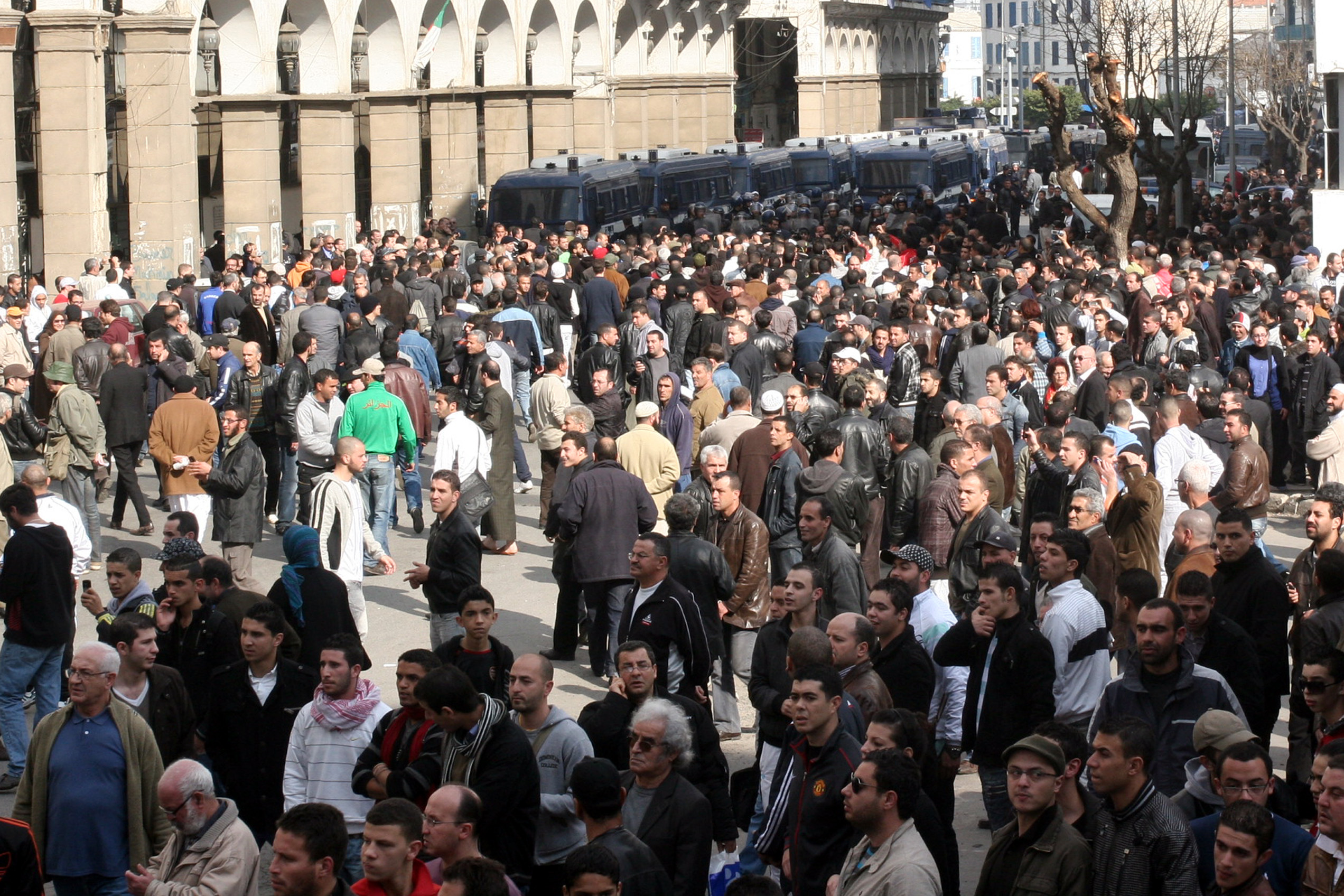
Demonstration of former members of Garde Communale

During the Algerian Civil War, the Algerian Army forces responsible for the security of the country in the big cities and the communes, were confronted with surging terrorist attacks which caused many losses in their ranks.

The military authorities, eager to relieve the army, which practically alone bore the weight of the anti-guerrilla warfare, decided, jointly with the Ministry of the Interior, to create a communal guard on 3 August 1996.

To do this, they recruit from the same pool as the guerrilla factions and local armed bands. Young people from the former Islamic Salvation Front join the municipal guard, by political calculation or by necessity. In the difficult economic situation of young people, a job in security is a godsend.

The recruits were supervised by the Gendarmerie Nationale and received an accelerated training of two months, wore the uniform and were paid, the government was able to offer them advantages such as housing and cars, but remained suspicious and did not entrust them with more sophisticated weaponry.

The Garde Communale was placed under the authority of the mayors of the DEC (Communal Executive Delegation) and the walis (prefects) and integrated into the new anti-guerrilla fight system, the communal guard succeeded in securing reconquered urban areas and allowing the army counter-terrorist corps to undertake its first attacks against the Armed Islamic Group maquis in 1994.

Members of the communal guard did not leave city centers in their early stages, and were only ever operational inside urban centers.

The Garde Communale was sometimes employed in search operations against armed Islamist groups in the mountains.

== Dissolution ==
The Garde Communale was dissolved by decree on 31 October 2012.

== See also ==
- Law enforcement in Algeria
- Algerian People's National Armed Forces
- Gendarmerie Nationale
- Special Intervention Detachment
- Algerian police
- Paramilitary
- Algerian Civil War
- List of armed groups in the Algerian Civil War
- Terrorist bombings in Algeria
- List of massacres during the Algerian Civil War
- Guerrilla warfare
- Counter-insurgency
- Counter-terrorism
