= Ahmed Boustila =

Ahmed Bousteila أحمد بوسطيلة

Commander of the National Gendarmerie of Algeria
- In office 5 July 2000 – 10 September 2015
- Preceded by: Taïyeb Derradji
- Succeeded by: Menad Nouba

Personal details
- Born: 8 August 1944 Aïn M'lila, Algeria
- Died: 14 October 2018 (aged 74) Paris, France

Military service
- Allegiance: Algeria
- Branch/service: National Gendarmerie
- Years of service: 1961–2015
- Rank: Général de corps d'armée"فريق"
- Commands: Commander of the National Gendarmerie of Algeria

Major-General Ahmed Bousteila (Arabic: أحمد بوسطيلة) was the former commander of the National Gendarmerie of Algeria. from July 5, 2000, until September 10, 2015.

== Early life and career ==
Bousteila Bousteila was born in Aïn M'lilain Oum el-Bouaghi on 8 April 1944, and it is suggested that he may take the helm at the ministry of defence. He joined the FLN Army as a Conscript in 1962 during the final stages of the War of Independence, and after Independence moved up the ranks to secure a commission from the Military Academy. Bousteila Bousteila was commissioned into the Army Signal Corps in 1965 and transferred to the Gendarmerie in 1969. He was trained in Intelligence work in the Soviet Union. In 1991, Bousteila Bousteila was promoted to brigadier general and commander of the 12th Gendarmerie Brigade. In 1996, he was promoted to major general and commander of the 2nd Security Division i.e. covering all Gendarmerie Divisions in North-Western Algeria. Bousteila Bousteila was promoted to Lieutenant general rank on 5 July 2014. He was involved in the Algerian government's rollout of biometric passports and also ordered increased security measures on roads.
