= Islamic Armed Movement =

Algerian Islamic guerrilla group (1982–87 and 92-94)

- Leaders: Mustafa Bouyali (1982-1987); Abdelkader Chebouti (1992-1994)
- Dates active: 1982–1987; 1992-1994
- Ideology: Islamism; Islamic fundamentalism

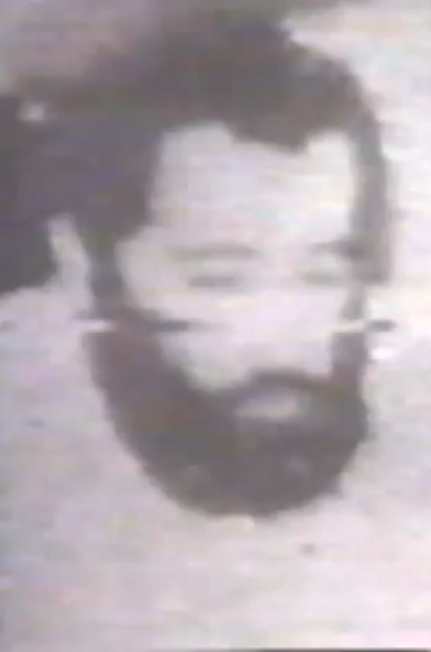
Mustafa Bouyali, the leader of the MIA from 1982-87

The Islamic Armed Movement (Note: Also called Algerian Islamic Armed Movement or Armed Islamic Movement (MIA, from French: Mouvement Islamique Armé; Arabic: الحركة الإسلامية المسلحة, romanized: Harakat El Islamiyyat El Musallaha)) was an Islamic guerrilla group and terrorist organization in northern Algeria in the 1980s and 90s. The group was the largest and most broadly-based Algerian Islamic extremist organization of the 80s. The group was founded by Mustafa Bouyali in 1981 or April 1982 or July 1982 after a confrontation with security services. The group, which carried out attacks against the government in the Larbaa region, was a loose association of small groups of which Bouyali proclaimed himself the emir. The group engaged in guerrilla warfare similar to the Maquis of WWII, and was based in the rural areas of the Atlas Mountains and the Blida District as it provided the ideal terrain for extremist groups, specifically targeting the Mitidja. Bouyali originally was a preacher at the El-Achour Mosque in Algiers where he had gained a following. In 1979 or '81 he formed the Group for Defense Against the Illicit, pressuring the government to implement Islamic law and to adopt policies that reflected "real" Muslim values. This group attacked bars and individuals, but had no real power, so Bouyali decided to turn to armed struggle. He was relentlessly harassed by security services though, due to his speaking out against the regime and his support for an Islamic state.

In July 1982, the MIA made its first bomb, however the group's activities were noticed by authorities when they experiment with it. On October 3, Bouyali escaped a kidnapping attempt by agents of the military's security. This caused him to go into hiding; in January 1983, he hid with Hadi Hamoudi near Bouguerra Mountain near El Aouinet. On November 12, 1982, Bouyali and four others fired for the first time at security forces at a police roadblock in Oued Romane, near El-Achour. Then they attacked a depot of a state company and stole 160 kilos of TNT. Bouyali and others then tested a new bomb on an Algiers beach and stole explosives near Cap Djinet. Due to these activities, a warrant was issued against Bouyali on December 10, 1982. In January 1983, Bouyali's brother was mistakenly killed in the crossfire of a shootout leaving his house. The death of his brother served as an important catalyst for his later increasing violent actions. In early 1983, possibly February or March, Bouyali met with Hadi Khadiri, the police chief and Minister of the Interior, although the meeting was a failure and did not stop Bouyali's campaign. Sometime in the early stages of the group, Bouyali sent the authorities a memorandum in thirteen parts and created a ninety-nine part guide with the aim of creating an Islamic republic in Algeria.

The group often attracted unemployed young men because "its rhetoric evoked 'memories of the bandits of honor in the mountains, paralleling the life of the Prophet and drawing on the original war of liberation'". One of Bouyali's supporters was Ali Benhadj, the man who would go onto be the vice-president of the FIS. In 1983, the Bouyali group attacked a production unit in Ain Naadja, Algiers and stole the workers' salaries. In 1983, the MIA also recruited many new members due to the release of a hundred Islamist prisoners in May 1983. On April 12, 1984, Sheikh Soltani died in his home during house arrest. The next day without any government mention of his death, a large Islamic gathering of 25,000 appeared at his funeral in Kouba. In the wake of this demonstration, the trial of a large group of Islamists scheduled for May 13 was called off and instead, a group of 92 political prisoners were released. Although many of his companions were acquitted, Bouyali was charged in absentia at that same trial and sentenced to death. On the night of August 21, 1985, Bouyali and his militants robbed a DNC (state-owned enterprise) factory in Aïn-Naadja of £110,000 or one million dinars and on August 26–27, (Note: The most likely time for this attack was the night of the 26th Other sources report it was on the 25th or the 29th) 1985, MIA insurgents headed by Bouyali, attacked a police school in Soumaâ, killing an officer and seizing 340 weapons, and more than 18,000 pieces of ammunition. In 1986, Bouyali organized clandestine cells, composed of veteran mujahideen members from Afghanistan. The group of several hundred militants lasted for five years, until Bouyali was killed on January or February 3, 1987, (most likely January 3) when police received information from Bouyali's driver. Bouyali and five others were driving in the mountains near Larbaa when the driver flashed on his lights and shots rang out from both sides of the road. Bouyali's final act was to shoot the driver in the head seconds before he was killed by a bullet to the forehead. All six including the driver were killed in the final clashes as well as a policeman who was the head of the elite security forces. Other sources also say that he was killed while in a confrontation with the gendarme in an Algiers suburb.

Other important MIA members such as Abdelkader Chebouti and Mansouri Meliani were sentenced to death and subsequently jailed, but released in 1989 and pardoned in 1990 due to political reforms. Meliani would later be arrested in July 1992 and executed in 1993 after he and Chebouti were captured after a battle in Ashour, a few hundred meters from Bouyali's unmarked grave. After the death of Bouyali, the MIA effectively fell apart and most members were arrested. On June 15, or 20, 1987, the largest trial of Algerian Islamists started, with 202 defendants and four in absentia represented by a 49 man defense council. On July 10, four were sentenced to death, seven to twelve years, 166 to between one and 15 years and 15 were acquitted.

== Rebirth ==
In March and April 1992, after the Algerian coup, Abdelkader Chebouti, along with Said Makhloufi, a former Algerian propaganda officer and Azzedin Baa, re-established the MIA with ex-Bouyalists and other affiliated group members. There is disagreement about the identity of the founders though; some sources say Makhloufi founded the Islamic State Movement (MEI) in 1993 while others say the MEI was founded by Meliani in early 92' while others still refer to Chebouti's group as the Islamic State Movement. Other sources even say that Chebouti died in 1992, under 'suspicious circumstances'. This group created the foundation for resistance leading to the Algerian Civil War as veterans of the MIA were the ones that launched the armed rebellion in 1992. The membership of the group varied, government forces said in April 1993 that there were 175 guerilla fighters (most of them MIA) with about 925 supporters although this number is thought to be a gross understatement with the true number as high as 10 or 15 thousand. A report on the Middle East in July 1993 reported the MIA to have around 1000 fighters who targeted security forces personnel and low level civil servants. In May 1992, five army battalions were mobilized against a MIA-affiliated group in a remote region near Lakhdaria. The group had planned to use its base to attack security forces and other targets in the region. Abdelkader Chebouti was also reported to have established a camp to shelter Islamist army deserters. The MIA later became the AIS in 1994 when it renamed to seem more brutal in comparison to the GIA. In January 1993, Ali Benhadj issued a fatwa from his prison cell granting the MIA the number two spot in the FIS, after the GIA. While 'General' Chebouti was the supreme leader of the AIS in name, Makhloufi effectively ran the group due to Chebouti's chronic illness. The relationship between the AIS and GIA fluctuated but most stayed peaceful as the two groups operated in parallel until March 1994 when the GIA 'liquidated' 70 MIA fighters who it suspected had ties to the regime. In August the AIS retaliated and killed a local GIA emir and members of his family in the Bilda plain.
