= Djamel Zitouni =

Algerian Islamic military leader

- Born: Djamel bin Mohamed Zitouni; January 5, 1964; Les Eucalyptus, Algiers Province
- Died: July 16, 1996 (aged 32)
- Cause of death: Murder
- Other name: Abu Abdul-Rahman Amine
- Occupation: Terrorist

Abu Abdul-Rahman Amine, born Djamel bin Mohamed Zitouni (January 5, 1964 in Les Eucalyptus, Algiers Province – July 16, 1996), was the leader of the Algerian Armed Islamic Group (1994–1996), a terrorist group responsible for carrying out a series of bombings in France in 1995. He was killed by a rival faction on July 16, 1996.

== Armed Islamic Group of Algeria ==
Cherif Gousmi was succeeded by Djamel Zitouni who became Armed Islamic Group head on October 27, 1994. Zitouni, 30-year-old son of a poultry merchant had very limited religious education but was adept at killing French citizens. Zitouni extended the GIA's attacks on civilians to French soil, beginning with the hijacking of Air France Flight 8969 at the end of December 1994 and continuing with several bombings and attempted bombings throughout 1995. In Algeria itself, he continued likewise, with car bombs, assassinations of musicians, sportsmen, and unveiled women as well as the usual victims. In February 1995 it issued a communique ordering that "for every pure Muslim woman arrested by the government, an apostate's wife would be executed." Non GIA Islamists such as Muslim Brotherhood members and Djazarist were condemned as Godless and ordered to repent "according to a precise procedure". Even at this stage, the seemingly counterproductive nature of many of its attacks led to speculation (encouraged by FIS members abroad) that the group had been infiltrated by Algerian secret services.

The region south of Algiers, in particular, came to be virtually dominated by the GIA; they called it the "liberated zone". Later it would be known as the "triangle of death". During this period, judging from its London-based magazine Al-Ansar, it worked out ever broader ideological justifications for killing civilians, with the help of fatwas from such figures as Abu Qatada. (Note: Abu Qatada's writings and speeches have been critically assessed by a contemporary Salafi Muslim scholar, Shaykh 'Abdul-Malik ar-Ramadani al-Jaza'iri, in the book Takhlis al-'Ibad min Wahshiyyat Ab'il-Qataad aladhi yu'du ila Qatli'n-Nisa wa Awlad (Jeddah: Maktabah Asalah al-Athariyyah, 2001 CE/1422 AH))

Reports of battles between the AIS and GIA increased (resulting in an estimated 60 deaths in March 1995 alone), and the GIA reiterated its death threats against FIS and AIS leaders, claiming to be the "sole prosecutor of jihad" and angered by their attempts to negotiate a settlement with the government. On 11 July, they assassinated a co-founder of FIS, Abdelbaki Sahraoui, in Paris (although some question the authenticity of their statement claiming credit for this.)

During the 1995 election, the GIA threatened to kill anyone who voted (using the slogan "one vote, one bullet"), but turnout was high among the pious middle class. Soon afterwards, the GIA was shaken by internal dissension: shortly after the election, its leadership killed Islamist leaders who had joined the GIA. In December, the GIA killed the number three figure in the MEI who had returned to the AIS, Azzedine Baa. In January Abderrezak Redjam announced he wanted to rejoin the AIS and was killed. The death of Mohammad Said followed in November 1995. The two men's deaths were not announced in Al-Ansar journal until mid-December 1995 when the GIA blamed the killings on the security forces, but a few issues later on January 4 and 11 announced that it had in fact killed the two for being "members of the heretic djazarist sect" and for plotting a coup d'état. Other Islamists suggested that they had objected to the GIA's indiscriminate violence.

Considerable uproar and accusations of manipulation of GIA by security service followed. Militants began "to desert in droves": Mustapha Kartali, Ali Benhadjar, and Hassan Hattab's factions all refused to recognize Zitouni's leadership starting around late 1995, although they would not formally break away until somewhat later. On May 31, 1996 Al-Ansar suspended publication demanding an explanation from the GIA, and a week later it and two other Islamists groups (including the al-Gama'a al-Islamiyya in Egypt) announced their withdrawal of support for Zitouni. In the summer of 1996 the GIA finally released a video of two friends of the victims "`confessing` to the plot and humbly requesting summary execution for themselves."

In addition the GIA pledged to fight the AIS as an enemy; particularly in the west, full-scale battles between them became common. In July 1996, Zitouni was killed probably by Islamist seeking vengeance for his killing of Mohammed Said and Abderrazaq Redjem, or by one of the breakaway factions – Ali Benhadjar's Medea brigade, later to become the AIS-aligned Islamic League for Da'wa and Jihad – and was succeeded by Antar Zouabri. Djamel Zitouni had earned notoriety for such acts as the killing of the seven Monks of Tibhirine in March, but his successor would prove to be far bloodier.

=== GIA in France ===
The Algerian state pursued a number of strategies against the GIA. One was to encourage France to take an active part in the fight against the networks of the GIA in France, and thus to cut off its principal means of support abroad. To prevent this from happening, brought a campaign of bombings, hijackings, etc. to France, in hopes the French government would conclude that "the price of terrorism within France was too high" and would withdraw its support from the Algerian regime and "hasten its collapse."

The GIA's first act was to hijack an Air France Flight 8969, which was due to fly from Algiers to Paris in December 1994. During their hijack the GIA announced "We are the Soldiers of Mercy". Intelligence provided by "Omar Nasiri" (a disgruntled GIA member turned mole) and a police raid of a safe house discovered their plan was to crash it on Paris, a plan prevented when the GIGN stormed the plane at Marseille.

The GIA conducted a series of bombings in France from 1995 to 1996. Analysis of a bomb with a failed trigger mechanism made it possible to identify a conspirator, Khaled Kelkal, who was shot and killed by French gendarmes on 29 September 1995. In late 1999, several GIA members were convicted by a French court for the 1995 bombing campaign.

After the death of Zitouni in 1998, prior to the World Cup, France in collaboration with other European countries launched a vast preventive operation against the GIA. About 100 alleged members of the group were arrested throughout Europe. In Belgium, security forces seized weapons, detonators and forged identity papers. On 11 June 1999, the GIA announced a jihad on French territory in a threatening letter addressed to the media.

== Bibliography ==
- William J. Crotty, Democratic development & political terrorism: the global perspective, UPNE, 2005. ISBN 1-55553-625-5
