= Les éradicateurs =

In the politics of Algeria, Les éradicateurs ("The Eradicators") are a faction within the Algerian political and military establishment during that country's civil war, which from 1992 pitted Islamist rebels against a military-installed government.

== Description ==
Les éradicateurs saw no room for compromise with Islamist politicians, and believed that militant organizations would be eliminated through force, refusing talks with their representatives as terrorists. Leaders included General Mohamed Lamari and Prime Minister Redha Malek; they received support from various groups, most notably the General Union of Algerian Workers (UGTA), but also smaller leftist and feminist groups such as the "ultra-secularist" Rally for Culture and Democracy (RCD).

They were popularly contrasted with les dialoguistes ("The Dialoguers"), who held that dialogue and national reconciliation was the only way forward. The latter faction eventually gained the upper hand, and the presidency of Abdelaziz Bouteflika (1999-2019) was marked by amnesties and attempt to draw Islamists back into constitutional politics.

The 1995 Sant'Egidio Platform, which united most of the Algerian opposition parties, was in large part directed against the éradicateur tendency.
