= Mustafa Bouyali =

Algerian guerilla leader

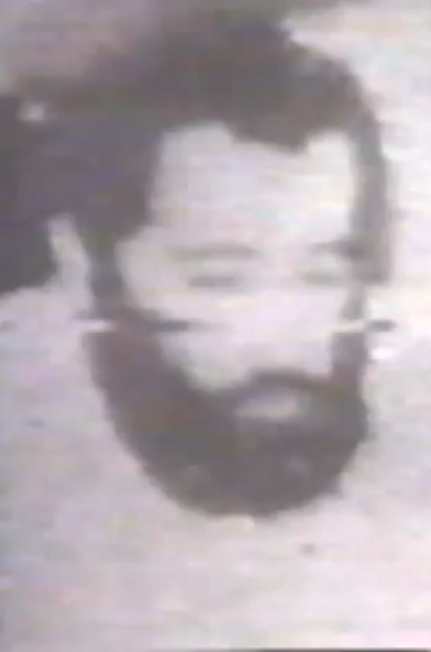
Mustafa Bouyali

Mustafa Bouyali (Arabic: مصطفى بويعلي) was the leader of the Algerian Islamic Armed Movement, a guerrilla group based around Larbaa south of Algiers, from 1982 to 1987.

== Life ==
Born in 1940, Bouyali fought for the National Liberation Front (FLN) in the Algerian War of Independence, becoming a captain. In the 1963–1965 period, he joined the maquis of the FFS, leading to his exclusion from the FLN. He later became an electrician for the national electricity company SONELEC, and had seven children. Near the end of the 1970s, he fell under the influence of imam Abdelhadi Doudi of the El-Achour Mosque, in the south of Algiers and began preaching at this Mosque in 1980. He was described as visionary imam who preached against Western-inspired iniquities of Algerians.

In 1979, he formed the "Group for Defense against the Illicit", intended to pressure the government to adopt policies seen as reflecting Islamic values, such as implementation of the sharia. As his efforts failed, he began considering the possibility of an armed effort, and started stockpiling weapons from mid-1981. In April 1982, a confrontation occurred between his group and the police in which his brother Mokhtar was shot; this incident convinced him that violence was called for.

In July 1982, Bouyali took to the maquis, with significant support in local towns, particularly Larbaa. The "Group for Defense against the Illicit" announced its transformation into the Algerian Islamic Armed Movement (MAIA). According to the government, it planned a variety of attacks, including the assassination of the Prime Minister, which were forestalled by the arrest of 23 of its members in mid-December. Further arrests were made in January 1983. However, Bouyali himself evaded the security forces, and fled abroad (probably either Iran or Libya).

In May 1984, the government released some 92 of his supporters. Within a few months, he returned, reestablished his contacts, reconstituted the MIA in February 1985, and began fighting again. In August, the group mounted two prominent operations - an armed robbery at a factory in Algiers on the 21st, and an attack on a police barracks in Soumaa on the 27th, killing a police cadet and taking weaponry. They painted the phrase "Allah the Avenger is with us!" across the gates of the barracks at Soumaa, to indicate that their motive was not simple criminality. Over the next two years, his group would continue its campaign, inflicting losses on government forces when pursued, but more generally targeting institutions it saw as un-Islamic, such as girls' schools, libraries, restaurants, and cinemas. On February 3, 1987, Bouyali finally fell in an ambush by gendarmes in the Algiers suburbs after he was revealed by one of his drivers, and the movement was destroyed. Its surviving members were put on trial in July, with 5 of the 202 tried receiving the death penalty and 15 acquitted. The last of these were released on July 29, 1990. In 1991, several of these, led by Abdelkader Chebouti, reconstituted the organization as the Armed Islamic Movement. Shortly afterwards, some, such as Mansour Meliani, split with it to found the notably more violent Armed Islamic Group.

He had two sons who now own shops in Algeria.

== Sources ==
- Willis, M. (1996). The Islamist Challenge in Algeria: A Political History. United Kingdom: Ithaca Press.
- Evans, M., Phillips, J. (2007). Algeria: Anger of the Dispossessed. Italy: Yale University Press.
