= Islamic Front for Armed Jihad =

Algerian militant Islamist organization

- Leader: Muhammad Said
- Dates active: 1993-July 21, 1996
- Split from: Armed Islamic Group of Algeria
- Merged into: Islamic Movement for Preaching and Jihad
- Ideology: Islamism; Algerian nationalism

The Islamic Front for Armed Jihad (French name, Front Islamique du Djihad Armé, hence the abbreviation FIDA) was a militant Islamist organization active during the Algerian Civil War. It was founded in 1993 (Note: Zoubir 2019 gives a year of 1992. Others including Botha 2008 and Jules 2023 give it as 1993) when it split from the Armed Islamic Group of Algeria (GIA), under the leadership of Muhammad Said. Coming from the Djaz'ara (Algerianist) wing, it called for the violent overthrow of the secular Algerian government, and a system of government based on shari'a law.

It became notorious for its killings of intellectuals, including politicians and journalists. These included the killing of Kasdi Merbah and of the head of the UGTA union.

On July 21, 1996, it merged under the auspices of Mustapha Kartali with the Movement for an Islamic State (MEI) and other splinter factions of the GIA to form the Islamic Movement for Preaching and Jihad (MIPD).
