= Cap Djinet =

Coordinates: 36°53′N 3°43′E

Cap Djinet is a cape at the Mediterranean Sea near the town of Djinet, 50 kilometers east of Algiers, near Dellys, in the Boumerdès Province of Algeria.

A moment magnitude scale (M_{w} 6.8) earthquake in northern Algeria on May 21, 2003 produced a shoreline uplift characterized by a continuous white band visible at rocky headlands. The uplift distribution indicated an average of .55 meters along the shoreline with a maximum of .75 m near Boumerdes and a minimum close to 0 near Cap Djinet.

On June 4, 2008, 6 soldiers were killed and 4 wounded at Cap Djinet during an attack attributed to islamic militants. The troops were returning to their barracks when their vehicle was hit by a roadside bomb.
