= Abdelbaki Sahraoui =

Algerian militant

Abdelbaki Sahraoui (Arabic: عبد الباقي صحرواي) (August 25 1910 - July 11 1995) was a co-founder of the Islamic Salvation Front (FIS) in Algeria.

== Biography ==
Sahraoui was born in 1910 in Constantine, Algeria. In 1926, he joined the circle of Sheikh Mubarak el-Mili. Five years later, he was conscripted by the French army, where he spent two years. He then moved to Algiers, where he was involved with the Muslim Scholars' Society. In 1990, he helped found the FIS; after the Algerian Civil War began, he fled to Paris, from which he preached in favor of armed struggle—jihad—against the Algerian government.

Sahraoui opposed the extension of the jihad to France. On 11 July 1995, he was assassinated by the Armed Islamic Group. His death was followed by a series of bombings in France.

== Sources ==
- Interview
