= Les dialoguistes =

Les dialoguistes ("The Dialoguers") is the French language popular term for a faction within the Algerian political and military establishment during that country's civil war, which from 1992 pitted Islamist rebels against a military-installed government. It was mostly used as contrast to les éradicateurs, the hardline tendency within the security and political elite which saw no room for compromise with Islamist politicians, and believed that militant organizations should be eliminated through force, who were refusing talks with their representatives.

Supported by most of the opposition parties, notably in the 1995 Sant'Egidio Platform, the dialoguiste faction eventually gained the upper hand, and the Bouteflika presidency (1999–2019) has been marked by amnesties and attempt to draw Islamists back into constitutional politics.
