= Triangle of Death (Algeria) =

Area of Algeria and site of several massacres

Coordinates: 36.41°N 2.63°E

The name Triangle of Death was given to an area southwest of the Algerian capital Algiers, whose apexes are Blidah, Médéah and Hadjout, where some of the worst massacres of the Algerian civil war took place. In 1998, 100 people were killed in a massacre that the Algerian government attributed to Islamic extremists. The attacks were carried out through the use of homemade bombs which were thrown into a cinema and a mosque in this region. Those who attempted to flee were killed by gunfire, knife attacks, and axes.
