= Algerian police =

Police Force of Algeria

Directorate General for National Security المديرية العامة للأمن الوطني
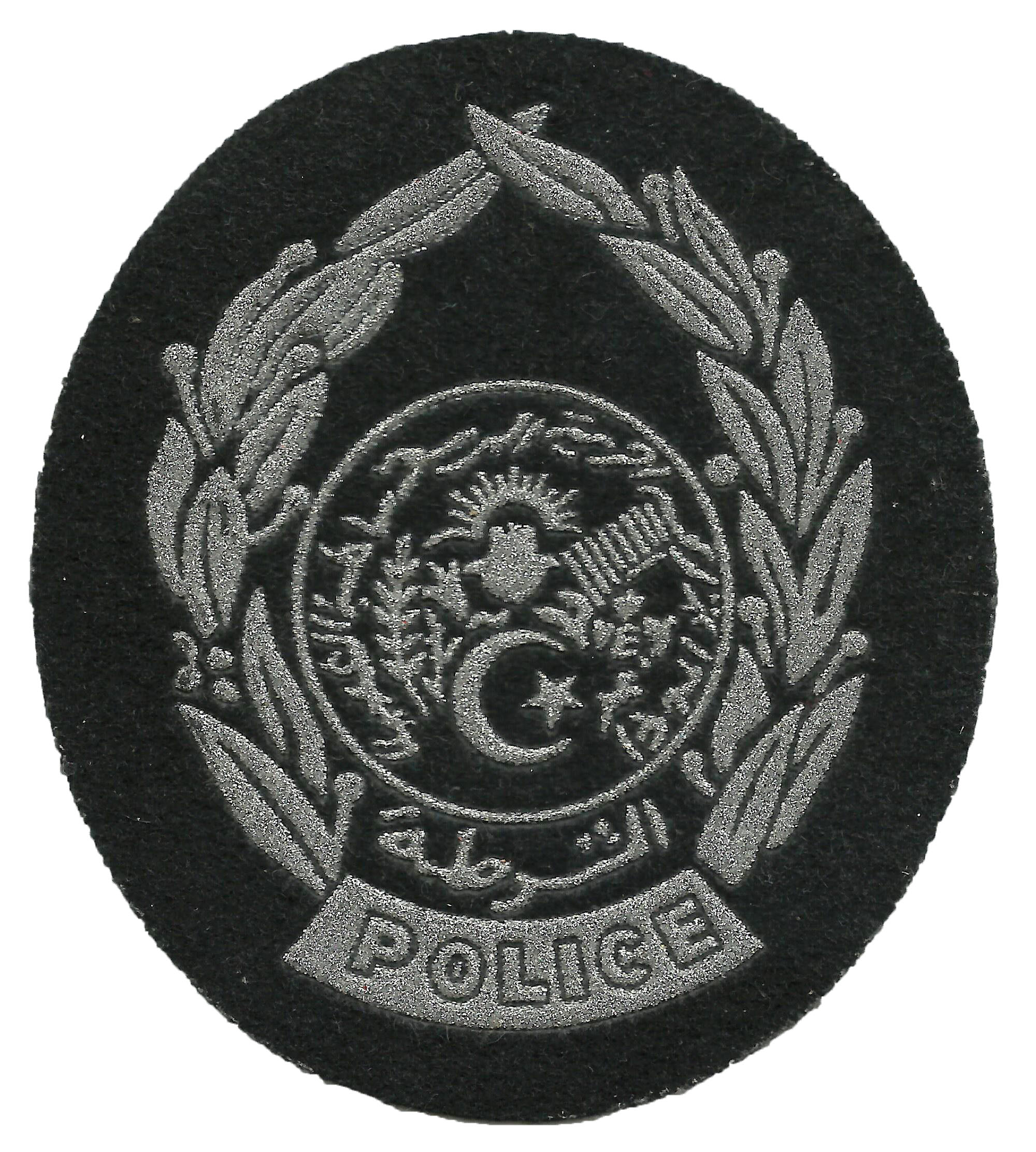
- Badge of the National Police.

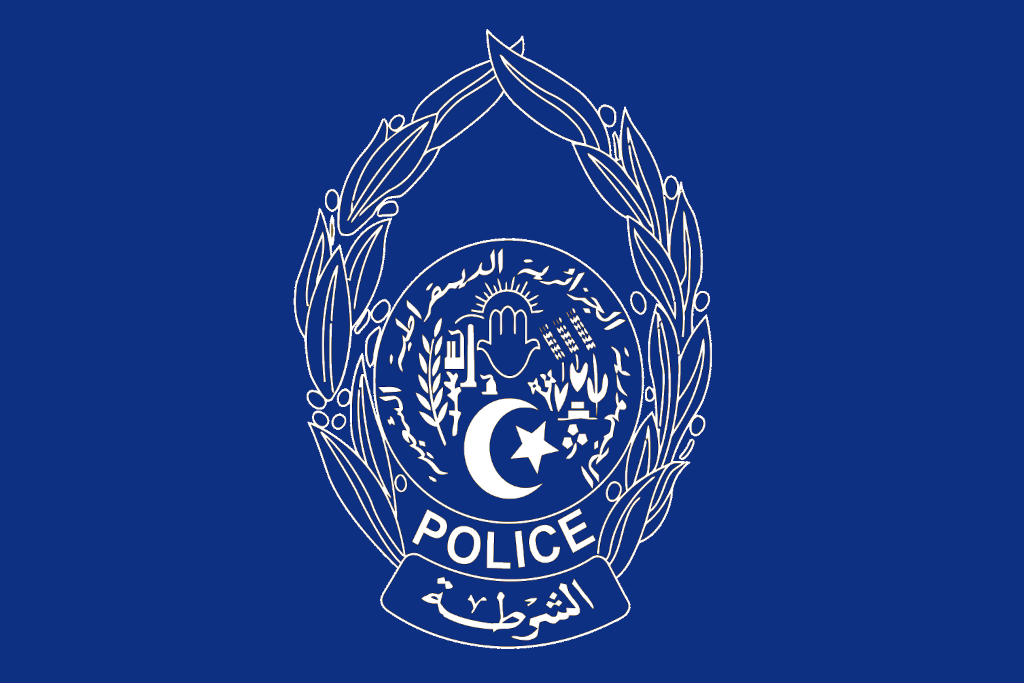

Agency overview
- Formed: 22 July 1962

Jurisdictional structure
- National agency: Algeria
- Operations jurisdiction: Algeria
- Governing body: Cabinet of Algeria
- General nature: Local civilian police

Operational structure
- Overseen by: Direction générale de la police nationale
- Headquarters: Algiers, Algeria
- Agency executive: Ali Badaoui, Director-General

Website
- Official website

The Directorate General for National Security (DGSN; Arabic: المديرية العامة للأمن الوطني, French: Direction Générale de la Sûreté Nationale) is the national civil police force of Algeria. It polices Algeria's larger cities and urban areas. The Sûreté is part of the Ministry of Interior and is charged with maintaining law and order, protecting life and property, investigating crimes, and apprehending offenders. It also performs other routine police functions, including traffic control.

== Organization ==
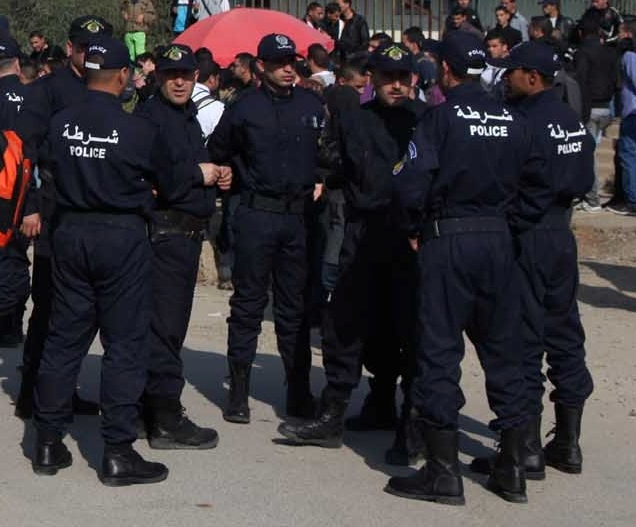
Officers from the Algerian Police

The DGSN is headed by a Director General and in 2007 consisted of a force of 130,000, including specialist operational and investigative branches and supporting services.

== Directors ==
Years	Command
1962–1962	Mohamed Medjad
1962–1963	Mohamed Yousfi
1963–1964	Larbi Tayebi
1964–1965	Mohamed El-Ouassini Yadi
1965–1977	Ahmed Draïa
1977–1987	El Hadi Khediri
1987–1990	Abdelmadjid Bouzbid
1990–1991	Bachir Lahrache
1991–1994	M’hamed Tolba
1994–1995	Mohamed Ouadah
1995–2010	Ali Tounsi
2010–2018	Abdelghani Hamel
2018–2019	Mustapha Lahbiri
2019	Abdelkader Kara Bouhadba
24 August 2019 – 16 March 2021	Khelifa Ounissi
16 March 2021 – 8 January 2024	Farid Ben Zineddine Bencheikh
Since 8 January 2024	Ali Badaoui

The judicial police branch is responsible for criminal investigations, working in close coordination with the Office of the Public Prosecutor in the Ministry of Justice. Police are assigned to the capitals of the wilayat are under the nominal control of the individual governors. A special riot police force is equipped with modern riot-control gear. Although the police were able to cope with urban disturbances and violence during the early and mid-1980s, the military had to be called in to help quell the severe riots in late 1988.

== Internal security ==
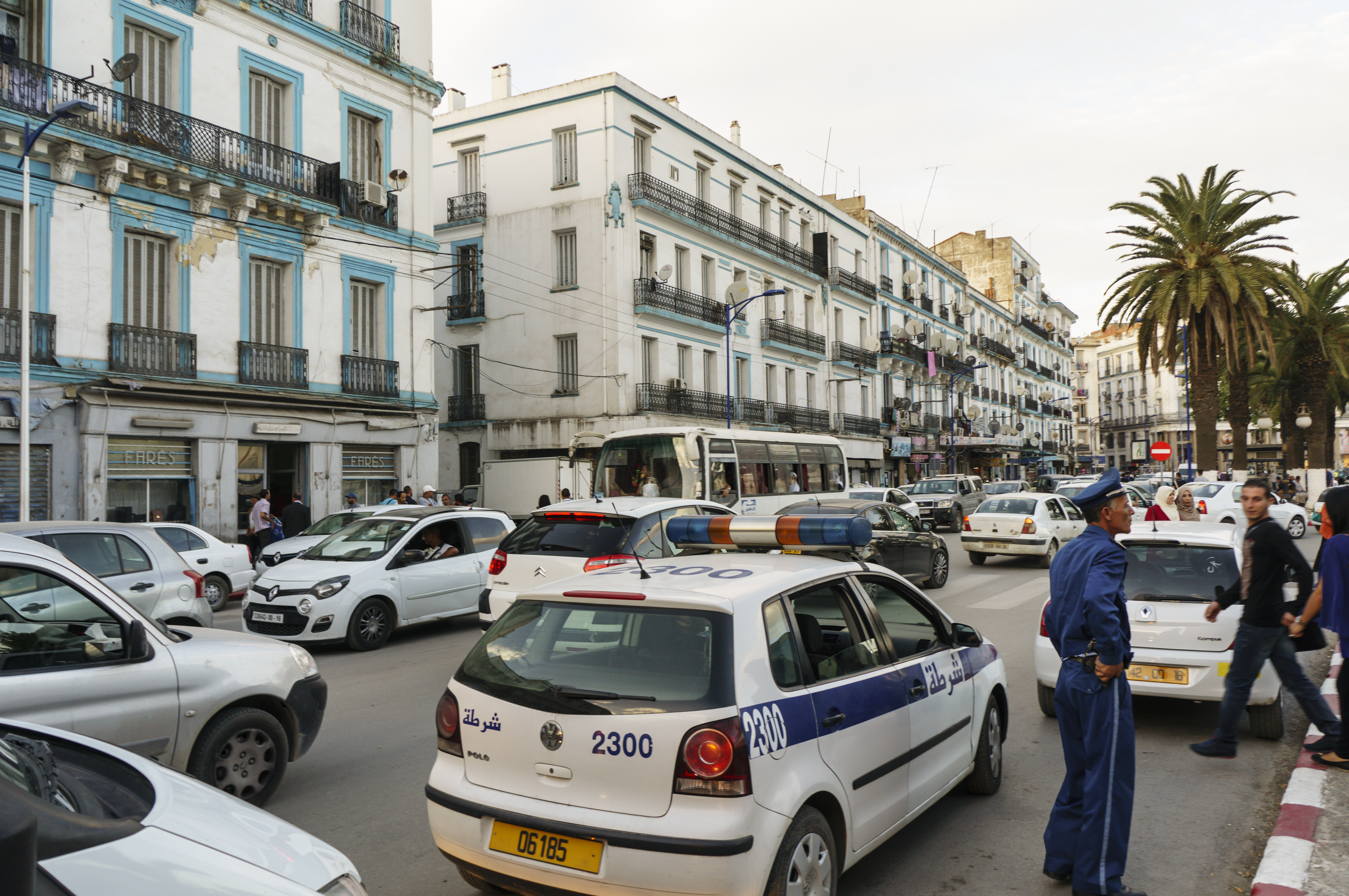
Public safety policeman in Annaba

Elements of the DGNS nationale also play a role in countering threats to the government arising from political subversion. The Sûreté assigns police contingents to work with customs inspectors at legal points of entry to control illegal activities. Their main concerns are apprehending undesirable immigrants and contraband traffickers. The Département du Renseignement et de la Sécurité (DRS) is the Algerian state intelligence service. It is separate from Directorate General for National Security and was an active player in the Algerian Civil War of the 1990s.

=== Weapons ===
- Glock 17
- Beretta 92
- Caracal pistol
- Smith & Wesson M&P
- AKM
- Beretta M12
- HK MP5
- SKS Commonly Seen And Used Since Algerian Civil War In The 1990s

=== Vehicles ===
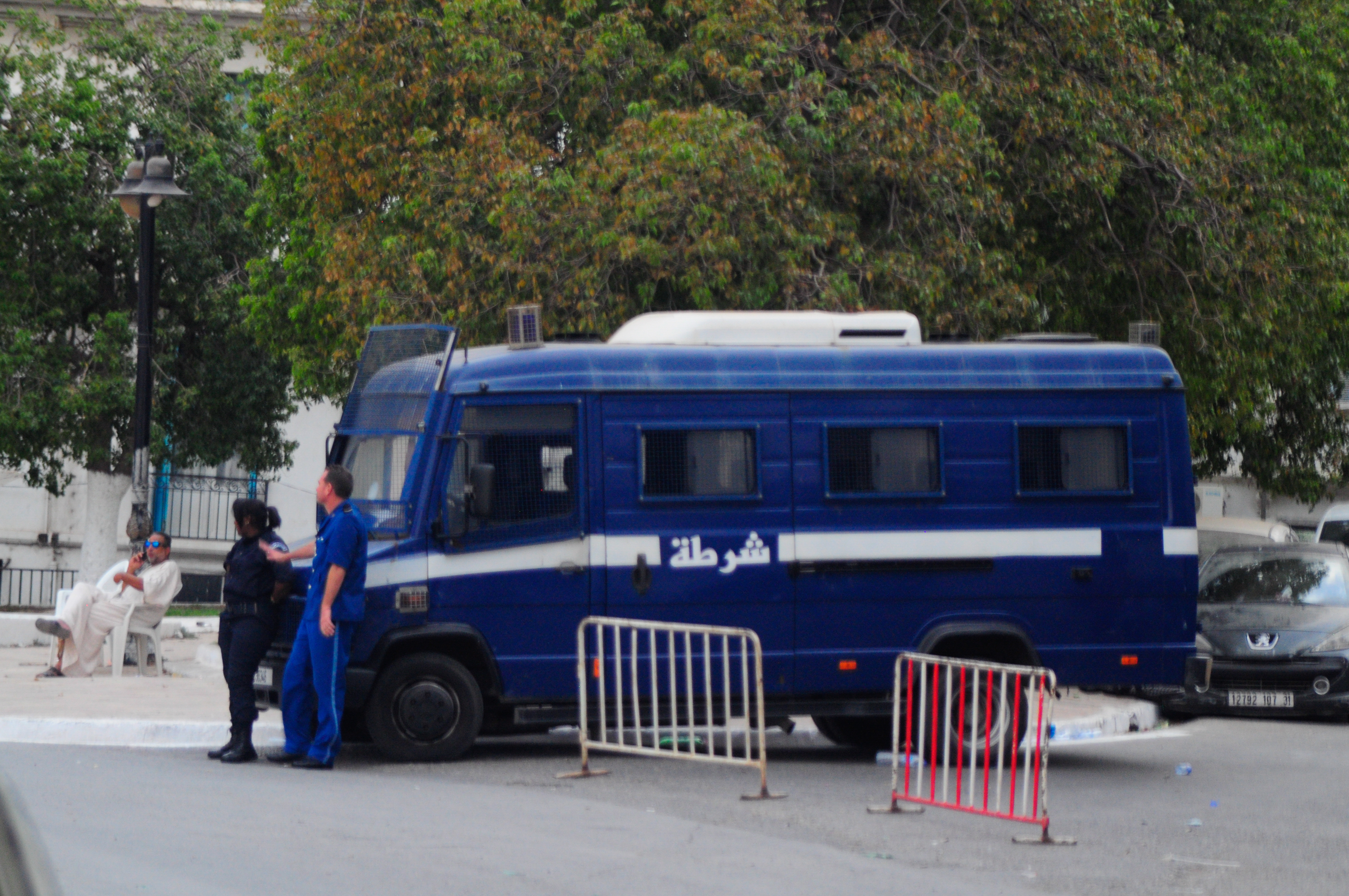
Algerian police van

==== Motorcycles ====
- BMW K1100RT
- BMW R1100RT
- BMW K1600GT

===== Cars =====
- Ford Focus
- Great Wall Hover
- Iveco Daily
- Kia Sorento
- Mercedes-Benz Vito
- Mercedes-Benz G-Class
- Mercedes-Benz Sprinter
- Nissan Patrol
- Peugeot Rifter
- Škoda Fabia
- Škoda Octavia
- Toyota Land Cruiser
- Volkswagen Caddy
- Volkswagen Golf V
- Volkswagen Polo mk4
- Volkswagen Transporter
- Volkswagen Passat b6/b7/b8

==== Special vehicles ====
- BCL-M5
- Nimr (armored personnel carrier)

== Aerial equipment ==
- AgustaWestland AW109
- Eurocopter AS350 Écureuil

== See also ==
- Sûreté
- Law enforcement in Algeria
- Garde communale
