= Ali Tounsi =

- Born: Ali Tounsi; September 24, 1937; Metz, France
- Died: 25 February 2010 (aged 72)
- Military career
- Allegiance: Algeria
- Branch: Sûreté Nationale
- Service years: 1954 - 2010
- Rank: colonel
- Unit: National Police
- Commands: Criminal Investigations Department Algiers; Annaba Police; Algiers Police

Ali Tounsi (Arabic: علي تونسي) (died February 25, 2010) was the Chief of Algeria's national police force between 1994 and 2010. He was shot dead in his office in Algiers by a senior police official, with whom he was arguing at the time. The official, said to be the chief of national police schools, was described as having acted during "an attack of madness". One source stated that other nearby officers returned fire; others indicated that it was Tounsi himself who wounded his attacker. The official statement released by the Interior Ministry said that the gunman had shot himself and was taken to a hospital. Two other people were said to have been injured in the attack. An inquiry into the killing has been opened.

At the time of his death Tounsi had been the chief of the National Police for over a decade. He was buried at the El Alia Cemetery.
