= Gendarmerie Nationale (Algeria) =

Police force

National Gendarmerie الدرك الوطني
- Emblem of the Gendarmerie Nationale

- Badge of the Gendarmerie Nationale

Agency overview
- Formed: 23 August 1962

Jurisdictional structure
- National agency: Algeria
- Operations jurisdiction: Algeria
- Constituting instrument: Decree No.019-62 of 23 August 1962 on the establishment of the National Gendarmerie.
- General nature: Gendarmerie

Operational structure
- Headquarters: Chéraga, Algiers
- Sworn members: 130,000
- Minister responsible: Abdelmadjid Tebboune, Minister of Defence
- Agency executive: Sid Ahmed Bourommana, Commanding General of the Gendarmerie nationale

The National Gendarmerie (Arabic: الدرك الوطني) is the gendarmerie force of the People's Democratic Republic of Algeria. A branch of the People's National Army, commanded by a major general who reports directly to the minister of national defense. It was created in 1962 by Decree No.019-62 of 23 August 1962 shortly after its independence. In 2012 the gendarmerie consists of 130,000 personnel. Although generally regarded as a versatile and competent paramilitary force, the gendarmerie has been severely tested in dealing with civil disorder since 1988. It frequently has lacked sufficient manpower at the scene of disorder and its units have been inadequately trained and equipped for riot control. The gendarmerie, however, has demonstrated the ability to root out terrorist groups operating from mountain hideouts.

The current commander is General Nouredine Gouasmia, who succeeded General Abderrahmane Arar in 2020.

== Duties ==
The gendarmerie is responsible for maintaining law and order in villages, towns, and rural areas; providing security surveillance over local inhabitants; and representing government authority in remote regions, especially where tensions and conflicts have occurred in the past.

== Organization ==
The gendarmerie is organized in battalions, whose component companies and platoons are dispersed to individual communities and desert outposts. Its regional headquarters are in the same cities as the six military regional headquarters with subdivisions in the forty-eight wilayat. It consists of a General Headquarters in Algiers and 6 subordinate Regional Commands (Divisions), plus 4 commands for Recruitment & Training, Intelligence, Administration and Detection. The 6 Regional Commands each command 3 to 4 "Brigades".

Several specialized units also exist within the gendarmerie, and were established to confront the increase in crimes and criminals:

- Administrative Unit
- Aerial Training Formation
- Border Guards Unit, created on November 17, 1977
- Cultural Heritage Protection Unit
- Environmental Protection Unit
- Juvenile Protection Brigade, created in 2011
- Security and Intervention Detachment
- Special Intervention Detachment, created on August 27, 1989

== Equipment ==
A highly mobile force, the gendarmerie possesses a modern communications system connecting its various units with one another and with the army. Equipment includes light armored weapons and transport and patrol vehicles.

The force in 1993 had 44 Panhard M3 armored personnel carriers (an APC variant of the Panhard AML.). 50 Fahd armored personnel carriers, and 28 Mi-2 light helicopters and 10 AgustaWestland AW109, In addition to AS355 Ecureuil 2 helicopters.

== Training ==
In addition to utilizing training provided by the French since independence, the gendarmerie operates its own schools for introductory and advanced studies. The gendarmerie's main training center is at Sidi Bel Abbes, The officers school is at Isser, about 80 kilometers east of Algiers.

== Commandment ==
The commandment of gendarmerie was successively entrusted to:

Années	Commandement
1962–1977	Colonel Ahmed Bencherif
1977–1986	General Mostepha Cheloufi
1986–1987	General Zine El Abidine Hachichi
1987–1997	Army corps general Abbas Gheziel
1997–2000	Major General Tayeb Derradji
2000–2015	Army corps general Ahmed Boustila
2015–2018	Major General Menad Nouba
2018–2019	General Ghali Belakcir
2019–2020	Major General Abderrahmane Arar
2020–2021	General Nouredine Gouasmia
2021–2025	Major General Yahia Ali Oulhadj
Since 2025	General Sid Ahmed Bourommana

== See also ==
- Special Intervention Detachment
- Garde communale
