= Special forces of Algeria =

Algerian special military and police units

Special Forces of Algeria
- Forces Spéciales Algériennes (French) القوات الخاصة الجزائرية (Arabic)
- Algerian special forces badge
- Active: 1963 - present
- Country: Algeria
- Agency: Algerian Land Forces
- Type: Special forces

The Algerian People's National Armed Forces (ANP) has several special forces regiments as well as several specialized regiments.

In addition, the Algerian security forces also have special units and specialized units.

== History ==
=== 1963-1990 The setting up and creation of special units ===
It is from 1963 that the Algerian army started to set up commandos within its ranks, the latter were based in Skikda.

Within their garrison there was also the army commando school.

Then, following the relocation of the commando school to Biskra in 1971 and the development of military parachuting within the Algerian army in the 1980s, the Algerian Land Forces decided to set up Parachute Commando Regiments, which were originally intended to provide security for oil and gas installations in the south.

The first Parachute Regiments appeared in the 1980s, the first being the 4th RAP in Laghouat, the 12th RAP in Biskra and the 18th RAP in Hassi-Messaoud, which later became "Regiments de Parachutists Commandos" (RPC). At the same time, in the naval forces, the first parachute regiments were created.

At the same time, in the naval forces, more precisely in 1985, the Marine Fusilier Battalions were created and these units also included combat divers whose mission was to carry out offensive actions from the sea and intelligence.

It was also at the end of the 1980s that the Special Intervention Group (GIS) of the Military Security (SM) and then the Department of Intelligence and Security (DRS), which were the intelligence services of the time, as well as the Special Intervention Detachment (DSI) of the Algerian National Gendarmerie were created. These were created respectively in 1987 for the GIS and in 1989 for the DSI.

The GIS was particularly noted for its success in numerous confrontations with terrorists during the 1990s. It distinguished itself in particular during the operations in Ain Allah in 1994, in Ouled Allel in 1997, or in the hunt for the group that kidnapped German and Austrian tourists in southern Algeria in 2003. Later, the GIS played a key role in the fight against terrorism. Later, the GIS would play a decisive role in solving the Tiguentourine hostage crisis in January 2013, and it would also participate in tracking down and destroying the Jound el Khalifa group following the kidnapping and decapitation of Hervé Gourdel in September 2014. The DSI, for its part, was involved in the investigation of the kidnapping of a number of Algerian citizens.

As for the DSI, it also distinguished itself during the 1990s for having participated in complex anti-terrorist operations with other special units of the ground forces. Its main feat of arms was during the resolution of the Tiguentourine hostage crisis in January 2013 with the GIS.

In 1988, the 25th Reconnaissance Regiment (25th RR) was created in Beni-Messous, a suburb of Algiers. This regiment has participated enormously in the fight against terrorism during the 1990s, but due to its discretion this regiment remains unfortunately very mysterious, and very little information is available about it. Its missions are operational reconnaissance and intelligence for the land forces headquarters, similar to the French 13th Parachute Dragon Regiment (13e RDP). The members of the 25th RR all received para-commando training as well as specialized training in search and acquisition of intelligence.

Following the creation of these units, Algeria finally possessed true special forces units with the GIS and the DSI. Moreover, these units were created at a sensitive moment in Algeria's history, as they were created shortly before the black decade.

The end of the 1980s were therefore the years of creation of special forces units and shock units of the Algerian army.

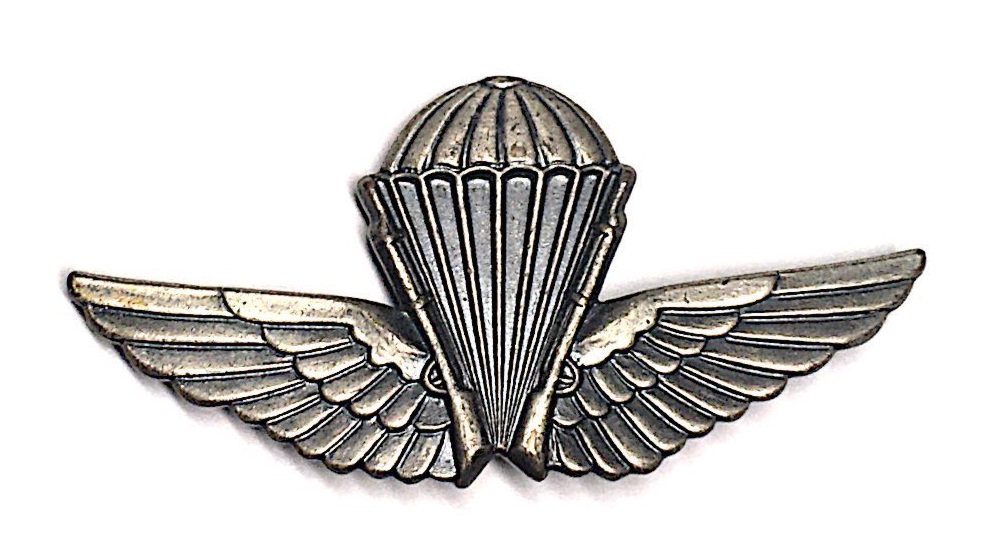
Insigna of the diploma of Paratroopers of the Algerian Army.

=== The role of the special units during the Algerian civil war ===
In 1992, the centre of conduct and coordination of actions of anti-subversive fight (CLAS) was created.

It will become operational from September 1992, and will be installed at the level of the headquarters of the command of the ground forces, in Aïn-Naadja in the suburb of Algiers.

This structure was composed of special army units and personnel from the Department of Intelligence and Security (DRS).

At its creation, CLAS included three parachute regiments (the 4th and 18th RAP, and the 12th RPC), a military police battalion (the 90th BPM) and a reconnaissance regiment (the 25th RR).

In addition, the Gendarmerie's Rapid Intervention Group (GIR) and men from the Army's Central Security Directorate (DCSA) were also mobilized to supervise and support the sweep operations.

It should also be noted that in the same year, the regiments and battalions of air fusilier commandos (RFCA) made their appearance in the Algerian air force with the graduation of their first class.

The air commando fusiliers, like the paratroopers and marine fusiliers, also played an important role in the fight against terrorism in the maquis during the 1990s. For example, members of the 782nd RFCA neutralized terrorists during a skirmish in the centre of Laghouat without causing collateral casualties or injuries.

However, the territorial organization of CLAS was restructured in March 1993, notably with the creation of "operational sectors" covering several wilayas, each of which worked jointly with the police, the gendarmerie, and army detachments and, a few years later, militias.

The military of the special troops depended on the CLAS and worked closely with those of the DRS. Some units were jointly dependent on these two commands. In each military region, the elements of the territorial research and investigation centres (CTRI) depended on the DRS, and these worked closely with those of the CLAS.

The parachute commando regiments were therefore moved from their cantonment to the Algiers region, and their prerogatives have changed, their mission is now to carry out special operations, acquire intelligence, and fight terrorism.

=== 2000-2020 the reorganization and creation of new units within the army and security forces ===
Following the events of the black decade, the para-commandos regiments returned to their original billets in the early 2000s.

The years 2000 and 2010 were also marked by the creation of new special amphibious units, such as the marine commandos in 2005.

The year 2005 also saw the creation of the 104th Operational Maneuvers Regiment (104th RMO), which was created to support the GIS and to provide the ground forces of a NATO-type special forces regiment, rather than shock units like the paratroopers. In fact, apart from the GIS, the 104th RMO was not a special forces regiment.

Indeed, apart from the DRS's GIS and the gendarmerie's DSI, the Army had no special forces units before the 104th RMO was created in 2005.

That same year, the police created the first search and intervention brigade (BRI) in Algiers, to replace the police intervention unit (UISP), which was the Algerian police intervention group and had been disbanded a year earlier. The BRI is the first special forces unit in Algeria. The BRI is the intervention unit of the judicial police.

The Republican Guard also decided to acquire a special forces regiment, with the creation of the Special Intervention Regiment (RSI) in 2015, modelled on the DSI for the Republican Guard. The RSI is a special forces regiment that has been in existence since the beginning of the 1990s.

Nevertheless, 2015 was also the year of the reorganization of the security services, as well as the armed forces, as the GIS was disbanded and the 116th Operational Maneuvers Regiment (116th RMO) was created to replace the GIS for the Algerian army's special operations.

The 116th RMO was originally named the 9th Commando Group before keeping their current name of the 116th Operational Manoeuvre Regiment in 2016.

We can therefore speak of a reorganization of the GIS, which lost its status as an intervention group and adopted a regimental status. In addition, a very large part of the operators, vehicles, equipment, and infrastructure of the GIS were taken over by the 116th RMO.

The organization of the 116th RMO and the GIS remained more or less identical, as did their operational means and their range of missions.

The difference is at the level of command, which no longer belongs to the DRS (which will be dissolved the following year in 2016) but to the ground forces.

Moreover, they are under the direct orders of the army's chief of staff, and their missions are monitored by the army's high command, and are even monitored at the highest political level.

Following this major reorganization within the army, it was the turn of the Algerian police to create its own special unit in July 2016, the police special operations group (GOSP). This unit is similar to the French RAID, it is the Algerian police intervention group.

== Special forces ==
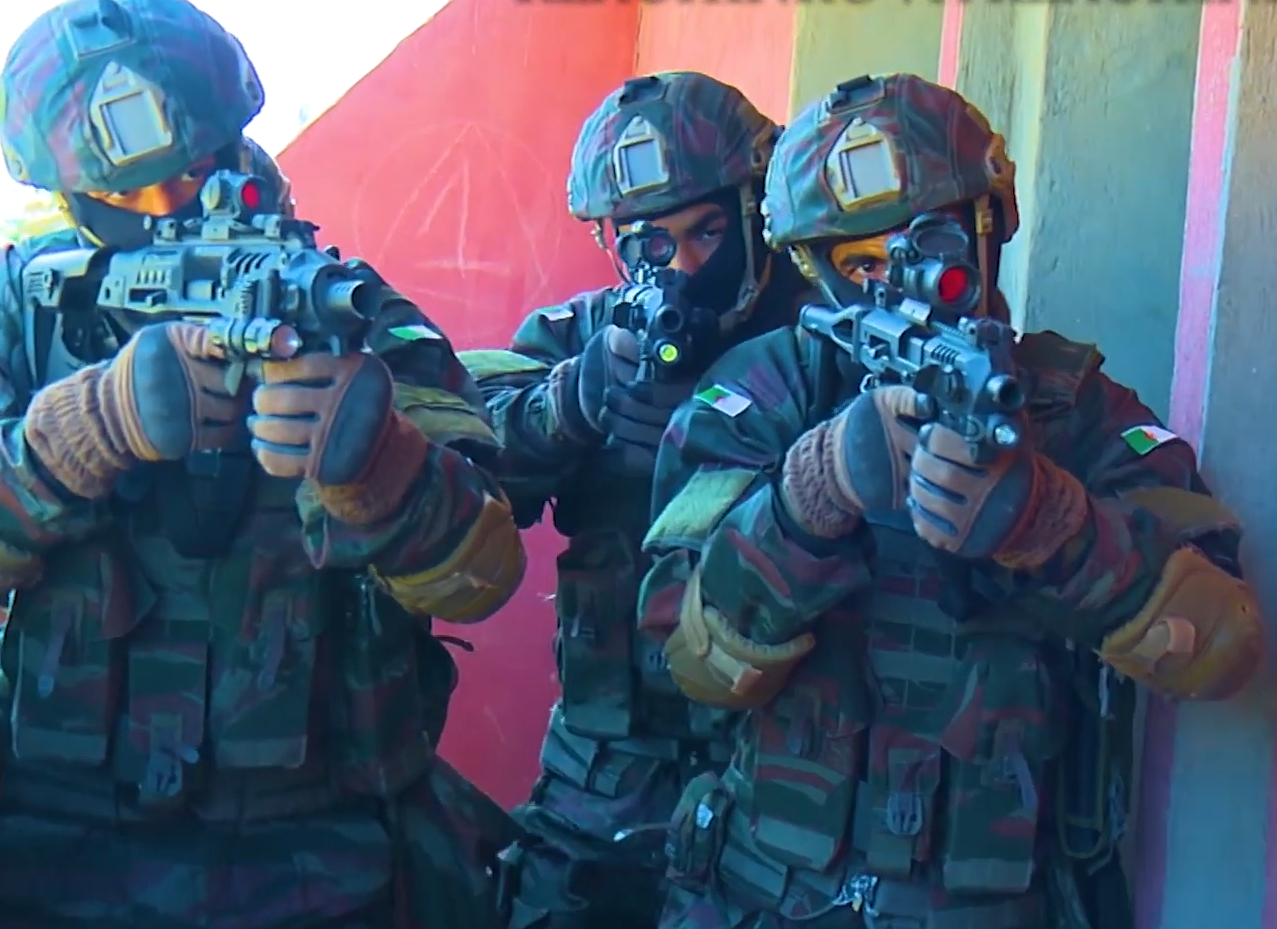
Operators of the 104th RMO during training.

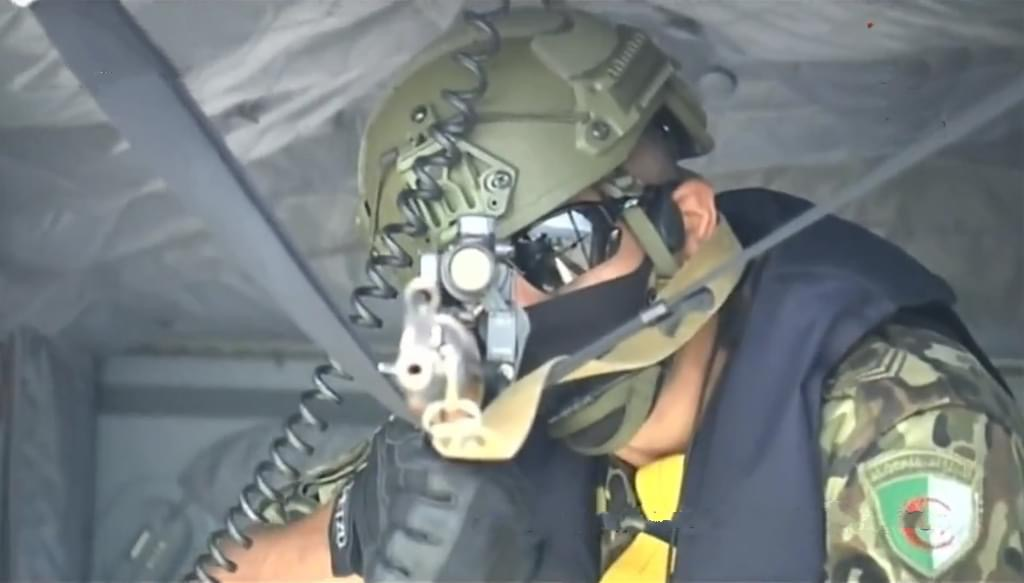
Sniper of the RASM during training.

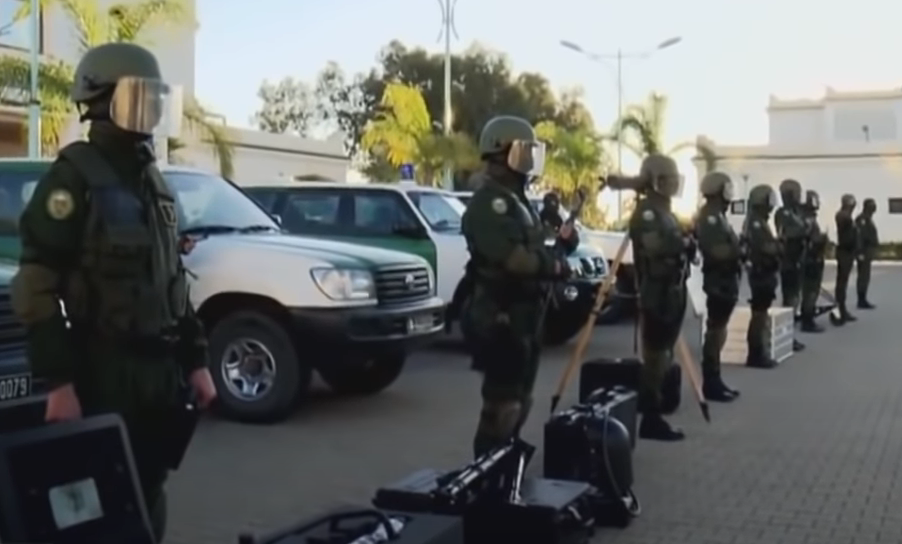
Intervention unit of the DSI.

The different armed forces have special forces regiments, each of which has a weapon specialization.

For example, the RASM, which is the navy's special forces regiment, specializes in special amphibious operations, maritime counter-terrorism, etc. The 116th RMO, which belongs to the army, specializes in anti-terrorist and hostage rescue units, etc.

Each regiment has its own specificity and its own codes, and the same is true for recruitment, which has its own recruitment criteria and is different from one regiment to another.

The security forces also have their own special forces units, such as the GOSP for the police, or the DSI for the gendarmerie.

=== Land forces ===
- 104th Operational Maneuvers Regiment (104th RMO)
- 116th Operational Maneuvers Regiment (116th RMO)
- 25th Reconnaissance Regiment (Algeria) (25th RR)

=== Navy ===
- Navy Special Action Regiment (RASM)

=== Air Force ===
- 772nd Air Commandos Rifle Regiment

=== Republican Guard ===
- Special Intervention Regiment (RSI)

=== National Gendarmerie ===
- Special Intervention Detachment (DSI)

=== Police ===
- Police Special Operations Group (GOSP)

== Specialized units ==
The Algerian army has different shock regiments within each army corps.

The ground forces have the parachute commandos, the military police, or the reconnaissance regiments. The naval forces have the marine fusiliers and the air forces have the air fusiliers.

These units are called "shock" units because they receive a thorough training called commando because their missions are first degree interventions, intelligence, close protection, escort and the realization of sensitive operations.

However, they are not special forces like the 104th RMO or the RASM.

The security forces also have shock units like the BRI for the police or the SSI for the gendarmerie.

They are the shock units of the Algerian security forces.

=== Army ===
- Parachute Commando Regiments (RPC)
- Military Police Battalions (BPM)
- Reconnaissance regiments (RR)

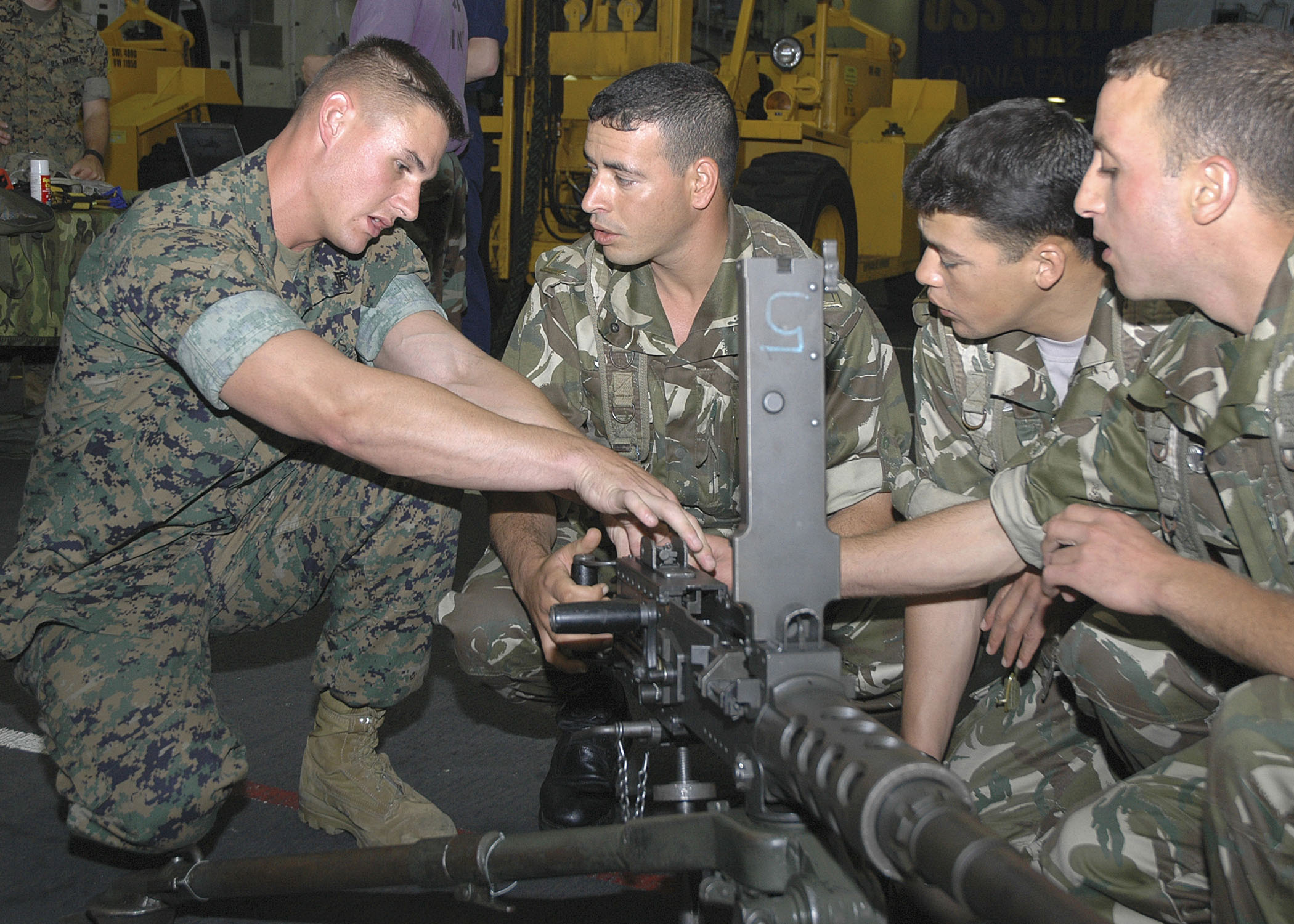
Members of the RFM with a USMC member during an exchange.

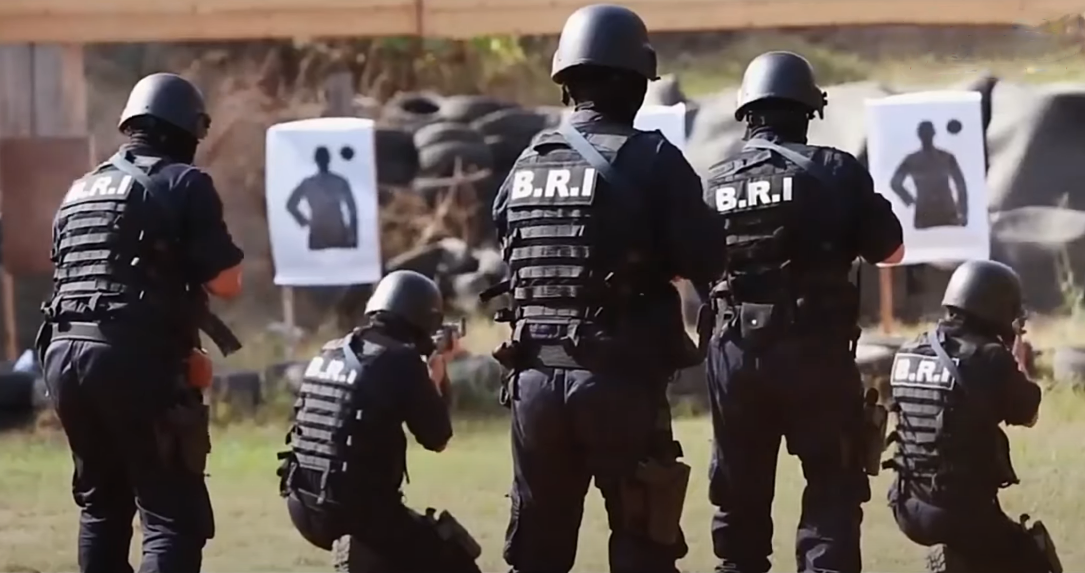
Members of the Algier's BRI during a training.

=== Navy ===
- Marine Fusilier Regiments (RFM)

=== Air Force ===
- Air Commandos Rifle Regiments (RFCA)

=== Republican Guard ===
- Directorate of Security and Presidential Protection (DGSPP)

=== National Gendarmerie ===
- Safety and Intervention Sections (SSI)
- Intervention and Neutralisation Groups (GIN)

=== Police ===
- Research and intervention brigades (BRI)
- The Intervention and Protection Brigade (BIP)
- The Personality Protection and Security Service (SPS)

== Training ==
Most members of the Algerian army's special forces are trained in the specialized military schools of the Algerian army:

- Special Troops Superior School (ESTS), for officers and non-commissioned officers, in Biskra.
- Special Troops Training Center (CFTS), for non-commissioned men, in Biskra.
- Commando Training and Parachuting Initiation School (EFCIP) in Boghar.

Basic training is done in Biskra at ESTS or CFTS, and advanced training is done in Boghar at EFCIP.

== Dissolved units ==
Since independence, several units have been created and dissolved, for operational, organizational or other reasons.

- The Special Intervention Group (SIG)
- The Special Intervention Police Unit (UISP)
- The National Office for the Suppression of Banditry (ONRB)
- The Centre for the Conduct and Coordination of Anti-Subversive Action (CLAS)
