= List of equipment of the Algerian Land Forces =

This is a list of the equipment currently used by the Algerian Land Forces. It also contains equipment used by the Territorial Air Defence Forces, which is a separate service branch of the Algerian People's National Army tasked with the protection of the country's airspace. Most of the equipment of the land forces of Algeria is provided by Russia and China.

== Vehicles ==
Model	Image	Origin	Type	Number	Notes
=== Tanks ===
T-90SA		Soviet Union; Russia Russia	Main battle tank	600	The Algerian Army was the second largest operator of the T-90
T-72M1		Soviet Union	Main battle tank	325	Variants include T-72M1 and T-72M1M.
T-62		Soviet Union	Main battle tank	290	Starting in 2021 the Algerian T-62 fleet underwent a unique homemade upgrade, turning the vehicle from an MBT into a fire-support vehicle by replacing the old turret with a "Berezhok" turret containing a PKT, a 30 mm autocannon, four Kornet ATGMs and a teleoperated AGS-30 grenade launcher. This new format has been named to the "Algerian Terminator" or the "BMPT-62".
T-55AMV		Soviet Union	Main battle tank	270	T-55s upgraded to the AMV standard. Retired from armored divisions but continues to serve in mechanized infantry divisions. Equipped with Stugna-P ATGMs bought from Ukraine.
=== Infantry fighting vehicles ===
BMP-2M		Soviet Union Russia	Infantry fighting vehicle	760	Upgraded to BMP-2M "Berezhok" variant, which comprises four 9M133 Kornet-E anti-tank missiles, an AGS-30 30mm automatic grenade launcher, a 30mm 2A42 main gun designed for the BMP-2 and a PKT 7.62mm coaxial machine gun. A total of 760 such turrets were bought for upgrades, 400 were ordered in 2005 and 360 in 2014.
BMP-2		Soviet Union	Infantry fighting vehicle	220	
=== Other Armored fighting vehicles ===
BMPT-72 Terminator 2		Soviet Union; Russia	Armoured fighting vehicle	26+	Chassis from Soviet T-72 tanks. Ordered in 2016, deliveries started in 2018.
BMPT-62		Soviet Union; Russia; Algeria	Armoured fighting vehicle	13+ shown in the Algerian Military parade	Chassis from Soviet T-62 tanks fitted with a BMP-2M "Berezhok" turret. Conversion started in 2021 and was first unveiled in the 2022 parade. A total of 20 turrets for conversion have been ordered so far.
Kornet-EM		Russia	Armoured fighting vehicle	28	Equipped with Kornet EM ATGM and based on the modified chassis of the SPM-2 Tigr. Planned as a replacement for the BRDM-2.
BRDM-2		Soviet Union	Armoured reconnaissance vehicle	26	120 vehicles delivered between 1981 and 1982. 64 vehicles were later modernized to BDRM-2M and fitted with 9M113 "Konkurs" missiles for use in an anti-tank role.
Panhard AML-60		France	Armoured scout car	44	54 were delivered in 1965. In 2018 they were fitted with Kornet ATGMs, an automated turret carrying a 14.5mm KPV as well as a coaxial PKT, reinforced armor and night vision cameras.
=== Armoured personnel carrier ===
TPz Fuchs 2		West Germany Germany; Algeria	Armoured personnel carrier	1034	In early 2011, 54 Fuchs 2 worth $248 million were ordered from Rheinmetall. In 2014, 980 Fuchs 2 were ordered as part of a €2.7 billion defence deal with Rheinmetall. These will be assembled in Algeria with a planned delivery from 2015 to 2025.
Nimr II		United Arab Emirates	Infantry mobility vehicle, Self-propelled mortar	3000	A contract was signed for the production of such armored vehicles, for a total amount of 3000 vehicles. A local variant was made with a Chinese 120mm self-propelled mortar system being mounted on the HAFEET 640A 6×6 tactical vehicle.
Panhard M3		France	Armoured personnel carrier	55	
BTR-80		Soviet Union	Armoured personnel carrier	150	
BTR-60		Soviet Union	Armoured personnel carrier	250	
OT-64 SKOT		Czechoslovakia; Polish People's Republic	Amphibious armored personnel carrier	150	151 OT-64 APCs armed with a pintle-mounted machine gun and 75 OT-64A (version fitted with BRDM-2 turret) ordered from the Czech Republic in 1993 and delivered between 1994 and 1995, they were initially unarmed however they were sold through Slovakia where they were rearmed.
BCL-M5		Algeria; Germany - (License motor)	Armoured personnel carrier	Unknown	Designed and made locally at the Central Logistics Base (BCL).
MaxxPro MRAP		United States	MRAP	Unknown	Used by the 116th Operational Maneuvers Regiment.
Humvee		United States	High Mobility Multipurpose Vehicle	100	Used by Special Forces.
=== Logistics and utility ===
Mercedes-Benz G-Class		Austria; West Germany Germany; Algeria	Light utility vehicle	Unknown	Built locally under license.
Mercedes-Benz Sprinter		Germany; Algeria	Light utility vehicle	Unknown	4x4 model. Built locally under license.
Mercedes-Benz Unimog		West Germany Germany; Algeria	Medium cargo truck	Unknown	Built locally under license.
Mercedes-Benz Axor		Germany; Algeria	Medium cargo truck	Unknown	Built locally under license
Mercedes-Benz Zetros		Germany; Algeria	Medium cargo truck	Unknown	Locally further developed into self-propelled artillery systems using the D-30 and MT-12 gun systems.
Mercedes-Benz Actros		Germany	Heavy cargo truck	Unknown	Built locally under license
SNVI M120		Algeria	Medium cargo truck	Unknown	
SNVI M230		Algeria	Medium cargo truck	Unknown	
SNVI M350		Algeria	Heavy cargo truck	Unknown	
=== Military engineering ===
MTU-20		Soviet Union	Armoured vehicle-launched bridge	Unknown	
IMR-2		Soviet Union	Armoured engineering vehicle	Unknown	
BREM-1		Soviet Union	Armoured recovery vehicle	Unknown	
M58 MICLIC		United States	Mine-clearing line charge	Unknown	
Liebherr G-BKF		Switzerland; West Germany Switzerland; Germany	Armoured recovery crane	Unknown	

== Artillery ==
Model	Image	Origin	Type	Number	Notes
=== Self-propelled artillery ===
PLZ-45		China	155 mm self-propelled artillery	~54	
2S1 Gvozdika		Soviet Union	122 mm self-propelled artillery	140	
2S3 Akatsiya		Soviet Union	152 mm self-propelled artillery	30	
=== Towed artillery ===
D-44		Soviet Union	85 mm anti-tank gun	80	
MT-12		Soviet Union	100 mm anti-tank gun	10	Fitted on 6x6 Mercedes-Benz Zetros vehicle
D-30		Soviet Union	122 mm towed artillery	160	Some fitted on 6x6 Mercedes-Benz Zetros vehicle.
M-30		Soviet Union	122 mm towed artillery	60	
M-1931/37		Soviet Union	122 mm towed artillery	100	
D-74		Soviet Union	122 mm towed artillery	25	
M-46		Soviet Union	130 mm towed artillery	10	
ML-20		Soviet Union	152 mm towed artillery	20	
WA-021		China	155 mm towed artillery	18	
=== Mortars ===
M-37		Soviet Union	82 mm mortar	150	
W86		China	120 mm mortar	Unknown	The mortars can be seen mounted on Mercedes G-Class.
SM-4		China	120 mm self-propelled mortar	Unknown	SM-4 120 mm self-propelled mortar is based on a 6x6 WMZ-551 amphibious armoured personnel carrier.
120-PM-43 mortar		Soviet Union	120 mm mortar	120	
160mm Mortar M1943		Soviet Union	160 mm mortar	60	
=== Tactical ballistic missile systems ===
Iskander-E		Russia	Tactical ballistic missile	48 Launchers	4 regiments received from 2014 to 2017. 75 missiles received
=== Rocket artillery ===
TOS-1A		Russia	220 mm multiple rocket launcher	52	
SR-5		China	122 mm/220 mm multiple rocket launcher	70	
BM-30 Smerch		Soviet Union	300 mm multiple rocket launcher	18	
BM-21 Grad		Soviet Union	122 mm multiple rocket launcher	48	
=== Anti-aircraft artillery ===
Pantsir-S1/SM		Russia	Medium-range SAM	108	38 Pantsir-S1, and an unknown number of Pantsir-SM. With up to 900 57E6 missiles. 20km range.
ZPU-2/4		Soviet Union	Anti-aircraft autocannon	100	60 ZPU-2; 40 ZPU-4
ZU-23-2		Soviet Union	Anti-aircraft autocannon	100	
ZSU-23-4 Shilka		Soviet Union	Self-propelled anti-aircraft weapon	~225	210 were modernized to SHILKA-M with the Igla missile system.

== Small arms ==
Model	Image	Origin	Type	Cartridge	Notes
=== Pistols ===
Caracal F		United Arab Emirates	Semi-automatic pistol	9×19mm Parabellum	Standard service pistol. Produced locally under license.
Beretta 92		Italy	Semi-automatic pistol	9×19mm Parabellum	Beretta 92FS. Used by special forces
Glock 17 & 18		Austria	Semi-automatic pistol	9×19mm Parabellum	Used by elite units and special forces.
=== Submachine guns ===
Heckler & Koch MP7		Germany	Submachine gun	4.6×30mm HK	Used by special forces
Heckler & Koch MP5		West Germany	Submachine gun	9×19mm Parabellum	A3, A5 and K versions. Used by Special Forces.
Beretta M12		Italy	Submachine gun	9×19mm Parabellum	Used by Special forces
CS/LS7		China	Submachine gun	9×19mm Parabellum	Produced locally
=== Assault rifles, battle rifles and carbines ===
Heckler & Koch G36		Germany	Assault rifle	5.56×45mm NATO	G36C For Special Intervention Detachment, Directorate of Security and Presidential Protection, Algerian Special Forces
M16A4		United States	Assault rifle	5.56×45mm NATO	150+ acquired, used by Special Forces.
Steyr AUG		Austria	Assault rifle	5.56×45mm NATO	Used by Special Forces.
Beretta ARX160		Italy	Assault rifle	5.56×45mm NATO / 7.62×39mm	ARX160 in service in both 5.56×45mm and 7.62×39mm calibre used by the Algerian special forces and the presidential guard, beginning 2014.
Beretta BM 59		Italy	Battle rifle	7.62×51mm NATO	
AKM		Soviet Union	Assault Rifle	7.62×39mm	Main service rifle. AKM and AKMS variants are made locally under license, designated as PM 89, and PM 89-1 respectively.
AK-47		Soviet Union	Assault rifle	7.62×39mm	
SKS		Soviet Union; China	Semi-automatic carbine	7.62×39mm	Both supplied by the Soviet Union, and the Type-56 SKS supplied by China.
AK-103		Russia	Assault rifle	7.62×39mm	Used by Para-Commandos.
=== Sniper rifles ===
SVD (Dragunov)		Soviet Union	Sniper rifle	7.62×54mmR	Standard service Marksman rifle. Produced locally under license. will be replaced by Zastava M93.
Zastava M93 Black Arrow		Serbia	Sniper rifle	12.7×108mm	
=== Machine guns ===
M60E4		United States	General-purpose machine gun	7.62×51mm	
PKM		Soviet Union	General purpose machine gun	7.62×54mmR	
RPK		Soviet Union	Light machine gun	7.62×39mm	Produced locally under license.
RPD		Soviet Union	Light machine gun	7.62×39mm	Produced locally under license.
RP-46		Soviet Union	Light machine gun	7.62×54mmR	
DShK		Soviet Union	Heavy machine gun	12.7×108mm	
=== Grenade launchers ===
RPG-7		Soviet Union	Rocket-propelled grenade launcher	40 mm (launcher only, warhead diameter varies)	RPG-7V variant. Produced locally under license.
RPG-29		Russia	Rocket-propelled grenade launcher	105 mm	
RPG-30		Russia	Rocket-propelled grenade launcher	105 mm	
=== MANPADS ===
9K338 Igla-S		Soviet Union	Man-portable air-defense system	72 mm	
QW-2 SAEK		Algeria	MANPADS	72 mm	Indigenous design based on the Chinese QW-2.
9K32 Strela-2		Soviet Union	Man-portable air-defense system	75 mm	
=== Recoilless rifles ===
B-10		Soviet Union	Recoilless rifle	82 mm	120
B-11		Soviet Union	Recoilless rifle	107 mm	60
=== Anti-tank guided missiles ===
MILAN		France; Germany	Anti-tank guided missile	115 mm	
9M111M Fagot-M		Soviet Union	Anti-tank guided missile	120 mm	200 delivered in 1982. 4290 delivered between 1995 and 1996 for BMP-2 IFV.
AT-3 Sagger		Soviet Union	Anti-tank guided missile	125 mm	9000 delivered between 1973 and 1986
9K115-2 Metis-M1		Russia	Anti-tank guided missile	130 mm	500 delivered between 2006 and 2013
Skif		Ukraine	Anti-tank guided missile	130 mm	Signed a supply contract in 2016.
HJ-12		China	Anti-tank guided missile	135 mm	100 received in 2020
9M133 Kornet		Russia	Anti-tank guided missile	152 mm	Over 8,000 missiles were ordered from Russia . Produced locally under the name "BARK".
KM-1M Krasnopol-M2		Russia	High precision laser-guided artillery system	155 mm	Simulator of a complex of means of automated fire control of artillery subunits "Malachite" (index KM-15) spotted in Algeria.

== Air Defense ==
Model	Image	Origin	Type	Number	Notes
S-400		Russia	Long range	16 brigades (2022)	A video showcasing the weapons in action during a test has been released online by the Algerian Defense Ministry.
S-300PMU2		Russia	Long range	14 brigades (2022)	Also known as S-300 Favorit with a range of 195 km is capable against not just short-range ballistic missiles, but also medium-range ballistic missiles.
S-350 Vityaz		Russia	Medium range	10 Brigades (2022)	uses the 9M96 missile which is also used on the S-400 missile system
Surface-to-air missiles
Buk-MK2		Russia	Medium range	48 Buk-M2 systems	The system is commonly known by its NATO reporting name, SA-15 "Gauntlet".
S-300		Soviet Union	8 regiments	Strategic air defense	One S-300 regiment consists of 12 launchers of 4 missiles.
2K12		Soviet Union	Unknown	Medium-range SAM	
Pantsir-S1/SM		Russia	108	Air defense short and medium-term	
Tor M2		Soviet Union	48 systems	Short-range SAM	
9K31 Strela-1		Soviet Union	20 systems	Short-range SAM	
S-125 Neva		Soviet Union	36 S-125	Short-range SAM	

== Command and control ==
Model	Image	Origin	Type	Number	Notes
ORION 85V6 (VEGA 85V6-A ELINT)		Russia	Electronic warfare, air defense	Unknown	
Acacia-E		Russia	Airspace Management System	Unknown	
DWL 002		China	Emitter Locating System	4	
CHL-906		China	Electronic warfare	Unknown	
Kasta 2E2		Soviet Union	3D radar	5	

== Drones ==
Algeria is the only one of nine African countries manufacture drones domestically:

Model	Image	Origin	Type	Number	Notes
Kronshtadt Orion		Russia	aerial reconnaissance,precision strike	Unknown	The Algerian Ministry of National Defence has formally confirmed the operational deployment of the Kronshtadt Orion during "Ouragan" live fire military drills April 8th, 2026.
Black Hornet Nano		Norway	stealth Micro UAV	120	Used by 104th Operational Maneuvers Regiment
Wing Loong II		China	aerial reconnaissance,precision strike	24 units	
CH-4		China	Combat and reconnaissance drone	10	
El Djazair 54/55		United Arab Emirates/ Algeria	Combat and reconnaissance drone	Unknown	A variant of Yabhon United 40, manufactured Locally
WJ-700		China	aerial reconnaissance and precision strike	4 units	
Sakr El jazair 1		Algeria	aerial reconnaissance	Unknown	It is a local version of the Chinese AVIC AR-500B drone
ASN 209		Algeria	aerial reconnaissance, Suicide missions	Unknown	Local Production
Al Fajer L-10		Algeria	aerial reconnaissance	Unknown	
Aures 700		Algeria	aerial reconnaissance	Unknown	It was manufactured by the Advanced Technology Systems Development and Production Establishment (EDPSTA)
CH-3		China	Combat and reconnaissance drone	10	
