= Special Intervention Regiment (Algeria) =

Algerian Republican Guard special forces regiment

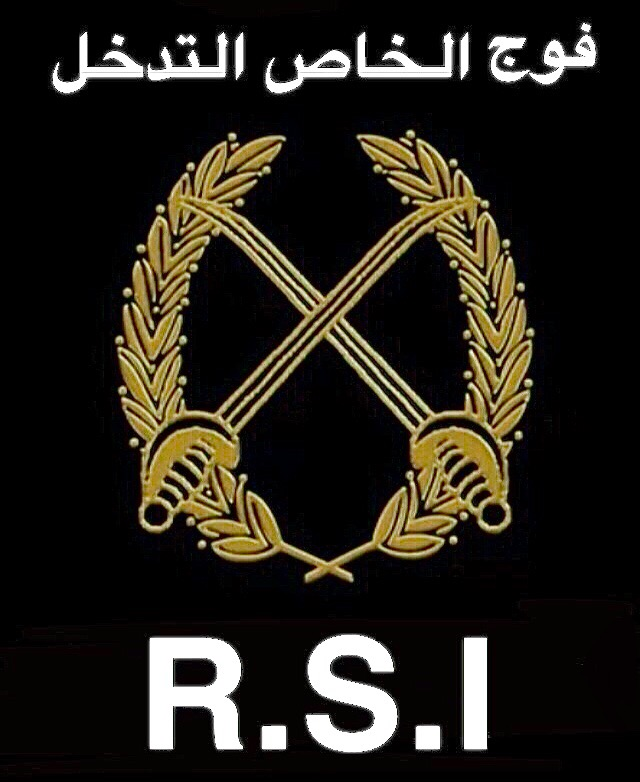
- Active: 2015-Present
- Country: Algeria
- Allegiance: Algerian Land Forces
- Branch: Algerian Republican Guard
- Type: Special forces
- Role: Antiterrorism, Hostages rescue, Special operations, Protection and escort missions

The Special Intervention Regiment, le Régiment spécial d'intervention (RSI ), in Arabic : ( فوج الخاص التدخل ), is a special forces regiment belonging to the Algerian Republican Guard based in Khemisti in the Tipaza Province.

== History ==
The Special Intervention Regiment was created in May 2015, by the former chief of staff of the Algerian army Ahmed Gaid Salah in person with the commander of the Republican Guard, the major general Ahmed Mouley Melliani.

Furthermore, it is the armed wing of the Republican Guard and the RSI is also a parachute unit since these operators are trained at the Special Troops Superior School (ESTS) in Biskra.

== Missions ==
The RSI has a various mission panel with the hostage rescue to the offensive action in mountain or in the desert, for example.

The missions of the RSI are:

- Counter-terrorism and hostage rescue
- Anti-guerilla warfare
- The neutralization of dangerous criminals or terrorists in urban, forest or desert areas.
- Close protection and escort of Very Important Persons and military personalities
- Recovery and protection of strategic areas

== Organization ==
The RSI is composed of several specialized companies with several specialized groups:

- The intervention company (with the counter terrorism group, the hostage rescue group...)
- The protection company (with the protection groups)
- The support company (with the sniper teams)
- The recognition company (with the combat divers group, and the recognition groups)
- The canine group
- The demining groups

== Training ==
The RSI's members are trained to the ESTS in Biskra for the parachuting part and for the desertic fight. Then they are trained at the commando instruction center (EFCIP) in Boghar in the Medea province where the training is devoted to field exercises, anti-guerilla combat, shooting, survival in hostile areas, and commando or specialized actions.

The RSI operators also have at their disposal the buildings and training buildings of the ICC and the 104th RMO for urban combat and for the hostage rescue drill in urban areas.

The RSI has training buildings in the headquarters in Khemisti.

In addition to this, the RSI's members regularly take part in internal exchanges with paratroopers of the Algerian army as well as with Algerian special forces (DSI, 104th RMO...).

== Equipment ==
=== Weapons ===
==== Handguns ====
- Glock 17 & 18
- Caracal

==== Assault rifles ====
- AKMs
- AKM

==== Machine guns ====
- RPD
- RPK
- PKM

==== Snipers ====
- Zatsava M93 Black Arrow
- SVD

==== Shotguns ====
- RS 202P

==== Others ====
- RPG 7

The weapon has EOTech sights with laser sights and tactical lights.

=== Individual equipment ===
- Ops core sentry xp
- Republican Guard lattice or grey suit
- Rangers
- Plate carrier
- Tactical vest
- Tactical thigh plate
- Tactical belt (brelage)
- Elbow and knee pads
- Protective goggles
- Balaclava
- Protective gloves
- Thigh holster
- Camelback
- Ghillie suit (for snipers and marksmen)

=== Vehicles ===
- Mercedes-Benz G Class of the Republican Guard
- Pick-Up Mercedes-Benz G Class in 4X4 and 6X6
- Toyota Station in 4X4 or pick-up
- Toyota Land Cruiser in 4X4 or pick-up
- BMW R1200 RT (for the escort units)
- Mercedes-Benz Zetros
- Mercedes-Benz Unimog

==== Special ====
- Fuch 2

=== Aerial transport ===
- Algerian Air Force airplanes
- Mil Mi-171Sh of the Algerian Air Force
