= Intervention and Neutralisation Groups =

The Intervention and Neutralization Group (GIN) is a specialized intervention unit of the Algerian National Gendarmerie.

This unit is part of the first degree intervention units joining the security and intervention sections (SSI) of the gendarmerie.

It is part of the gendarmerie's elite units, together with the Special Intervention Detachment (DSI) and the Security and Intervention Sections (SSI).

== History ==
The intervention and neutralisation groups were initially created in 2009, the first unit was created in the wilaya of Sidi Bel Abbès at the level of the 2nd military region.

However, it is from 2013 that most of the current units were created following the reorganization of the GIN wanted by the command of the national gendarmerie, their mission panel was thus enlarged and their organization was modified.

The GIN belongs to the intervention group (IG), which is the gendarmerie's riot control and law enforcement unit,2 and the groups are stationed directly at IG headquarters.

GIN units are therefore currently found in the wilayas of Sidi Bel Abbès, Algiers, Blida, Jijel and Tipaza and other wilayas in Algeria.

They have joined the Security and Intervention Sections (SSI) with whom they work jointly.

In addition, some SSI units have been merged with GIN units as was the case in Algiers and Blida.

The SSI and GIN units are quite similar in terms of equipment and are easily confused by the population, however their mission panels are quite different from each other.

== Organization ==
The GIN is thus positioned within the IG units spread all over Algeria, each group has several specialized units such as dog units, hostage release units, law enforcement.

== Missions ==
The GIN's mission is:

- Supporting law enforcement and riot control units during demonstrations or events
- Support for territorial brigades to contribute to security and the preservation of public order
- Operational support to members of the Special Response Detachment (SDR) or Task Forces (TF) in major crises
- The fight against illicit trafficking
- Intervention in Public Order Disorder Situations
- The arrest of specialized criminal groups and gangs
- The antigang
- Escorting dangerous detainees or high-profile individuals
- The fight against terrorism and the release of hostages in a confined or other environment
- The "hard" arrest in the homes of criminals

== Training and coaching ==
GIN members are recruited directly into IG units or directly into gendarmerie brigades, they are therefore trained at the level of the special intervention detachment (DSI) in combat sports, shooting, combat in urban and semi-urban areas.

Some members are also trained in parachuting at the level of the Higher School for Special Troops (ESTS) in Biskra as well as in commando techniques at the Commando Training and Parachuting Initiation School (EFCIP) in Boghar.

In addition, every year a large-scale exercise is held in each military region where these are evaluated.
