= Directorate General of Security =

The Directorate General of Security is a national agency of many nations:

- Directorate-General for Security (Spain)
- Directorate of General Security
- Directorate General of Security (India)

== See also ==
- Directorate of Security and Presidential Protection
