= Personality Protection and Security Service =

The Personality Protection and Security Service (SPS) is an Algerian police service responsible for the close protection and escort of public figures.

== History ==
The SPS was created in 1992 in the midst of the civil war.

The Algerian state via the DGSN had decided to create a unit for close protection and escort of personalities (such as ministers...).

In its early days, all officers volunteered to work in the SPS.

Nevertheless, this service is to be distinguished from the DGSPP, which belongs to the Algerian Republican Guard, and is responsible for the protection of the President of the Republic, while the SPS is responsible for the security of Algerian ministers and their staff, as well as their families and Algerian and foreign personalities.

== Organization ==
The SPS is an independent body, reporting directly to the DGSN cabinet.

The SPS is composed of several services:

- The traffic office (which is in charge of the main and emergency routes...)
- The close protection team (which are at the heart of the system, escorting the VIP on foot and by car and intervening directly in the event of a problem)
- The support team (which supports the protection groups, which may include snipers, plainclothes officers and "back up" agents)
- The extraction team (which evacuates the VIP out of the combat zone in the event of an ambush)
- The logistics department

== Training ==
As the mission of protecting VIPs is very delicate, sensitive and complex, DGSN command has always insisted that SPS members be over-trained: the operational level is always maintained at the highest level thanks to the specialized training regularly organized in order to comply with international norms and standards in the field of close guarding. Close protection techniques are instilled in them on a daily basis. Advanced training in karate, judo, ju-jitsu, taekwondo, kuk-sool-Won, boxing...

== Recruitment ==
To become a police officer at the SPS, you must be in good physical condition. Members of the SPS are integrated into the service if they meet specific criteria, such as the physical constitution and personality of the individual. In addition, following physical and written tests, the selection of future SPS officers is the responsibility of a "specialized" commission that decides whether or not to retain the candidate.

Selected applicants must follow a panel of specialized training courses in warfare, endurance and combat techniques at their barracks in Ben Aknoun and at the commando training and parachuting initiation school (EFCIP) in Boghar in the wilaya of Médéa, which is the training centre for commandos of the Algerian army.

The first woman joined the SPS in 1999, and some ministers such as Houda-Imane Faraoun and Nouria Benghabrit use exclusively female bodyguards.

== Armament and equipment ==
=== Armament ===
SPS officers have several types of weapons that vary depending on the team, the environment and the situation, however, the following weapons are generally used:

==== Handguns ====
- Glock 17 & 18
- Smith&wesson MP9
- Beretta 92 (more often used for instruction or training)

==== Machine pistols ====
- HK-MP5
- Beretta M12 (most often used for instruction or training)

==== Assault rifles ====
- AKM
- AKMS

==== Others ====
- Grenades (Flash, deafening, dispersal...)
- Smoke grenades
- Combat knife

=== Individual equipment ===
The bodyguards of close protection groups are very often dressed in suits and with no visible weapons.

- Costume
- Communication headset
- Radio
- Bullet-proof vest
- Protective goggles
- Hip Holster
- Bulletproof Kevlar protective case
- Telescopic stick
- Protective umbrella

For support teams :

- Support units, unlike their close protection colleagues, are not in suits but in tactical uniforms.
- Dark blue suit
- Bullet-proof vest
- Tactical vest
- Communication headset
- Hip or Thigh Holster
- Helmet
- Radio
- Telescopic stick

=== Vehicles ===
SPS vehicles are often black with black tinted windows, and armoured vehicles (usually the car carrying the VIP, the extraction car and some cars in the convoy) can be found in the convoy.

However, you can also find unmarked cars for the so-called discreet escorts within the SPS.
