= Parachute Commando Regiments =

Algerian military unit

Parachute commando regiments
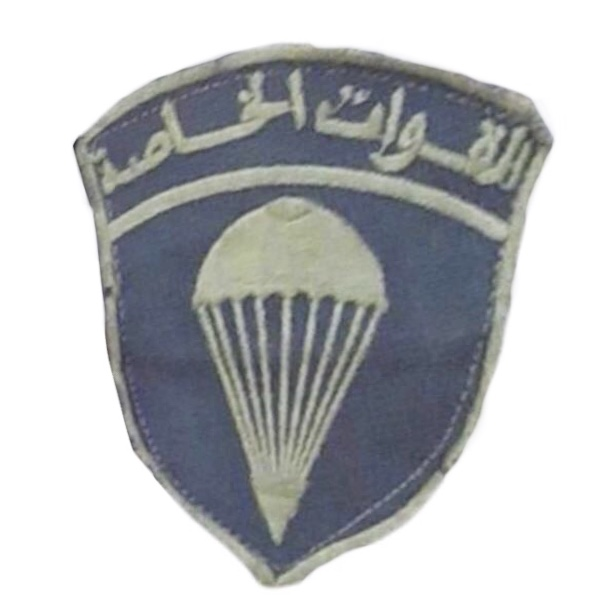
- Country: Algeria
- Type: Airborne infantry
- Role: Special Forces Support Parachute Insertion Quick reaction force
- Engagements: Algerian civil war, Tiguentourine crisis

The Parachute Commandos Regiments (RPC) are Algerian parachute regiments.

The regiments are part of the 17th Parachute Division of Biskra of the land forces of the Algerian People's National Army.

The regiments are "special troops" regiments by virtue of their missions and status.

== History ==
The parachutists of the Algerian Army were not in the form of regiments but of groups. The first parachutist regiments were formed in the 1980s. The first regiments were the 4th, 12th and 18th RPC. The 1st RPC and the 5th RPC were created in 1995.

The regiments were integrated into the Centre de Conduite et de Coordination des Actions de Lutte Anti-Subversive (CLAS) in 1995. The 6th RPC is the last regiment to be created as it was created in 2009.

The parachute commandos belong to the 17th Parachute Division, which is a predominantly infantry division but with more sensitive missions than the infantry regiments.

The 17th Parachute Division, created in 1991 by decree, is specialized in airborne combat and air assault, its main mission being emergency projection.

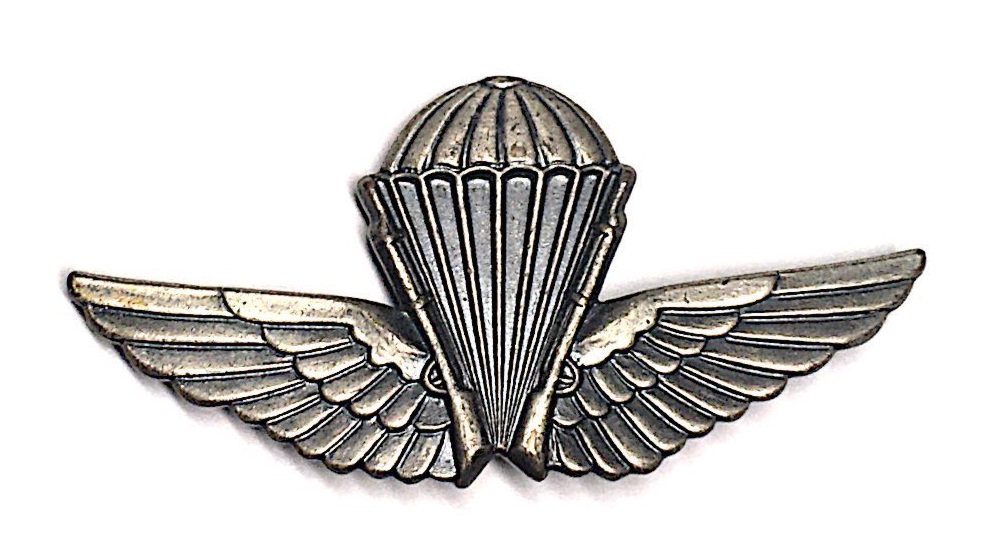
Insigna of the paratroopers of the Algerian army

== Organization ==
The commando parachute regiments are composed of 6 parachute regiments and 3 auxiliary units:

- Staff of the 17th Parachute Division (17th PD) in Biskra
- 1st Commandos Parachute Regiment of Tébessa (1st RPC)
- 4th Commandos Parachute Regiment of Laghouat (4th RPC)
- 5th Commandos Parachute Regiment of Ain Arnat (5th RPC)
- 6th Commando Parachute Regiment of Jijel (6th RPC)
- 12th Commando Parachute Regiment of Biskra (12th RPC)
- 18th Commandos Parachute Regiment of Hassi-Messaoud (18th RPC)
- 1 Parachute Artillery Regiment
- 1 Parachute Engineer Battalion
- 1 Parachute Anti-Tank Battalion

The regiments have a strength of about 700 men, between 9000 and 10000 paratroopers for the 17th DP.

Airborne intervention is the main mode of action of parachutists, they are capable of engaging under armored protection with BTR-80s or Fuchs 2s and tactical reconnaissance vehicles in a short time, and with weapons and equipment that can be dropped or heliborne into a combat zone.

Each regiment has :

- 1 General Staff
- 3 Fighting Companies
- 1 Logistics Company
- 1 Anti-tank Company
- 1 Support Company
- 1 Transmission Company
- 1 Air Defence Company

The 12th RPC is a specialized regiment, with two special operations companies (41st and 45th companies) and specialized sections similar to the French Army's Commando Parachute Group (GCP) or the U.S. 75th Ranger Regiment.

The regiments are the elite parachute regiment for conventional forces (excluding special forces).

== Missions ==
Parachute commandos act primarily in the air-land environment, the parachutists provide the material and human resources to carry out the missions, and the commandos work directly with the other units.

Parachute commandos have the following missions :

- Strategic and special reconnaissance
- Commando action
- Counter-terrorism
- Special Operations Air Mobile Support and Support (in collaboration with Special Forces)
- VIP close protection
- The recovery and protection of strategic objectives

The RPC is very much present in border security missions, particularly on the Libyan border.

The RPC have the status of "special troops" that are the equivalent of the 75th Ranger Regiment.

== Training and coaching ==
Parachute cadets are trained at the Special Troops Training Centre (CFTS) (for non-commissioned men) which is part of the Special Troops Superior School (ESTS) (which trains non-commissioned officers and officers) in Biskra, where they are trained in:

- Weapons handling: pistol shooting and automatic rifle, among others.
- Fighting in urban, desert, and forest areas, among others.
- Survival in hostile environments.
- Sabotage and demolitions.
- Skydiving.
- Fighting with bare hands and knives (with handguns or throwing).
- Close combat, kuk sool won is taught to future parachutists.
- Special operations techniques (reconnaissance operations, parachuting, patrolling inside enemy lines, intelligence gathering...).

At the end of the course, the student is subject to a diploma examination.

Some will go for advanced training at the commandos training centre (EFCIP) in Boghar.

Para-commando units are organized on the model of the Russian Spetsnaz, and many officers and non-commissioned officers have undergone additional and specialized training in South Korea, China, South Africa, the United Kingdom, the United States, Italy, Germany, Russia, and France.

The level of training there is advanced in all areas of individual and collective combat (close combat, shooting, sabotage, camouflage, reconnaissance, parachuting, interrogation of prisoners, etc.).

== Equipment and armament ==
=== Armament ===
==== Handguns ====
- Glock 17 & 18
- Caracal

==== Assault rifle ====
- AKMS
- AKM
- AK-103

==== Machine gun ====
- RPD
- RPK
- PKM

==== Precision rifle ====
- Zatsava M93 Black Arrow
- SVD
- HK-G3
- M40A3

==== Shotgun ====
- SR 202P

==== Other ====
- RPG-7
- RPG-29
- METIS-M1
- KORNET-E
- SA-18
- QW-2
- AGS-17
- AGS-30

=== Personal equipment ===
- Spectra helmet, Fast-ops core
- Special troops lattice (lizard, desert woodland)
- Tactical vest
- Bullet-proof vest
- Plate carrier
- Gloves
- Knee and elbow pads
- Thigh or Belt Holster
- Rangers
- Protective goggles
- Camelback
- Fighting bag

=== Vehicles ===
- Mercedes-Benz G Class in 4X4 and pick-up
- Toyota Station in 4X4 or Pick-up
- Toyota Land Cruiser in 4X4 or Pick-up
- Mercedes-Benz Zetros
- Ford F150
- Mercedes-Benz Unimog
- SNVI M 120
- SNVI M 230
- SNVI M 260

==== Special vehicle ====
- Humvee
- Ford F-150 with Mobile Adjustable Ramp System (MARS)
- BTR 80
- Otokar Akrep
- Fuchs 2
