= Air Commando Rifle Regiments =

Specialized regiments in the Algerian Air Force

772nd Air Commandos Rifle Regiment
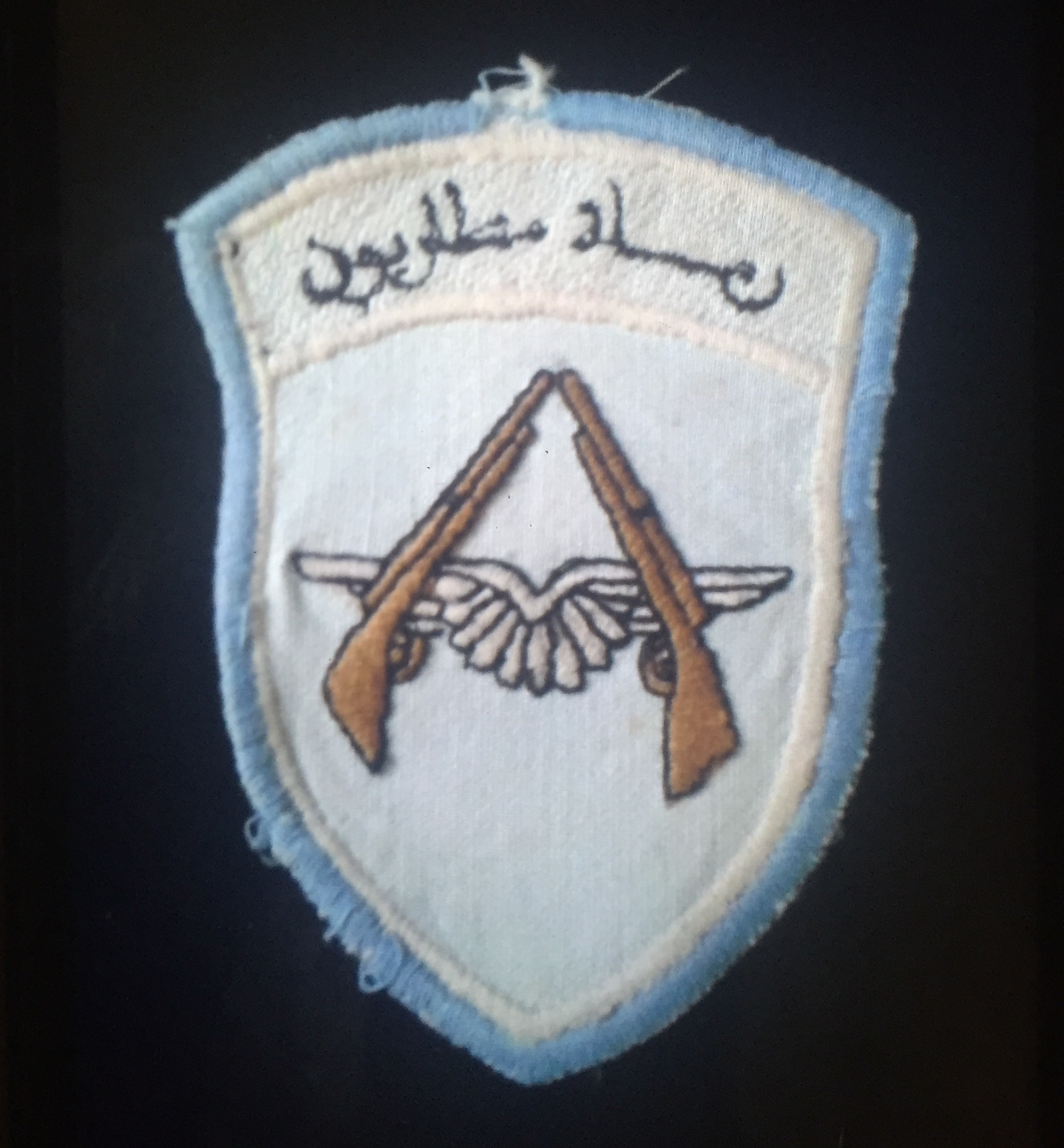
- Founded: 1992
- Service branches: Algerian Air Force

Leadership
- De facto leader: Abdelmajid Tebboune

The air commando rifle regiments are specialized regiments belonging to the Algerian Air Force.

== History and service ==
Air commando rifle units dates back to the 1970s, when a special air component was proposed to President Houari Boumediène. In 1990, the first air commando riflemen began training at the National School of Air Technology in Blida. Non-commissioned Algerian Air Force officers also trained there. Commando riflemen training was later transferred to the Air Rifle Training Centre in Mechria and in 1992, the first regiments appeared in the Air Force under Major General Benslimani. This followed the release of the first promotion of air rifle commandos.

As of 2021, the Algerian Air Force has six regiments of air fusilier commandos and battalions of air fusiliers to protect airbases across different military regions. Now, initial training, which involves parachuting, weapons handling, close combat techniques, and shooting from helicopters, is held at the Fusiliers Commandos de l'Air in Mechria. Following training, they are certified; soldiers then undergo additional selection, training, and education within their regiments.

The 772nd Regiment is the only special forces regiment and is based in Aïn Oussera, though the 782nd regiment, located in Laghouat, is also considered an elite unit. The air commandos also have specialized units such as dog units. These spearheaded the Air Force and were heavily involved in the fight against terrorism during the Black Decade, particularly in the mountains. They are still heavily involved in these operations today. Air commando rifle regiments generally work on reconnaissance missions, human intelligence, air support, search and rescue operations, helicopter-borne shooting, hostage release, neutralization, sabotage, seizure and reinstatement of airport areas, recognition or destruction of targets, and combat search and rescue. Police dog teams search for explosive materials or weapons.

== Armament and equipment ==
Air commando rifle regiments use a number of guns and assault weapons, including handguns (Glock 17s and Caracal pistols), assault rifles (AKMs and AKMS), machine guns (RPD machine guns, RPKs, and PK machine guns), precision rifles (Zastava M93 Black Arrow and Dragunov sniper rifles), shotguns (SR202Ps), and grenade launchers (RPG-7s). They are issued a SPECTRA helmet, protection glasses, an Algerian Army lattice, an Algerian Air Force lattice sata, gloves, knee and elbow pads, a bullet-proof vest, a tactical vest, a thigh or hip holster, and a balaclava. Some soldiers use night vision binoculars; thermal, infrared binoculars, sights, lasers, and lamps. Air commando rifle regiments typically use Air Force airplanes and Mil Mi-17s in the air and Mercedes-Benz G Class, Zetros, Unimogs, and SNVI M120s on the ground.
