= 116th Operational Maneuvers Regiment =

167th Operational Maneuvers Regiment
- Arabic: الفوج 116 للمناورات العملياتية; French: 116e Régiment de Manœuvres Opérationnelles
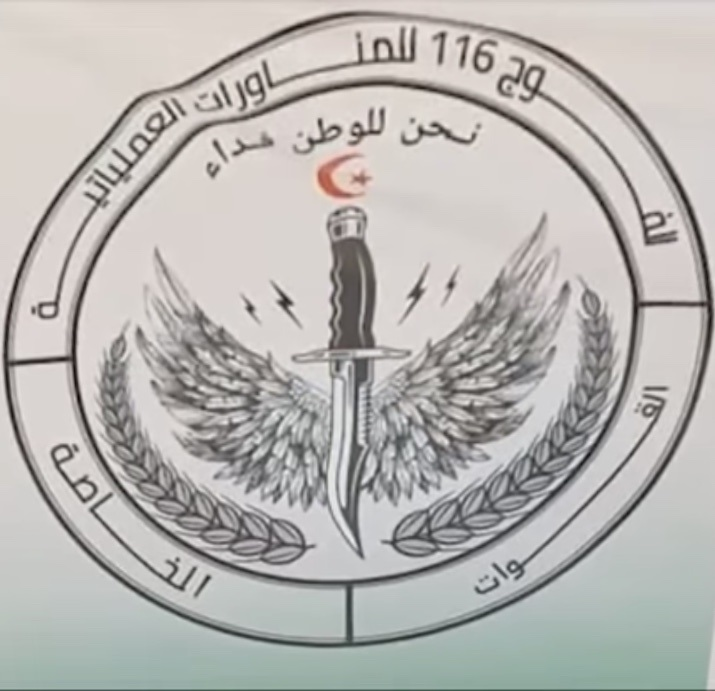
- Badge of the 116th RMO
- Active: 2015 - present
- Country: Algeria
- Branch: People's National Army
- Type: Special forces

Commanders
- Current commander: Colonel Boudouh Abdelkader

The 116th Operational Maneuvers Regiment (116th RMO) (Arabic: الفوج 116 للمناورات العملياتية, French: 116e Régiment de Manœuvres Opérationnelles) is a special forces regiment of the Algerian Land Forces.

== History ==
Indeed, the 116th RMO is a recent regiment because it was created in 2015, a few months after the dissolution of the Groupement d'Intervention Spécial (GIS), this regiment was created to directly replace this unit.

Following the dissolution of the GIS, the land forces of the Algerian Army decided to create a new elite unit to replace the GIS. However, the 116th RMO has a different status because it does not depend directly on the Algerian intelligence services, as was the case for the former GIS, but it belongs directly to the command of the land forces.

They are under the direct orders of the Chief of Staff of the People's National Army, and their missions are followed up to the highest military level (the army's high command).

Moreover, the 116th RMO is the descendant of the GIS, so this regiment has naturally taken over the same missions as the latter, and is therefore capable of extremely diverse and varied operations.

The majority of operators and most of the material was transferred to this regiment.

== Missions ==
The 116th RMO specializes in counterterrorism, counter guerrilla actions, and the hunting of terrorists in hostile and complex areas, as well as in hostage rescue. However, it is also capable of extremely diverse and varied operations.

It can be tasked with protection of high military authorities, various special operations such as special reconnaissance and raids behind enemy lines, and other types of special missions.

The missions of the 116th RMO are therefore:

- Anti-guerrilla warfare
- Counterterrorism and hostage rescue
- Hunting terrorists in hostile and complex areas
- Special reconnaissance
- Capture or neutralization of HVTs, insurgents, or criminals
- Close protection and escort of high-profile individuals
- Direct action
- Special operations
- Destruction of strategic targets, sabotage
- Intervention in the marine environment
- Technical operations

== Organization ==
The regiment has several companies with several specialized groups such as HAHO/HALO groups, hostage rescue groups, combat swimmer groups or search and destroy groups.

The 116th RMO therefore has several specialized companies:

- A general staff
- Special company: with assault groups specialized in search and destroy (counterinsurgency, tracking and neutralization of terrorists), HALO/HAHO groups, snipers, reconnaissance and intelligence groups.
- Intervention company: with intervention groups specialized in counterterrorism and hostage rescue, and marine intervention groups (combat swimmers), support groups with marksmans, close protection groups with bodyguards.
- Technical intervention company: with demining groups, intrusion and dog groups.
- Reconnaissance company
- Logistic support company
- Training company

== Equipment and Armament ==
Operators have access to several types of weapons that are chosen according to the needs and nature of the mission.

Each operator is equipped with a primary weapon (usually an assault rifle), a handgun, and in addition to this, various types of grenades (fragmentation, smoke, blinding, etc.).

Marksmans and snipers have a multitude of choices with regard to their weaponry, ranging from small and medium calibers to large calibers used for immaterial fire, which allows them to destroy light equipment, especially with heavy calibers such as the .50 caliber.

=== Handgun ===
- Glock 17,18, 19, 26&31
- Caracal

=== Submachine gun ===
- HK MP5A5
- MP5SD3
- MP5K
- MP5A3
- HK MP7

=== Assault rifle ===
- AKM
- AKMS
- HK 416
- M4

=== Machine gun ===
- PKM

=== Sniper rifle ===
- Zastava M93 Black Arrow
- Sako TRG 22
- Barret M82

=== Shotgun ===
- Beretta RS 202
- SPAS 12

=== Personal equipment ===
- Special Forces uniform (lizard, desert woodland, and desert MARPAT)
- Footwear: Tactical boots
- Helmet: Fast ops core Helmet
- Plate carrier
- Tactical thigh plate
- Tactical belt
- Elbow and knee pads
- Protective goggles
- Hood
- Protective gloves
- Thigh Holster
- Camelback
- Ghillie follows (for snipers and marksmen)

=== Special ===
- CBRN Alert Protective Mask
- Bullet shield
- Night vision apparatus
- SWORD T&D viewfinder
- Night and infrared sights
- Individual transmission apparatus
- Radios
- Headset
- Demining apparatus
- Silencers (which they place on their armaments)
- EOTech viewfinder, Aimpoint.
- Gladius 2.0 system

== Vehicles ==
- All terrain vehicles Toyota Land Cruiser, Mercedes-Benz G-Class, Unmarked vehicles

=== Special vehicles ===
- Mercedes-Benz Vario demining van
- Ford F-150 All Terrain Vehicle with Mobile Adjustable Ramp System (MARS)
- MRAP (Mine Resistant Ambush Protected) International Maxxpro
- 4x4 jamming vehicle Mercedes-Benz G-Class and Toyota Land Cruiser

== Aerial ==
- Mil Mi-171Sh of the Algerian Air Force
- Transport aircraft belonging to the Algerian Air Force (C130, Casa C295, Il-76...)
