= Safety and Intervention Sections =

- Founded: 2005
- Service branches: Algerian Gendarmerie
- Headquarters: Algiers

Leadership
- Commander-in-Chief: général Abderrahmane Araar

Personnel
- Active personnel: 4200

The security and intervention sections are specialized units belonging to the Algerian National Gendarmerie.

== History ==
The SSIs were created in December 2005 by the command of the Algerian National Gendarmerie.

The SSI was created to support the DSI and the intervention group (IM) that previously did this work, and is therefore dedicated to the fight against terrorism and organised crime.

These units have been specially trained to free hostages, apprehend dangerous individuals, dismantle gangs, penetrate and secure sensitive areas, and carry out punch actions.

The first SSIs were notably positioned in Blida, Souk-Ahras and Boumerdès before expanding throughout the country.

Today, there are about 120 SSIs spread over 47 wilayas, with 4200 men.

Eventually, the SSIs should be present in all 48 wilayas of the country and should number 161.

== Missions ==
The mission of the SSI is,:

- Execute surveillance patrols in areas of insecurity and predilection for violence and banditry
- The apprehension and identification of dangerous or wanted individuals (at home or on the public highway)
- Checking and searching suspicious vehicles
- The control of places that may harbour illicit activities such as illicit trafficking... and that may serve as a refuge for criminals
- Operational support to the Special Intervention Detachment (DSI) in the event of hostage-taking .
- Counter-terrorism and hostage release
- First response (SSI is the first to respond to a serious incident before specialized units arrive on site)
- The dismantling of gangs and illicit trafficking

== Training and education ==
The SSIs are part of the elite units of the Algerian security forces, and the latter are directly trained in the DSI, which is none other than the equivalent of the GIGN in Algeria.

To join the SSI, one must be a confirmed gendarme with a few years of service to his credit to be able to access the selection process which takes place at the DSI during 1 week.

During the training week, gendarmes will be evaluated on physical, mental and technical levels. They will have 60 hours of tests day and night, such as climbing a slippery and high facade of about 40m, they will have to implement their combat techniques learned in their schools, shooting, weapons handling, risk course etc.

Those who pass this week of selection will continue for 5 weeks at the DSI where they will be trained in climbing, combat techniques (ju-jitsu, kuk-sool-won...), and the use of weapons. ), shooting, weapons handling, confidence shooting with live ammunition, approach techniques, physical and armed confrontation, special vehicle piloting, control and identification of suspect individuals and vehicles, hostage release techniques, urban and forest combat, assault techniques in closed and open environments etc.

If the gendarme passes all these tests during a final rally, he will be awarded the SSI pin and his diploma and will be incorporated into one of the 120 SSI.

However, once he has arrived in his section, he will be trained again within his section on certain specialities that his section may have before being fully operational.

== Organization ==
The SSIs are positioned in 99% of the Algerian territory, i.e. in 47 of the 48 wilayas, each section has 35 men, making a total of 4,200 men.

Each wilaya grouping of the Gendarmerie generally includes an SSI, commanded by a non-commissioned officer or sometimes by an officer.

The wilaya of Algiers has the largest number of SSIs with 6 sections for the entire wilaya, only the wilaya of Tindouf does not have an SSI at the moment, which in the medium term should have its own SSI unit.

Moreover, some members are trained in parachuting at the Higher School for Special Troops (ESTS) in Biskra or in commando techniques at the Commando Training and Parachuting Initiation School (EFCIP) in Boghar.

The SSI also has canine units, as well as a number of bomb disposal specialists (about 1-2 per platoon) and precision shooters.

== Weapons and equipment ==
=== Armament ===
Like the gendarmes, SSIs are part of the special units of the Algerian gendarmerie, the latter have a different armament from their colleagues in the mobile gendarmerie.

==== Handguns ====
- Makarov PM
- Caracal
- Glock 17&18
- Beretta 92

==== Assault rifles ====
- AKM
- AKMS

==== Shotguns ====
- SR 202P

==== Precision rifles ====
- Zatsava M93 Black Arrow
- SVD

==== Machine guns ====
- RPD
- RPK
- PKM

==== Individual equipment ====
- Green Tactical Suit
- Spectra Helmet
- Bullet-proof vest
- Tactical vest
- Tactical Belt
- Thigh or Hip Holster
- Hood
- Rangers
- Handcuffs
- Tactical knife
- Protective gloves
- Protective goggles or mask

=== Vehicles ===
- 4X4 Toyota land cruiser of the gendarmerie
- 4X4 Mercedes-Benz G-Class from the police department
- 4X4 Nissan patrol de la gendarmerie
- 4x4 Hyundai Santa Fe
- Unmarked vehicles
