= Police Special Operations Group =

Elite unit of the Algerian police

- Groupement des Opérations Spéciales de la Police (French) جمهرة العمليات الخاصة للشرطة (Arabic)
- Active: 22 July 2016 - present
- Country: Algeria
- Agency: Algerian police
- Type: Police tactical unit
- Headquarters: Boudouaou
- Abbreviation: GOSP

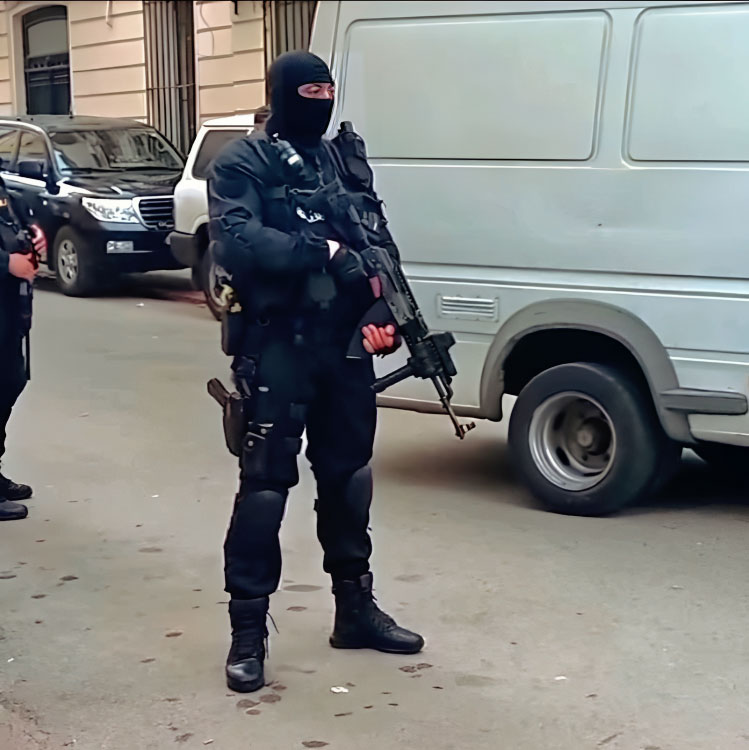
A GOSP police officer during a protection and escort mission.

The Police Special Operations Group (French: Groupement des Opérations Spéciales de la Police, GOSP; Arabic: جمهرة العمليات الخاصة للشرطة) is a police tactical unit of the Algerian police.

== History ==
In March 2015, the idea of creating a police task force was born. Moreover, the former Algerian police Chief Abdelghani Hamel, who had visited the RAID in France earlier, confirmed that the police would need a group like the French RAID.

The vast majority of GOSP members come from police task forces such as the BRI (Brigade de recherche et d'intervention) or the BMPJ (Brigade mobile de la Police judiciaire). However, a few members come from Unités de Maintien de l'Ordre (UMO) and other police forces.

GOSP police officers are trained in the DSI (Special Intervention Detachment), which is the Algerian equivalent of the French GIGN. They are trained in urban, semi-urban, closed environment and close combat.

== Organization ==
Placed under the direct authority of the director general of the Algerian police, the GOSP is called upon to intervene in the event of serious events, requiring the use of specific techniques and means to neutralize dangerous individuals, through negotiation or intervention. The GOSP is the Algerian equivalent of the French RAID.

The GOSP headquarters is positioned in Boudouaou in the Boumerdès Province east of Algiers with between 300 and 500 members. In addition, this unit may be supported by BRI in the police or SSI units of the gendarmerie.

Moreover, the GOSP has several groups with their specialties :

- Intervention group
- Support group
- Recognition and intelligence group
- Technical group
- aquatic group (with combat divers)
- Aeral group
- Medic group
- Canine group
- Deminers group

== Missions ==
The missions of the GOSP are:

- Urban counter-terrorism and hostage rescue
- Neutralization of dangerous fanatics or criminals
- Participation in criminal police operations
- Escort and transfer of dangerous detainees
- Close protection and the escort of high-profile personalities.
- Civilian assistance mission
- Involvement in anti-gang operations

== Training ==
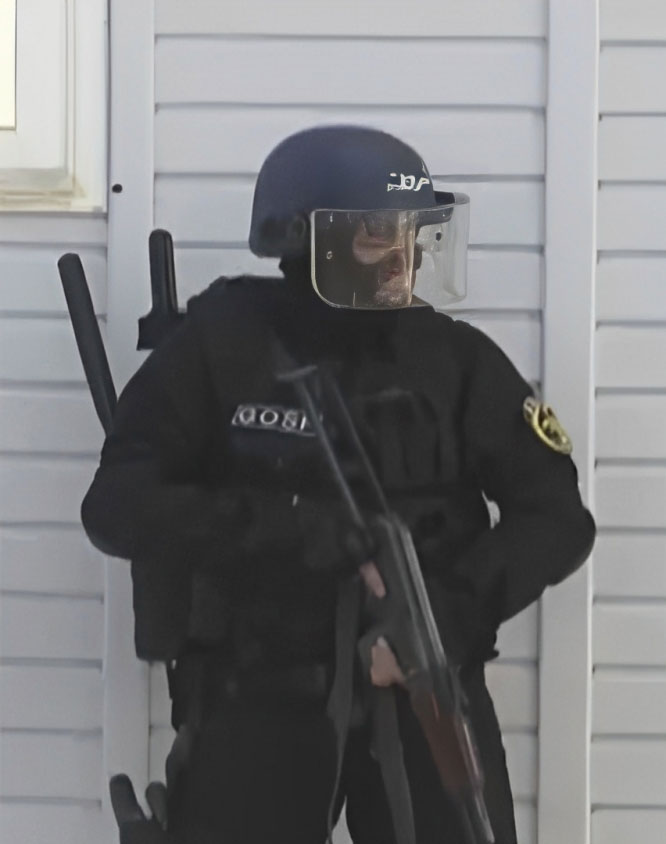
A GOSP member during a training.

The GOSP have drawn much inspiration from Western intervention groups.

The GOSP has a permanent training with the others Algerian corp security like the DSI or the militaries units, and they are trained in Portugal with the GOE, in Spain with the GEO, in Germany with the GSG-9, and in France in the RAID.

Once a year every year the gosp carries out large-scale simulations and training in airports these simulations revolve around the resolution of taking hostages in Tébessa in 2019 or a hostage crisis in an airplane with clearing landmines as in Béjaïa in 2017, and in Constantine in 2018.

Its realistic simulations are made to judge the operational level of the GOSP and the reaction time of the unit.

GOSP also trains foreign groups such as the Lesotho Police Task Forces and In 2017, they carried out an exchange programme with Portuguese GEO police officers where the latter had come to Algeria for training and GOSP members were also in Portugal for training and it has become an internationally recognized unit, and the President of Interpol praised the professionalism of the members of the GOSP.

The GOSP also carried out exchanges with the Portuguese and Spanish groups and the French police.

They have trained these groups, particularly in mine clearance.

== Notorious operations ==
On 15 October 2019, the assault in Tabia, in the Sidi Bel Abbès province, neutralized an entrenched fanatic who had murdered his ex-wife and four members of his in-laws on 11 October in Sidi Lahcene. The forcible is a senior police inspector at the wilaya security. Seriously injured, he died during his transfer to the Sidi Bel Abbès University Hospital.
