= BMPT-62 =

- Type: Heavy Tank Support / Fire Support Combat Vehicle
- Place of origin: Soviet Union - chassis Russia / Algeria

Service history
- Used by: Algeria, Ukraine

Production history
- Developed from: T-62
- Variants: Algerian Variant, Ukrainian Variant

Specifications
- Length: 6.63 metres
- Crew: 3
- Armor: Hull armor of the T-62, turret armor of the BMP-2
- Main armament: 30 mm 2A42 automatic cannon, 4 - 9M133 Kornet-E launchers
- Secondary armament: 1 - 7.62 mm PKTM General-purpose machine gun, 1 - 30 mm AGS-30M Automatic Grenade launcher
- Engine: V-55 or V-55V 12-cylinder water-cooled diesel engine 580 horsepower
- Suspension: Tracked suspension
- Maximum speed: ~50 km/h (Maintains standard T-62 speed parameters but benefits from an increased power-to-weight ratio due to the lighter overall mass)

The BMPT-62 is an Experimental Algerian Fire Support vehicle which uses the Soviet made T-62 as its basis.

== History ==
Between 1977 and 1979, Algeria acquired roughly 330 Soviet T-62 Tanks and realized over time that the T-62s that Algeria got were being replaced by more advanced Russian armor such as the T-72M1 and T-90SA, so in turn they increasingly relegated T-62 tanks to Rear-guard patrols or storage.

By the late 2010s, the Algerian military faced an engineering dilemma with the old 115 mm U-5TS smoothbore guns on the T-62 becoming obsolete and difficult to source ammunition for. Impressed by the heavy armor and high-volume firepower doctrine of the BMPT Terminator, but wanting a cost-effective solution to recycle their stored T-62 hulls, Algerian leadership authorized a domestic conversion project between 2010 and 2020. The conversion from T-62 to the BMPT-62 was spearheaded by Algerian engineers at the military's Base Centrale Logistique (Central Logistics Base, BCL) under high secrecy.

The world first learned of the vehicle's existence in late August 2021 via leaked internet photos of shrouded prototypes, the vehicle made its official, unmasked public debut on July 5, 2022, during the military parade celebrating the 60th anniversary of Algeria's independence, a full formation of 12 fully serialized BMPT-62 vehicles rolled through Algiers, confirming that the concept had successfully moved past the prototype stage and entered active service within the Algerian armored divisions.

A completely separate variant emerged when Ukrainian forces began capturing intact Russian T-62 tanks, lacking the proprietary Russian Berezhok modules used by Algeria, Ukrainian field engineers built their own version out of immediate necessity.

== Specifications ==
The BMPT-62 has 2 variants, the BCL standard variant and the Ukrainian Variant.

=== Standard Algerian variant ===
The standard variant of the BMPT-62 has a Russian made "Berezhok" turret package, a 30 mm 2A42 automatic cannon, 4 Kornet-E anti-tank guided missile launchers, an AGS-30M 30mm automatic grenade launcher mounted to the rear, is Outfitted with modern multi-channel thermal optics, advanced day/night sights, and a digital ballistic computer.

=== Ukrainian variant ===
The Ukrainian Variant has a standard, salvaged BMP-2 turret, the original Soviet T-62 optics, the same 30 mm 2A42 automatic cannon and has no ATGMs, but could probably use the standard 9K111 Fagot or 9M113 Konkurs if available.
