= Research and Intervention Brigade (Algeria) =

Shock group

Research and intervention brigade
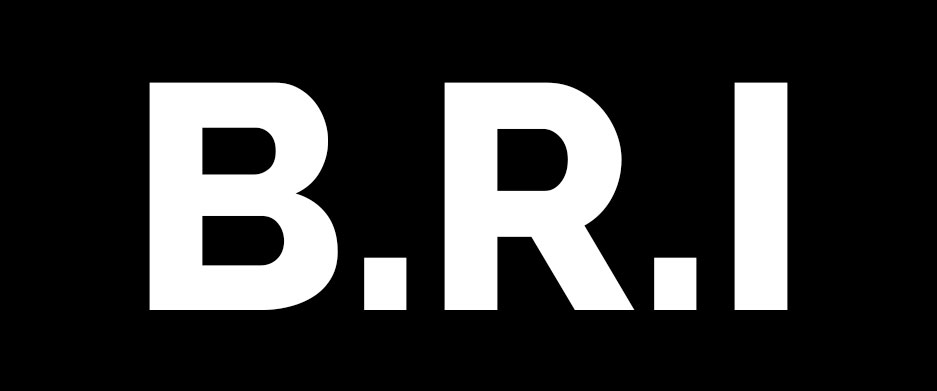
- Founded: 2005
- Service branches: Algerian police
- Headquarters: Algiers

Personnel
- Active personnel: 300

The Research and Intervention Brigade (BRI) is a shock group inspired by the French BIS. The BRI was created in 2005 to replace the Police Special Intervention Unit (UISP) which was disbanded earlier.

== History ==
The BRI officially replaced the then elite UISP in 2005. However, the BIS is affiliated to the Judicial Police, unlike the UISP, which was directly affiliated to the General Directorate of National Security (DGSN).

From 2005, the first training courses were held with the BIS in Paris, which provides "advanced" training for members of this group.

In 2007 and 2008, the Intervention Group of the French National Police provides training courses for members of the BRI. In 2008, some 40 police officers went to the United States for training in countering maritime piracy.

== Missions ==
The missions of the BRI are :

- To apprehend groups of criminals engaged in serious acts of banditry...
- Release of hostages
- Surveillance and tailing in order to search and archive all information relating to banditry
- Maintaining order
- Anti-drugs and anti-weapon control
- Surveillance patrols
- The anti-gang

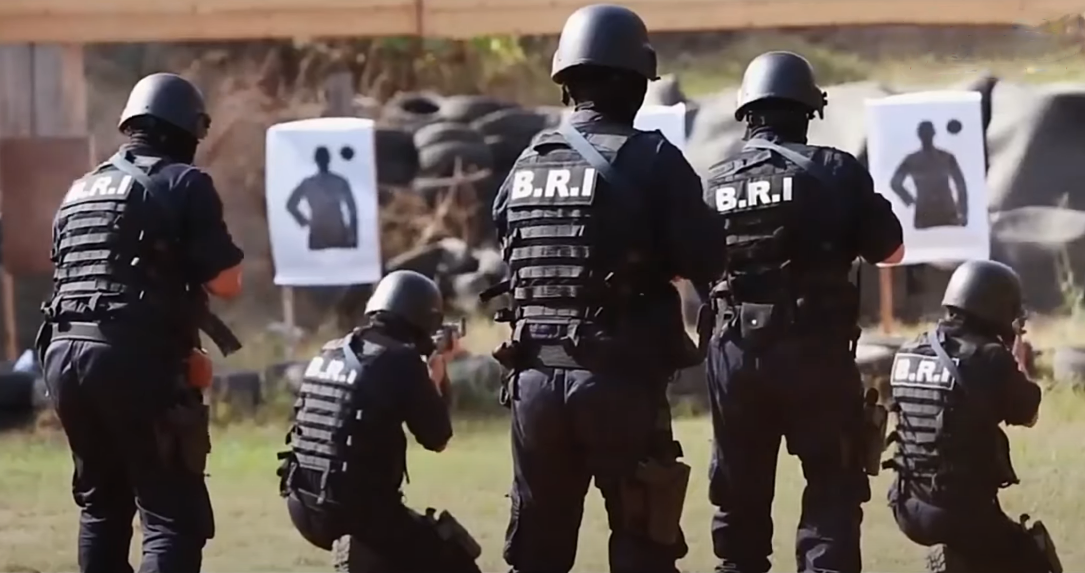
The BRI of Algiers during training at the shooting range.

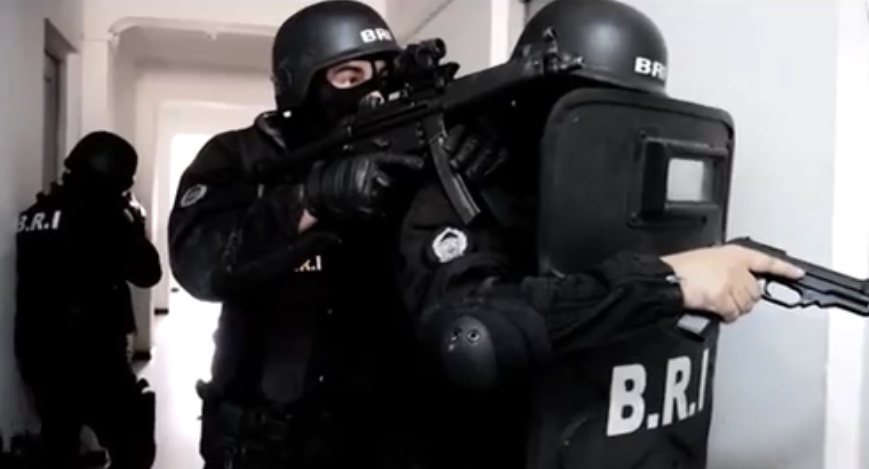
BRI Algiers during hostage rescue training.
