= Directorate of Security and Presidential Protection =

Algerian presidential guards

Directorate General of Security and Presidential Protection
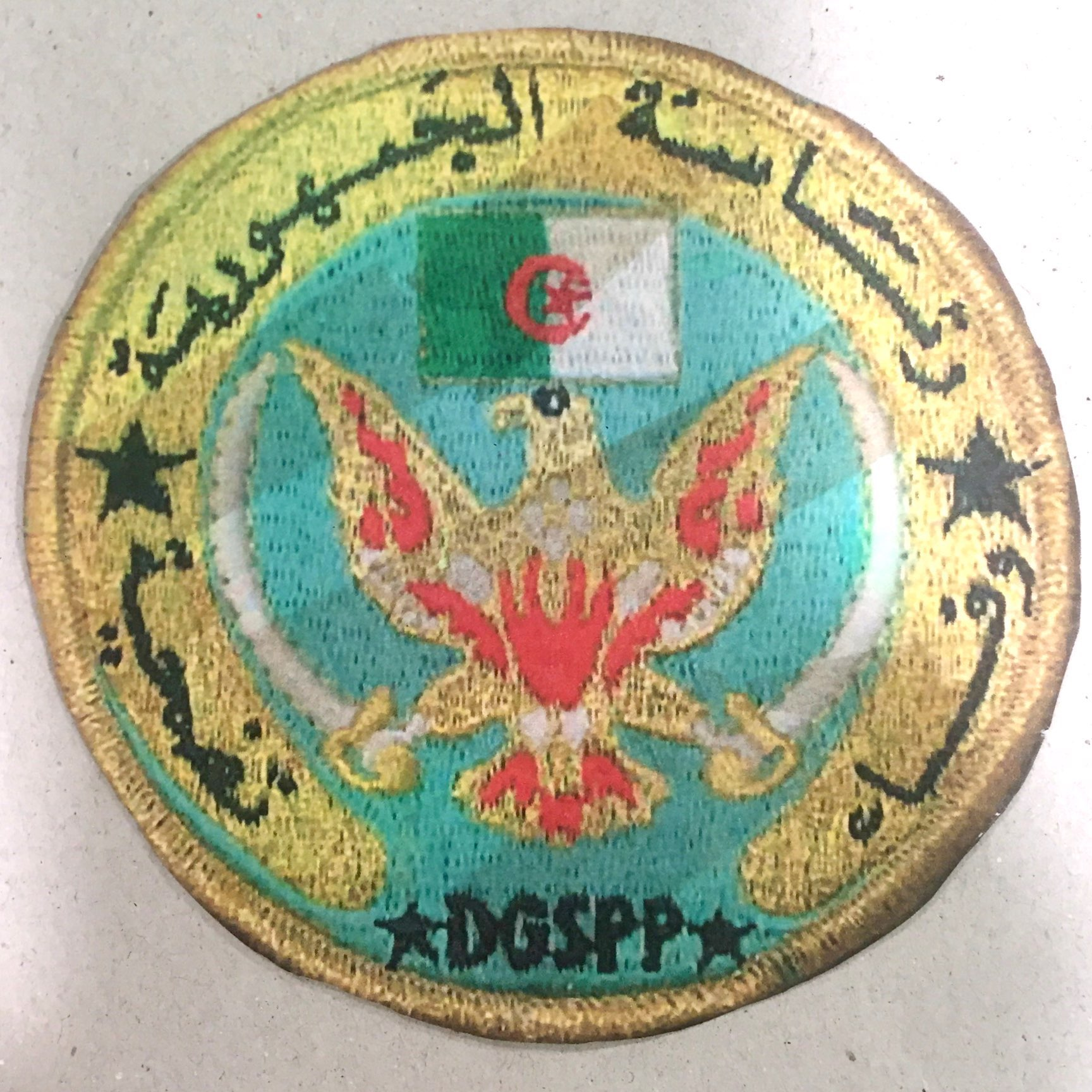
- Service branches: Republican Guard
- Headquarters: Algiers

Leadership
- Commander-in-Chief: General Belkacem Laribi

Personnel
- Active personnel: 60

The Directorate General of Security and Presidential Protection (DGSPP) is a close protection unit, administratively attached to the Algerian Republican Guard. It is responsible for the personal and immediate protection of the President of the Algerian Republic and his family.

== History ==
Historically, the Directorate General of Presidential Security and Protection (DGSPP) was a security service attached to the Department of Intelligence and Security (DRS).

In December 1994, four armed GIA terrorists masquerading as DGSPP agents boarded Air France Flight 8969 to hijack it.

Since 2015, the Directorate General of Security and Presidential Protection (DGSPP) has been attached to the Algerian Republican Guard by decision of the President of the Republic.

The DGSPP is made up of seasoned members of the Special Intervention Group (GIS), which is considered an elite response and protection unit.

== Mission ==
The DGSPP's mission is :

- To ensure the personal and immediate protection of the President of the Republic, his family, certain personalities (former presidents, certain presidential advisers, foreign personalities visiting Algeria) as well as their official residences. This last mission is shared with different entities.
- To implement all the measures necessary for the material organisation and security of the President of the Republic's travels.

== Organization ==
DGSPP has several units that each have their own specialties and can work as much together as alone.

DGSPP has :

- Traffic Unit (which takes care of predefining main and emergency routes, which takes care of urban traffic...)
- Close Protection Unit (which is placed in the centre of the system, escorts the President on foot and by car and intervenes directly in the event of an incident)
- Tactical Response Unit (emergency response to serious incidents, uniformed)
- Support Unit (which supports protection and intervention units, including snipers, plainclothes officers, and "back up" agents)
- Extraction Unit (which evacuates the President out of the area in the event of a serious incident)
- Protection and Surveillance Unit (which is responsible for the protection of El Mouradia Palace, as well as the President's personal residence, and all places where the President is present. They work jointly with the Guard and Protection Units of the Republican Guard and the police or gendarmerie).
- Reconnaissance units (are responsible for checking and securing areas where the president will be present both on the national territory and abroad, they work jointly with the Algerian police and gendarmerie and with local police units if they are abroad)
- Logistics Unit (responsible for providing the equipment as well as specialized equipment required for the mission)

== Equipment ==
The main weapons in staffing in the service are:

- Glock 17
- Smith & Wesson M&P
- SIG-Sauer P228
- Beretta 92

=== Machine pistols ===
- HK MP5
- HK MP7
- Beretta M12

=== Assault rifles ===
- AKMS
- HK G36
- ARX 160

=== Others ===
- Grenades (flash, deafening...)
- Smoke grenades
- Kevkar protective case
- Kevlar protective umbrella

=== Uniform ===
For close protection teams:

- Suit
- Communication headset
- Protective goggles
- Bullet-proof vest

For Tactical Response and Support Units:

- Black jumpsuit
- Rangers
- Hood
- Bullet-proof vest
- Tactical vest
- Plate carrier vest
- Rangers
- Gloves
- Elbow and knee pads
- Communication Headset

=== Vehicles ===
Among the vehicles used, some are equipped with a jamming system and others are armoured.

== Command ==
- Major General Djamel Kehal Medjdoub (2005-2015)
- General Nacer Habchi (2015-2020)
- General Belkacem Laribi (since 2020)
