= Special Intervention Group =

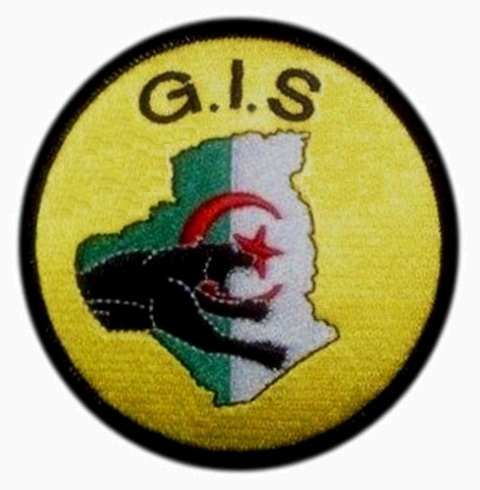
- Official GIS insigna
- Active: 1987–2016
- Country: Algeria
- Branch: Département du Renseignement et de la Sécurité
- Type: Special forces
- Size: ~400 operators
- Garrison/HQ: Algiers, Algeria 67
- Nickname: Ninjas
- Colors: Black
- Mascot: Black Panther
- Engagements: Air France Flight 8969 hijacking (1994); Sahara hostage crisis 2003; In Amenas hostage crisis (2013)

The Special Intervention Group (French: Groupe d'Intervention Spécial, GIS) is an Algerian special forces unit created in 1987, initially with 400 members.

== History ==
Since 1992, GIS forces have operated within the context of violent confrontation between the Algerian government and Islamic militants; major human rights violations against civilians have been alleged against both sides. A resulting arms embargo against Algeria initially prevented the GIS from obtaining equipment such as night-vision goggles typical for such units. However, after the September 11, 2001 attacks, western matériel vendors were allowed to sell equipment to Algeria in the name of the international war on terrorism.

== Responsibility and training ==
A sub-unit of the Département du Renseignement et de la Sécurité (DRS), it is responsible for black operation, capture or kill high-value targets, counterterrorism and hostage rescue crisis management, executive protection, and special warfare. It is based in Algiers and has a base at Blida, 50 km (31 miles) from Algiers. The Special Intervention Group (GIS) made several elaborate training courses in various domains (air assault, close-quarters battle, combat diving, commando style raids, counterterrorism and hostage rescue crisis management, defusing and disposal of bombs, field intelligence gathering, parachuting, reconnaissance, SERE, sniping, tactical driving, tactical medical emergency, and other things related to special warfare) to the Officers' training school of the special troops (EATS) in Algeria, without forgetting the training in the highly rated of the Alpha Group of Russia. The men of the GIS are trained in the Japanese martial arts Ju-Jitsu and the Korean martial arts Kuk Sool Won, but in a purely military aspect.

== Firearms ==
Assault rifle

- AKM
- Steyr AUG
- Heckler and Koch G36

Machine guns

- PKM machine gun

SMG

- Beretta M12
- Heckler & Koch MP5
- Heckler & Koch MP7

Sniper rifle

- Dragunov sniper rifle
- Remington 700

Shotguns

- Franchi SPAS-12

Pistols

- Glock 17
- Beretta 92
- Beretta 93R
- Browning Hi Power
- Caracal pistol
