= Special Intervention Detachment =

Police tactical unit

- Détachement spécial d'intervention (French) المفرزة الخاصة للتدخل (Arabic)
- Active: 1989 - present
- Country: Algeria
- Agency: Gendarmerie Nationale
- Type: Police tactical unit
- Operations jurisdiction: Algiers Province
- Abbreviation: DSI (French)

Commanders
- Current commander: Colonel Abdallah Djebari

The Special Intervention Detachment (French: Détachement Spécial d'Intervention, DSI, Arabic: المفرزة الخاصة للتدخل) is a police tactical unit of the Algerian Gendarmerie Nationale.

== History ==
The DSI was created on August 27, 1989, by a presidential decree. It is elite unit of the Algerian gendarmerie. and the Algerian equivalent of the French GIGN.

It was established to confront the increase in crimes and criminals, especially in its mode of action, as it offers adapted intervention possibilities and additional tactical capacities.

== Training ==
=== Recruitment ===
The DSI recruits its future operators directly within the superior schools of the national gendarmerie for officers (the latter are selected before their graduation) and at the level of the schools of non-commissioned officers of the national gendarmerie of Sétif and Sidi Bel Abbès for non-commissioned officers.[4]

=== Induction training ===
The students wishing to join the unit are first evaluated, if they pass this evaluation phase, they will be admitted to the integration program which has 4 phases:[4]

- The physical preparation program: (Military training, instruction in combat sports such as karate, boxing, unarmed combat, armed combat, martial arts in general). They are supervised by professional instructors from the combat sports unit.
- The blocked training course of preparation: (Physical, psychological, and combat training) this phase is one of the most difficult because the trainee is put to hard test (day and night exercise, unfavorable climatic conditions) and it ends with the famous psychological obstacle course.
- The qualification parachute jump: They go through the School of commando training and initiation to parachuting (EFCIP) of Boghar in order to pass their parachutist license, but also to be initiated to commando techniques and parachuting.
- The special intervention professional patent (BPSI): This is the final training to be operational within the unit, the trainees will receive courses in diving, combat first aid, training for dog handlers, but also shooting, use of explosives, close protection, and techniques of climbing buildings and reliefs, intervention in closed environment (Close Quarter Battle), open, etc.), are on the menu of these daily sessions. The training is carried out in 2 stages, the first is the phase of pedagogical instruction, and the second is the phase of restitution and evaluation of the trainees, they must pass the final test if they want to integrate the unit.

If they pass this test, they will be given the DSI pin and patch and will be admitted to the operational unit and become full-fledged operators of the unit.

The duration of training in DSI is 6 months, and trainees receive the equivalent of 1400 hours of advanced training.

=== Continuous training ===
Nevertheless, the operators are in almost permanent training and each member follows a daily training. Shooting training is daily, with each element able to go to the shooting range whenever they wish.

Shooting tests including timed, selective shooting, accuracy, long range, are evaluated by the training cell instructors.

The training operations of different scenarios, always with live ammunition, are reviewed and debriefed to correct each action and try to improve its technicality.

also often train at night under night vision binoculars on all types of situations in the 13 sites reserved for them. exercises from a helicopter with recall techniques but also on fast driving and basic techniques in the field of negotiations and hostage taking.

DSI has trained a number of elite promotions from African countries in intervention and close protection.[4][5]

They exchanged with several foreign counterparts, among them the Austrian unit EKO COBRA, the Jordanian Special Operation Forces and the Jordanian Gendarmerie and the French GIGN. The DSI has provided many promotions from African countries; training in intervention and close protection.

The DSI has provided training in intervention and close protection to a number of elite promotions from African countries.

== Missions ==
The main tasks of the DSI are :

- The counterterrorism and the hostage rescue
- The neutralization of criminals or terrorists in various places (urban, forest, desert, mountain...)
- The participation of judiciary police operations
- The escort and transfer of dangerous individuals
- Close protection and escort of VIP's

== Organization ==
The DSI is subdivided into several units, each with its own function, depending on the mission, they can work together in one operation or separately on their own.

The DSI is composed of :

- Intervention units: composed of assault groups, support groups, marksmans
- Operational support units: reconnaissance, observation, listening, jamming
- Combat swimmer units: amphibious assault, sabotage, reconnaissance, rescue, search
- Close protection and escort units: protection, security, VIP escort
- Artificer and deminer units : demining, break-in, technical assistance
- Cynophilia units: composed of cynotechnical groups, dog recruitment and training groups, drug or explosive search groups.
- Training unit: composed of a training and instruction cell, a sports office and a combat sports cell

== Main tasks ==
The DSI has carried out hundreds of operations since its creation, from the release of hostages to the arrest of forcible persons ("neutralization" in the unit's jargon). Some of the most well-known operations include the following:

Massive hostage crisis in In Amenas (Tiguentourine): On January 16, 2013, a column of four all-terrain vehicles, transporting about 30 heavily armed terrorists, crossed the Algerian-Libyan border, seized the gas complex of Tiguentourine, located 40 km from In Amenas, and took the 800 workers, including 130 foreigners, hostage. The special forces carried out the assault, which resulted in the elimination of 27 members of the terrorist commando, the arrest of three others and the death of 37 hostages.

== Equipment ==
The DSI, like all special forces in the world, has specific equipment for each intervention (helmets, tactical vests, bulletproof vests). The DSI operators are equipped with the latest generation of modern equipment.

| Model | Origin | Type |
|---|---|---|
| Glock 17 | Austria | Semi-automatic pistol |
| Beretta 92 | Italy | Semi-automatic pistol |
| Smith & Wesson Sigma | United States | Semi-automatic pistol |
| Caracal | UAE | Semi-automatic pistol |
| Heckler & Koch MP5 | Germany | Sub-machine gun |
| Heckler & Koch MP7 | Germany | Sub-machine gun |
| Beretta PM 12S | Italy | Sub-machine gun |
| Franchi SPAS 12 | Italy | Shotgun |
| Beretta RS202M2 | Italy | Shotgun |
| AKM | Soviet Union | Assault rifle |
| AKMS | Soviet Union | Assault rifle |
| AR-M4SF | Bulgaria | Assault rifle |
| Steyr AUG | Austria | Assault rifle |
| Heckler & Koch G36 | Germany | Assault rifle |
| Sako TRG 22 | Finland | Sniper rifle |
| Accuracy International AWP | United Kingdom | Sniper rifle |
| SVD Dragunov | Soviet Union | Sniper rifle |
| Remington MSR | United States | Sniper rifle |
| Zastava M93 Black Arrow | Serbia | Sniper rifle |
| PKM | Soviet Union | Machine gun |
| RPK | Soviet Union | Machine gun |
| RPG-7 | Soviet Union | Grenade launcher |

=== Individual gear ===
- Fast ops core hemlet, helmet with bulletproof visor
- Green Tactical combination, Ghillie suit (Support Sections and Snipers)
- Bullet-proof vest
- Ciras Vest
- Plate carrier vest
- Tactical vest
- Communication headset
- Kevlar gloves
- Night vision googles
- Balaclava
- Knee and elbow pads
- Holster
- Protective goggles
- X26 Taser
- Crossbow

== Vehicles ==
=== Terrestrial ===
- Ford F-150 All Terrain Vehicle with Mobile Adjustable Ramp System (MARS)
- Gendarmerie Nissan Patrol All Terrain Vehicle
- Gendarmerie Toyota Land Cruiser All Terrain Vehicle
- Toyota Land cruiser civil armoured
- Nissan Patrol civil armoured
- Unmarked vehicles

=== Aerial ===
- AS355N écureuil Helicopter of the National Gendarmerie
- Agusta-Westland AW-109 LUH Helicopter of the National Gendarmerie
- Mil Mi-17 Helicopter of the Algerian Air Force
- Aircraft of the Algerian Air Force

== Pictures ==
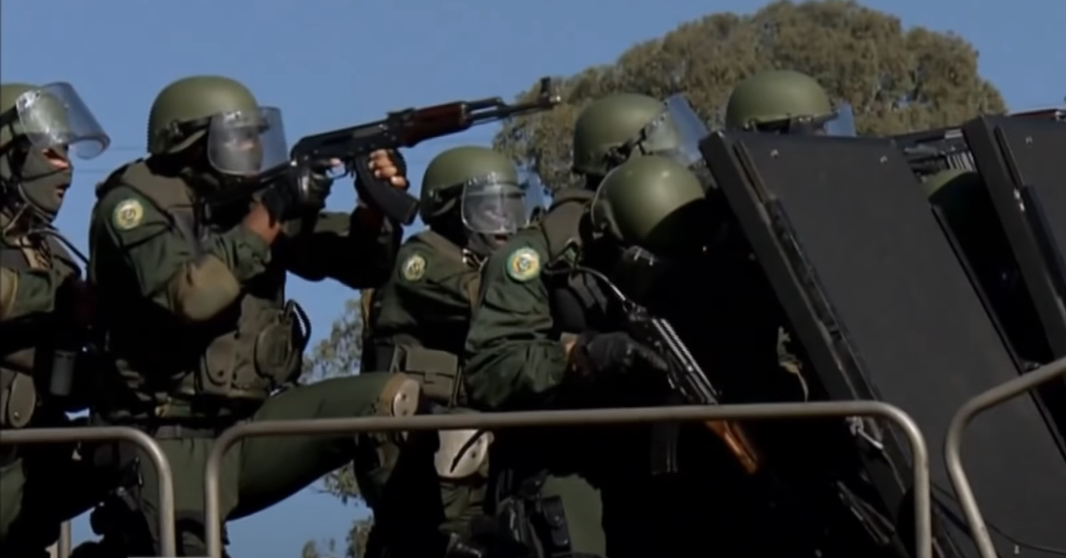
DSI intervention group during a training.

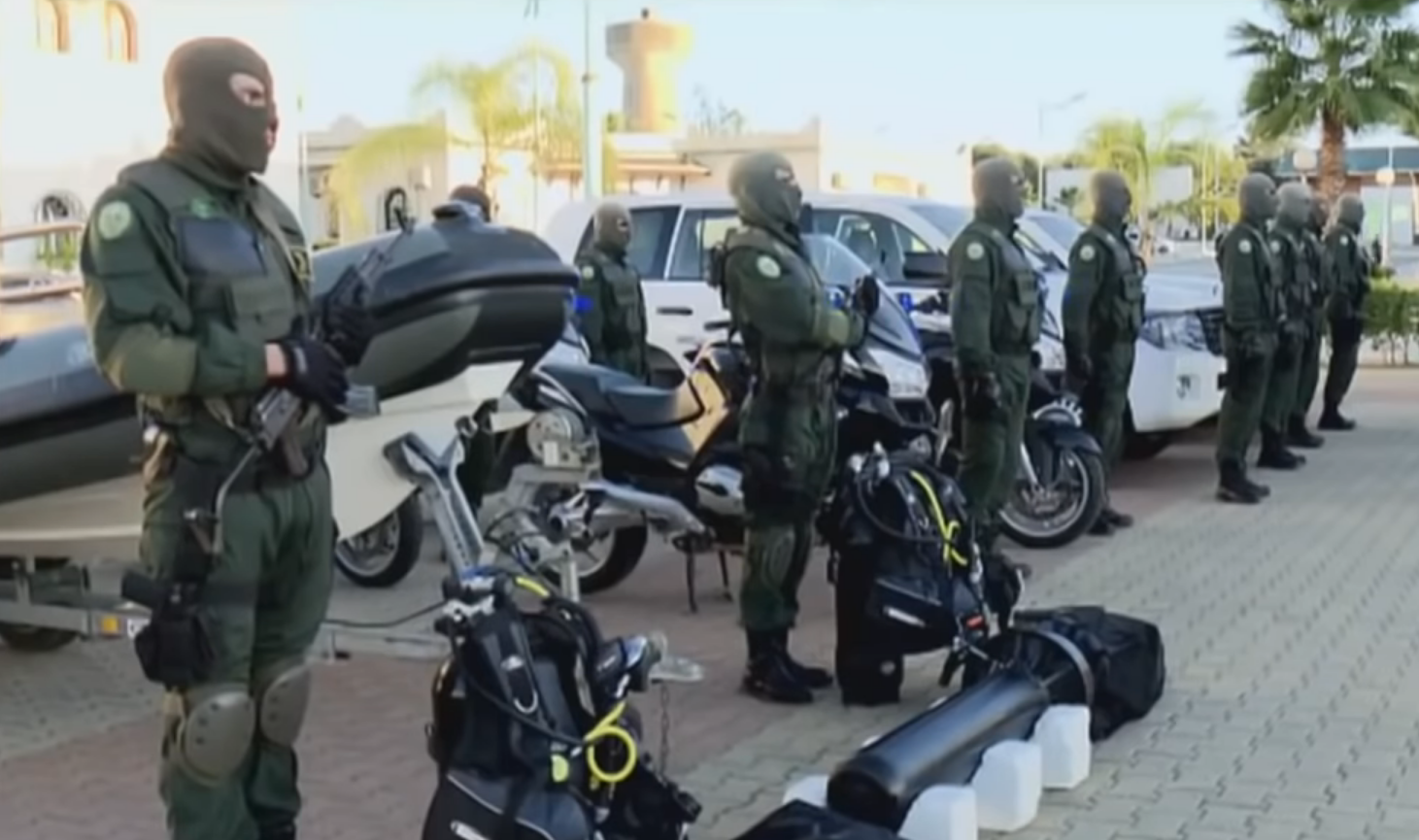
DSI divers group.
