= Boghar =

Boghar بوغار
- Commune and town
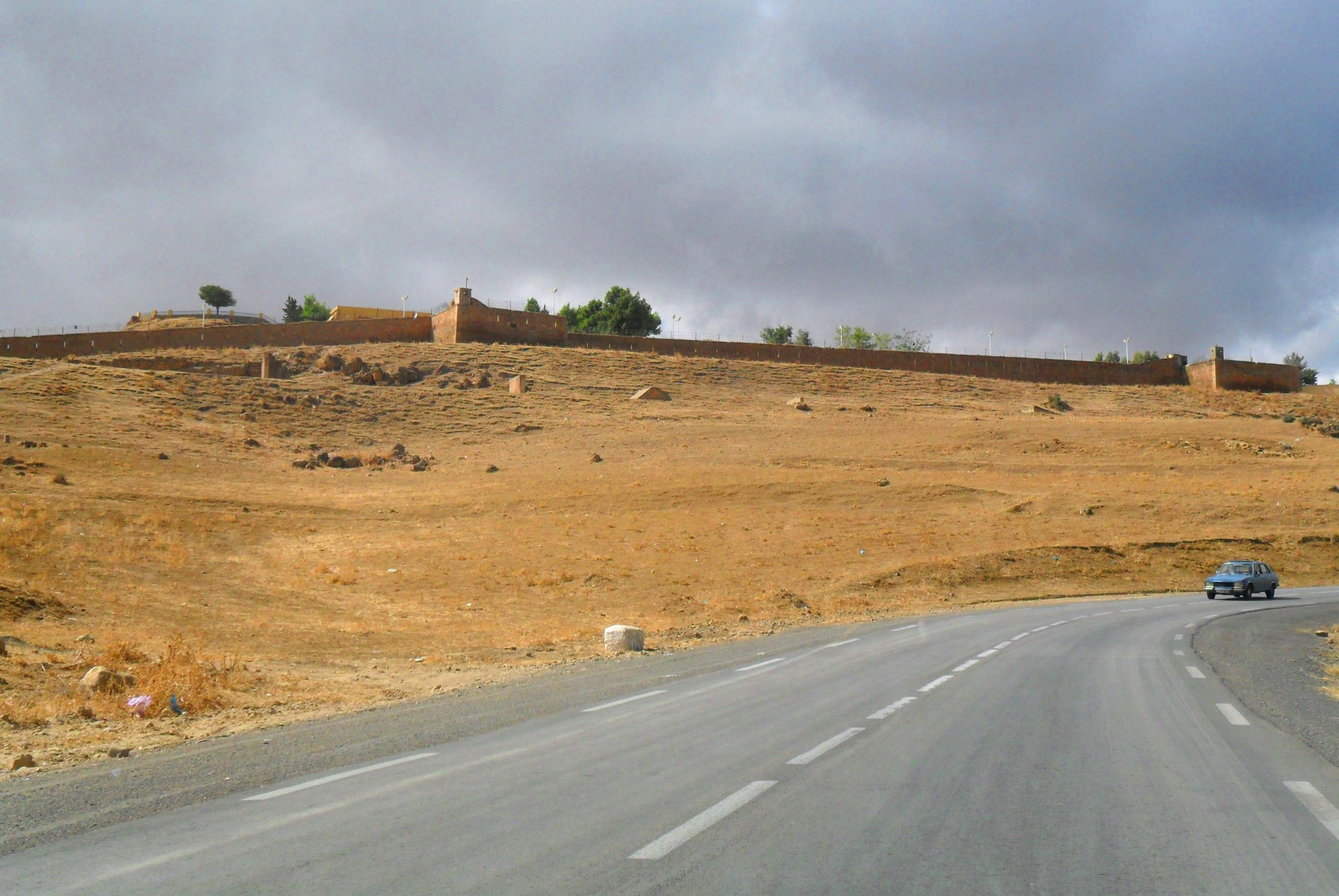
- Nickname: Voncaria

- Location within Algeria
- Coordinates: 35°54′41″N 2°43′0″E
- Departement: Algeria
- Province: Médéa Province
- District: Ouled Antar

Area
  - Total: 4,747 sq mi (12,295 km^{2})
- Elevation: 3,123 ft (952 m)

Population (2008)
  - Total: 5,972
  - Density: 130/sq mi (49/km^{2})
- Time zone: UTC+1 (CET)

Boghar is a town and commune in Médéa Province, Algeria.

== History ==
During the Roman Empire the town was the site of a Roman town called Voncaria. At the 411 Carthage conference, between Catholic and Donatist bishops, the town was represented by the Donatist Felix, declaring that he did not have a Catholic competitor in his diocese. Then at the synod convened in Carthage in 484 by the Arian ruler Huneric of the Vandal Kingdom, the bishop Donatus Voncariensis represented the town.

The modern town was begun in July 1839 by Abd el-Kader. In October of the same year, the foundations of a fortification of a fort were seen, which was completed the following year. The town was burnt down in 1841 by General Baraguay-d'Hilliers, and then rebuilt by the French.

== Politics ==
The current mayor is Hazedj Abdelkader.
