= Zastava M93 Black Arrow =

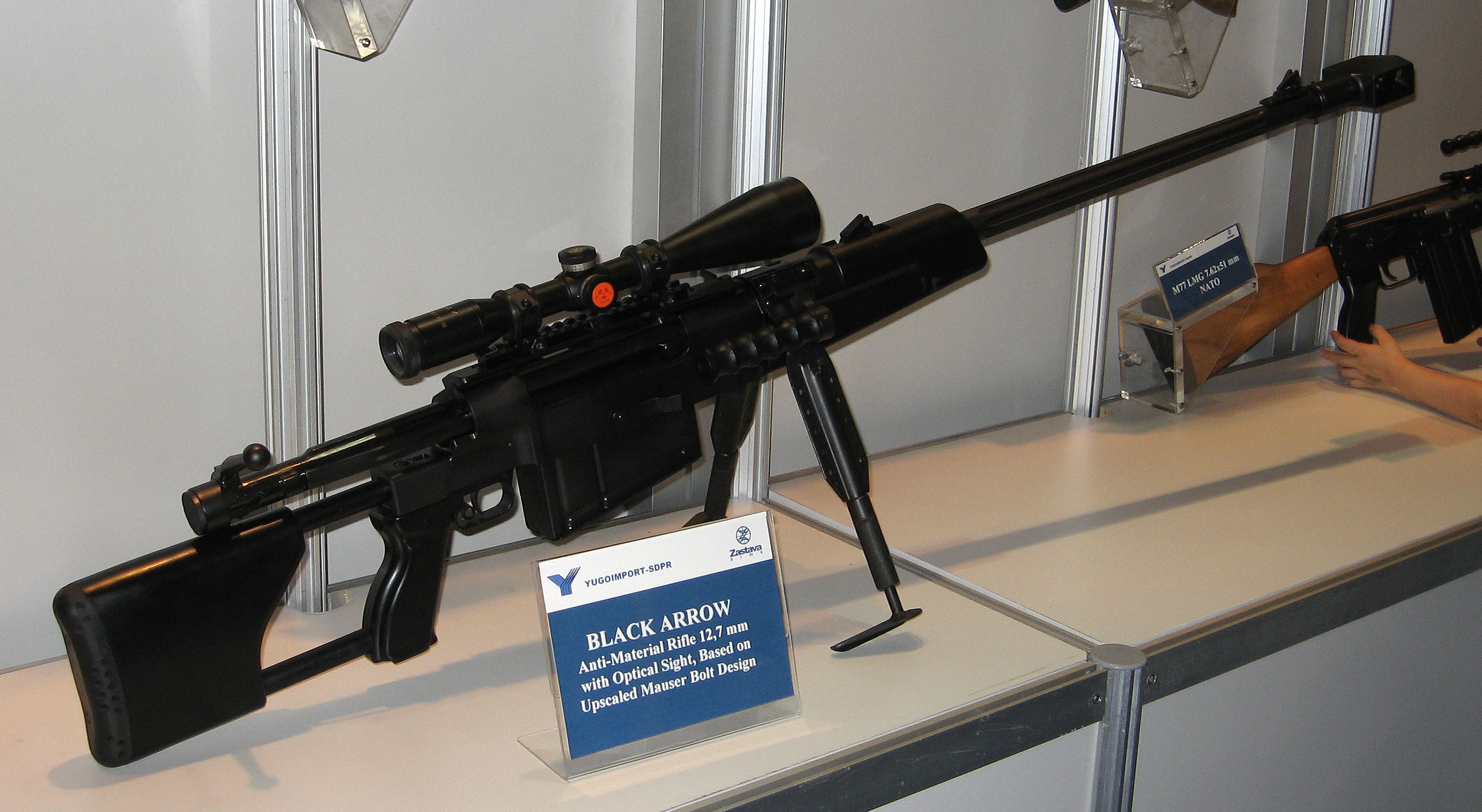
- Type: Anti-material rifle
- Place of origin: Federal Republic of Yugoslavia; Serbia and Montenegro; Serbia

Service history
- In service: 1998–present
- Used by: See Users
- Wars: Second Liberian Civil War; Syrian Civil War; Libyan Civil War (2014–present); War in Iraq (2013–2017); Yemeni Civil War (2014–present); Saudi Arabian-led intervention in Yemen; 2020 Nagorno-Karabakh war

Production history
- Designed: 1993
- Manufacturer: Zastava Arms
- Produced: 1998–present

Specifications
- Mass: 16 kg (35 lb)
- Length: 1,670 mm (66 in)
- Barrel length: 1,000 mm (39 in)
- Caliber: 12.7×108mm; .50 BMG (12.7x99mm)
- Action: Bolt action (rotating bolt; long action)
- Muzzle velocity: 12.7x108mm: 800 m/s (2,600 ft/s); .50 BMG: 888 m/s (2,910 ft/s)
- Effective firing range: 1,800 m (5,900 ft)
- Feed system: 5- or 10-round box magazine
- Sights: Optical sight (8×32)

The M93 Black Arrow (Serbian: М93 Црна стрела, M93 Crna strela) is a Serbian bolt-action 12.7×108mm anti-materiel rifle, designed and manufactured by Zastava Arms.

== History ==
The rifle was designed in 1993 and entered production in 1998. In Serbian military service, it was issued with a ZRAK 8x56 optical sight (8x magnified 56mm scope with markings up to 1,800 m (2,000 yd)), which was essentially a scaled-up version of the scope issued with the smaller Zastava M76.

== Design and features ==
The Zastava M93 Black Arrow rifle is available in both 12.7×108mm and .50 BMG. It is a bolt-action, air-cooled, magazine-fed firearm with a fixed stock. The weapon is fed through a 5- or 10-round detachable, spring-loaded box magazine. The shoulder stock has a telescoping design, with two stiff springs connecting the stock to the pistol grip. The bolt handle rests over the right side of the receiver. A carrying handle is affixed to the forend and the barrel is capped by a multi-baffled brake to assist in handling the massive recoil action. A folding bipod is also attached.

Its overall design is a scale-up of the Mauser 98 system, similarly to the Mauser 1918 T-Gewehr, with some influence from the French FR-F1. The FR-F1 was developed primarily from the MAS-36, which itself was influenced by the Mauser; thus, the Black Arrow derives the majority of its features from the Mauser design and its French iterations. The front end of the M93's bolt closely resembles the Mauser design, while the back end and firing pin are essentially the same design as the FR-F1's bolt, scaled up to 12.7mm caliber. This simplifies the manufacturing and disassembly process, while retaining the famed reliability of the original Mauser design. The M93 has a trigger block safety design similar to the Russian SVT-40 semi-automatic rifle; the same design is used by the FR-F1.

Versions sold on the civilian market, particularly in the United States, have a Picatinny rail over the receiver instead of an included scope, allowing purchasers of the rifle to mount the optic of their choosing. Originally chambered in the Soviet/Eastern Bloc 12.7x108mm cartridge, an optional chambering in the American .50 BMG (12.7x99mm) heavy machine gun round was later developed for the export market, as 12.7x108mm is rare outside of former Soviet nations.

== Users ==
=== Current ===
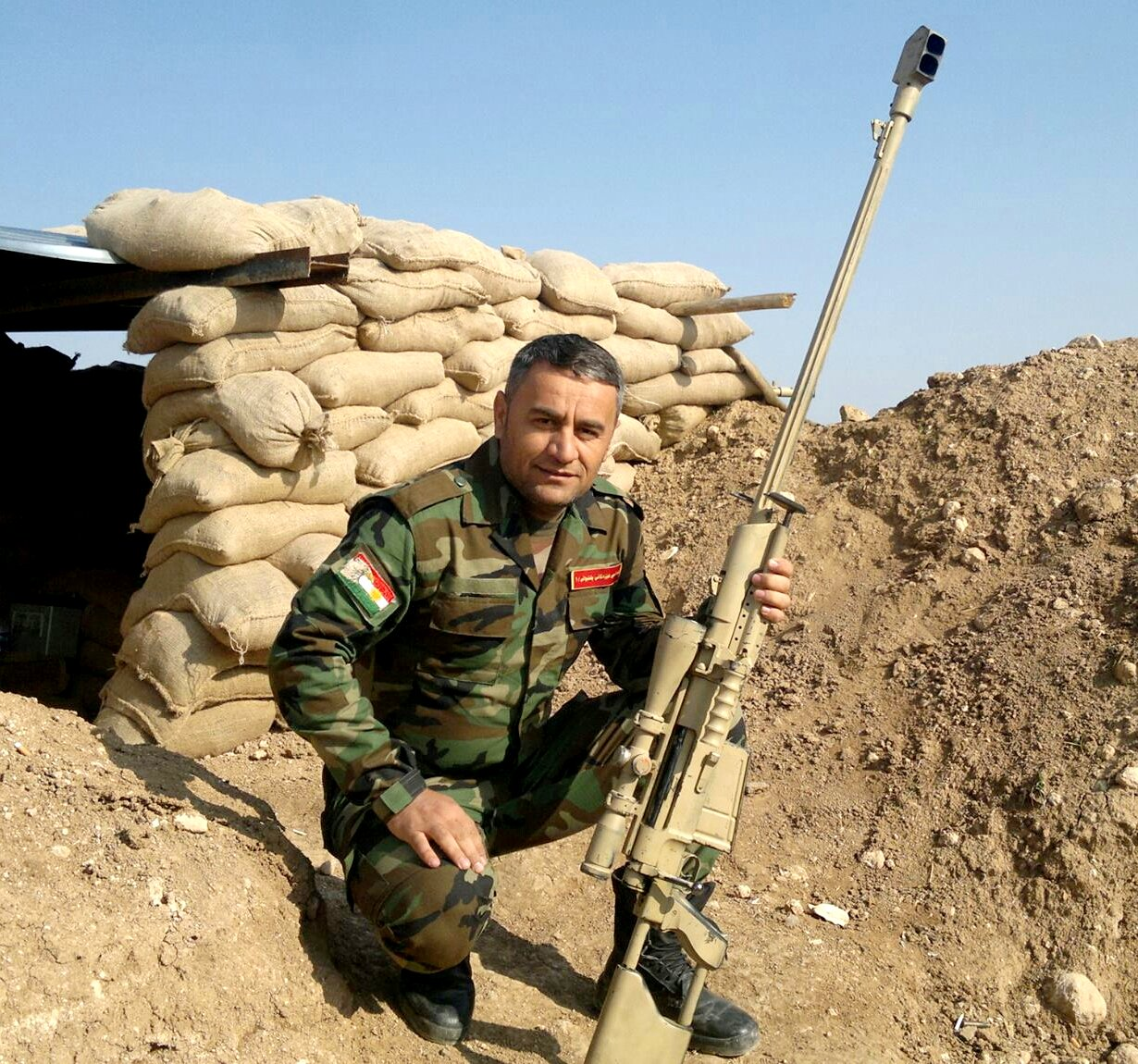
Peshmerga with M93

- Algeria − Bulgarian re-export
- Armenia − 250 imported from Serbia in 2007
- Indonesia
- Ivory Coast − Bulgarian re-export
- Jordan
- Liberia
- Libya
- North Macedonia
- Philippines − 37 M93s to the Philippine Army, 11 to the Philippine Navy and Philippine Marine Corps, and one to the Philippine Air Force and the Intelligence Service of the AFP (ISAFP).
- Serbia
- Sri Lanka
- Syria − Used by the Syrian Army.
- Yemen − Used by the internationally recognized government and Houthi forces in the Yemeni civil war

=== Non-state actors ===
- YPG

== Sources ==
- "Снајперска пушка М93" [M93 sniper rifle]. Serbian Army (in Serbian).
- Jane's International Defense Review: IDR. Vol. 34. Jane's Information Group. 2001. "M93 Black Arrow"
