= Caracal pistol =

Series of semi-automatic pistols

Caracal F
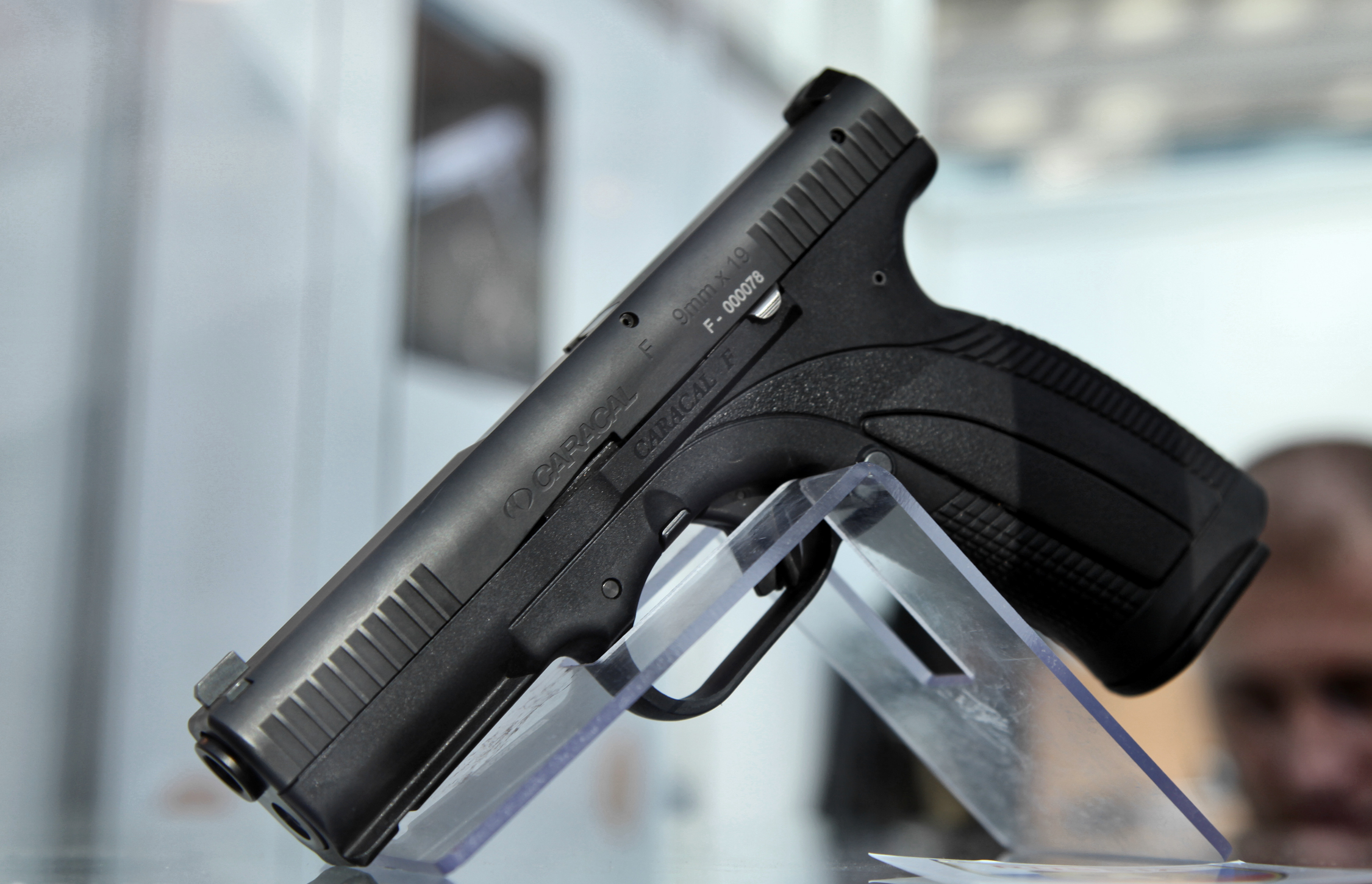
- Caracal F pistol
- Type: Semi-automatic pistol
- Place of origin: United Arab Emirates

Service history
- In service: 2007–present
- Used by: See Users

Production history
- Designer: Wilhelm Bubits
- Designed: 2005
- Manufacturer: Caracal International LLC
- Produced: 2006–Present
- Variants: Variants

Specifications
- Mass: 790 g (28 oz) Caracal Enhanced F 750 g (26 oz) Caracal F 700 g (25 oz) Caracal C 650 g (23 oz) Caracal SC
- Length: 178 mm (7.0 in) Caracal F 167 mm (6.6 in) Caracal C 160 mm (6.3 in) Caracal SC
- Barrel length: 104 mm (4.1 in) Caracal F 90 mm (3.5 in) Caracal C 86 mm (3.4 in) Caracal SC
- Width: 28 mm (1.1 in) Caracal F and C 23.5 mm (0.9 in) Caracal SC
- Height: 135 mm (5.3 in) Caracal F 122 mm (4.8 in) Caracal C 112 mm (4.4 in) Caracal SC
- Cartridge: 9×19mm Parabellum; 9×21mm.357 SIG.40 S&W
- Action: Short recoil, locked breech
- Feed system: 18-round box magazine (9×19mm Parabellum, 9×21mm Caracal F); 16-round box magazine (.357 SIG, .40 S&W Caracal F); 15-round box magazine (9×19mm Parabellum, 9×21mm Caracal C); 13-round box magazine (.357 SIG, .40 S&W Caracal C); 13-round box magazine (9×19mm Parabellum, 9×21mm Caracal SC)
- Sights: Fixed iron sights

The Caracal pistol is a series of semi-automatic pistols manufactured by Caracal International LLC a subsidiary of Tawazun Holding from the United Arab Emirates.

== Development ==
In 2002, Austrian firearms designer Wilhelm Bubits who previously had designed the Steyr M pistol, began working with weapons experts from the United Arab Emirates, to develop a range of modern pistols and accessories. The collaboration led to the development of the Caracal pistol.

== Issues ==
Due to issues with heat treatment of slides and improper quality control, the pistols had a tendency for catastrophic failures. Thus in October 2013 the original Caracal pistol line had to be delisted by the manufacturer.

=== Recall ===
On Sept. 9th, 2013 a recall was issued for all model C pistols made by Caracal stating:

Caracal is now issuing this recall of all Model C pistols in all markets, following the completion of a full investigation. Caracal is initiating this voluntary recall of Model C pistols because the safety of its customers is paramount.

This recall affects all Model C pistols, including but not limited to those with serial numbers which start with the following letters: HM, AA, AD, AG, CA, CB, CC, CD, CE, CF, CG, CH, CI, CJ, CK, CL, CM, CN, CP, CR and CS.

If you own or have access to a Caracal Model C pistol, PLEASE DO NOT LOAD OR FIRE YOUR PISTOL. Please contact Caracal customer care immediately to arrange to have your Model C pistol returned. Caracal will provide you with a full refund of the purchase price of your Caracal Model C pistol or vouchers for other Caracal products. Unfortunately, the potential safety issues cannot be addressed through a repair of the Model C pistol and all Model C pistols must be returned for refund.

In October 2016 Caracal USA announced that they will replace the recalled pistols with a Model F pistol upgraded with a redesigned trigger safety, trigger bar, firing pin unit.

== Adoption ==
The Caracal pistol series are the first pistols made in the United Arab Emirates and is the service pistol used by the United Arab Emirates Armed Forces.

In February 2007 25,000 Caracal F pistols in 9 mm were ordered by various armies and security forces of the Gulf Cooperation Council countries.

The Caracal pistol is now the new service pistol of the United Arab Emirates, Bahrain and Jordan as of April, 2008.

The United Arab Emirates and Algeria established on November, 17th, 2008 a joint committee in order to test the Caracal pistol for further adoption by Algeria.

== Users ==
- Algeria
- Jordan
  - Jordanian Armed Forces
  - Jordanian police units
- Libya
  - Libyan National Army
- United Arab Emirates
  - United Arab Emirates Armed Forces
  - Abu Dhabi Police Force
  - Dubai Police Force

== See also ==
- CAR 816
