= Commando Training and Parachuting Initiation School =

- Founded: 1963
- Headquarters: Boghar

Personnel
- Active personnel: 150

The commando training and parachuting initiation school (EFCIP), which is also known as the "commando training centre", is a specialized school belonging to the land forces of the Algerian army based in Boghar in the wilaya of Medea in Algeria.

== History ==
The history of EFCIP began in Roman times, when the Romans had their cantonment in Boghar and created a fort there, the "castellum mauritanum" (mother unit of the school).

The Emir Abdelkader later used it for himself and his army, the same barracks would later bear his name (barracks of the Emir) until it was burnt down in 1841.

Following the arrival of the French colonial army in the region, they used the site of the Emir's barracks as a military barracks because its location was strategic and therefore interesting to house colonial troops, they later built a military hospital there and the town also housed French settlers.

After independence in 1962, the school enjoyed an African reputation because it contributed to the training and instruction of foreign military personnel coming from several African countries, and it was afterwards renamed "Boghar Training Centre".

On November 10, 1993, the school, which had been called the "Combat Arms Training Centre", was renamed the "Commandos Training Centre ".

It is now one of the specialised training establishments of the Algerian Land Forces, along with the special troops superior school (ESTS) and the special troops training center (CFTS) in Biskra.

In addition, the 104th Operational Maneuvers Regiment (104th RMO), a regiment belonging to the Algerian Special Forces, is also located near this school in Boghar.

At the entrance to the school, one can also see the school's slogan, which is: "Algeria will never wear the mourning habit as long as special forces exist ".

== Training ==
=== Program ===
The school's training is essentially based around:

- Field exercises
- Assault, counter-ambush, and close-quarters combat techniques.
- In combat (urban, mountain)
- To the anti-guerrilla war
- Shooting
- At the truck jump
- Survival in hostile areas with difficult conditions
- Overcoming obstacles
- On a psychological, risk, aquatic, mountainous journey...
- Martial arts (kuk-sool, karate, judo, boxing...)

The training of the commando students is 6 months. During these months there is intensive training meant to be mentally and psychologically challenging. If they complete the training they will be given the title of commando.

It trains all the parachute commandos of the Algerian army as well as the commandos of other army units coming from the infantry, but also some gendarmes, and especially all the members of the Algerian special forces.

Indeed, all Algerian special forces operators are also trained at the commandos' training centre as well as at the ESTS in Biskra.

It therefore trains all the commandos of the Algerian Army, as well as all the operators of the Algerian special forces, but also some gendarmes, police officers from elements of the Republican Guard... from specialised units and foreign military personnel. [1] [archive].

In addition, most Algerian special forces regiments regularly come to train or intern at this school.

This school therefore trains the elite of the Algerian army and also works closely with the Special Troops Superior School (ESTS) and the Special Troops Training Center (CFTS) in Biskra.

=== Types of training courses ===
Within EFCIP, there are therefore several types of training :

- Commando group leader
- Grenadier Voltigeur commando
- Commando 1st degree
- Special Forces Operator
- Healing
- Survival
- Recycling in the fight against terrorism

These types of training are intended for the rank and file (HDR) category of para-commando or commando specialty.

Upon successful completion of the course, the trainee will be awarded the maghawir (commando) diploma and the commando badge.

== Training resources and materials ==
The school has many means for the training of future commandos such as:

- Risk courses
- A journey of the fighter
- Obstacle courses
- Psychological journeys
- Truck jumping grounds
- Fields adapted to combat practice sessions
- Square miles of land for topography, survival...
- Shooting simulators
- Shooting ranges
- Sports fields and halls
- Several types of buildings with several different types of architecture for training in urban warfare
- Transport vehicles
- Dummy airplanes and helicopters (for parachuting and assault training)
