= 3rd Military Region =

3rd Military Region may refer to:

- 3rd Military Region (Algeria)
- 3rd Military Region (People's Army of Vietnam)
- 3rd Military Region (Yemen)
