= 2nd Military Region =

2nd Military Region may refer to:

- 2nd Military Region (Algeria)
- 2nd Military Region (People's Army of Vietnam)
- 2nd Military Region (Yemen)
