= Teledyne FLIR Black Hornet =

Military micro unmanned aerial vehicle

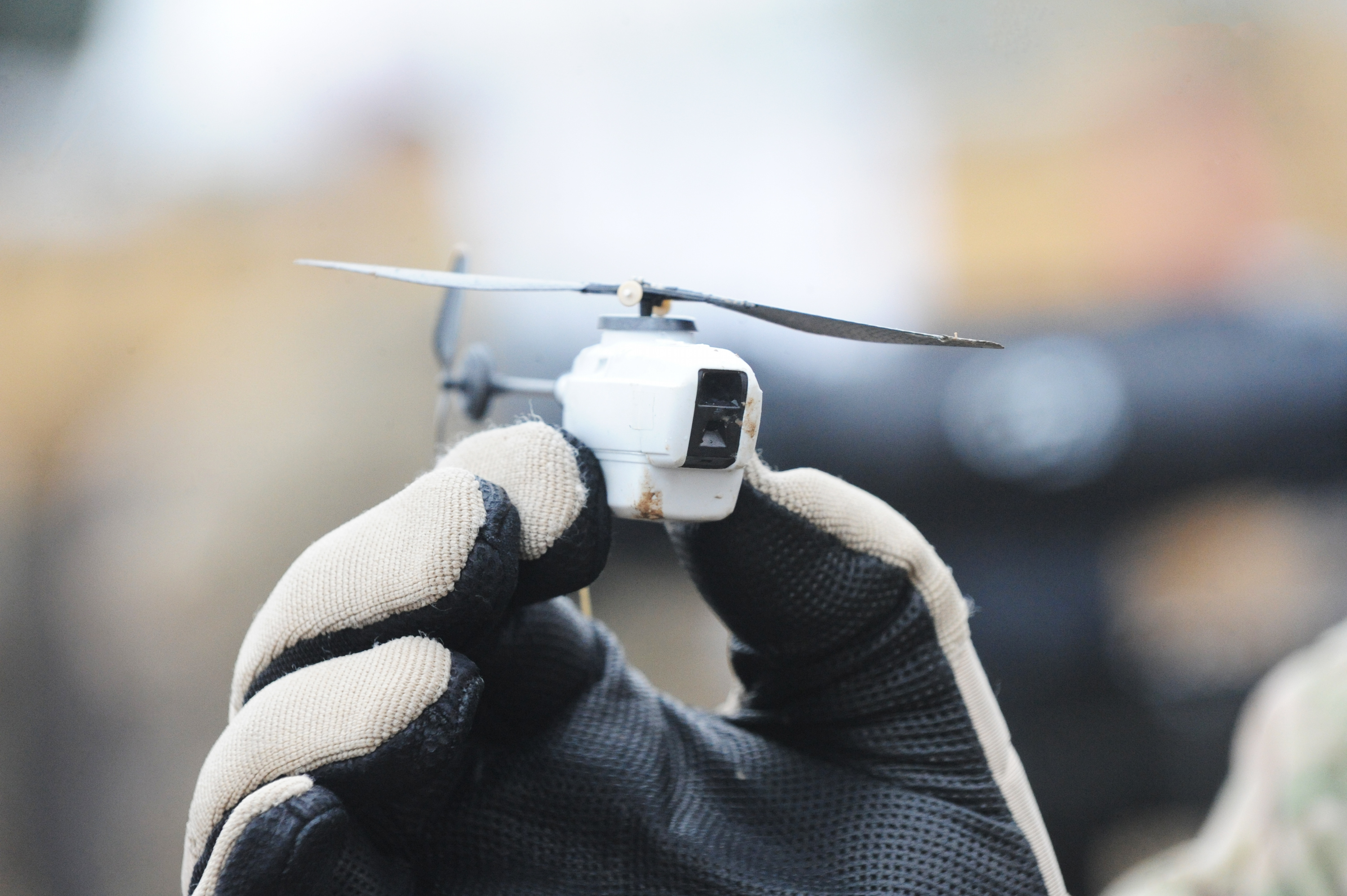
A Black Hornet helicopter unmanned aerial vehicle (UAV) (2013)

The Black Hornet is a military micro unmanned aerial vehicle (UAV) developed by Prox Dynamics AS of Norway, which was bought by Teledyne FLIR in 2016 for 134 million dollars. currently manufacturers the Black Hornet. Teledyne FLIR specializes in the manufacture of IR cameras, like the one used on the Black Hornet.

== Design ==
The Black Hornet is connected to the operator with a digital data link and GPS. Images are displayed on a small handheld terminal, which can be used by the operator to control the UAV.

The Black Hornet is launched from a small box that can be strapped to a utility belt, which also stores transmitted data.

Since the drone itself does not store any data, it is not an advantage if captured. Operators can steer the UAV or set waypoints for it to fly itself.

The drone measures around 16 × 2.5 cm (6 × 1 in) and provides troops on the ground with local situational awareness. It is small enough to fit in one hand and weighs 18 g (0.7 oz) with its battery.

The UAV is equipped with a camera which transmits video and still images to the operator. It was developed as part of a £20 million contract for 160 units with Marlborough Communications Ltd.

An operator can be trained to operate the Black Hornet in 20 minutes. It has three cameras: one looking forward, one straight down, and one pointing down at 45 degrees.

A Black Hornet package contains two helicopters and, since a 90% charge is reached in 20–25 minutes, the same as its hovering time, when one needs to be recharged the other is ready to fly. Top speed is 21 km/h (13 mph).

In October 2014, Prox Dynamics unveiled a version of the PD-100 Black Hornet with night vision capabilities, with long-wave infrared and day video sensors that can transmit video or high-resolution still images via a digital data link with a 1.6 km (1 mile) range.

Over 3,000 Black Hornets had been delivered as of 2014.

== Variants ==
=== Black Recon ===
The larger Black Recon model was revealed in 2023 after five years of development.

Based on the Black Hornet, it is designed to be launched from armored vehicles to give crews better situational awareness.

The Black Recon Vehicle Reconnaissance System (VRS) is an 80 kg (180 lb) box bolted onto the chassis of a ground vehicle that contains three UAVs.

They can be launched and controlled entirely from the safety of the vehicle's interior and are recovered autonomously. Each Black Recon weighs 350 g (12 oz) and can travel 6 km (3.7 mi) from its launch vehicle with an endurance of 45 minutes.

Deliveries are expected to begin in 2025.

== Operational history ==
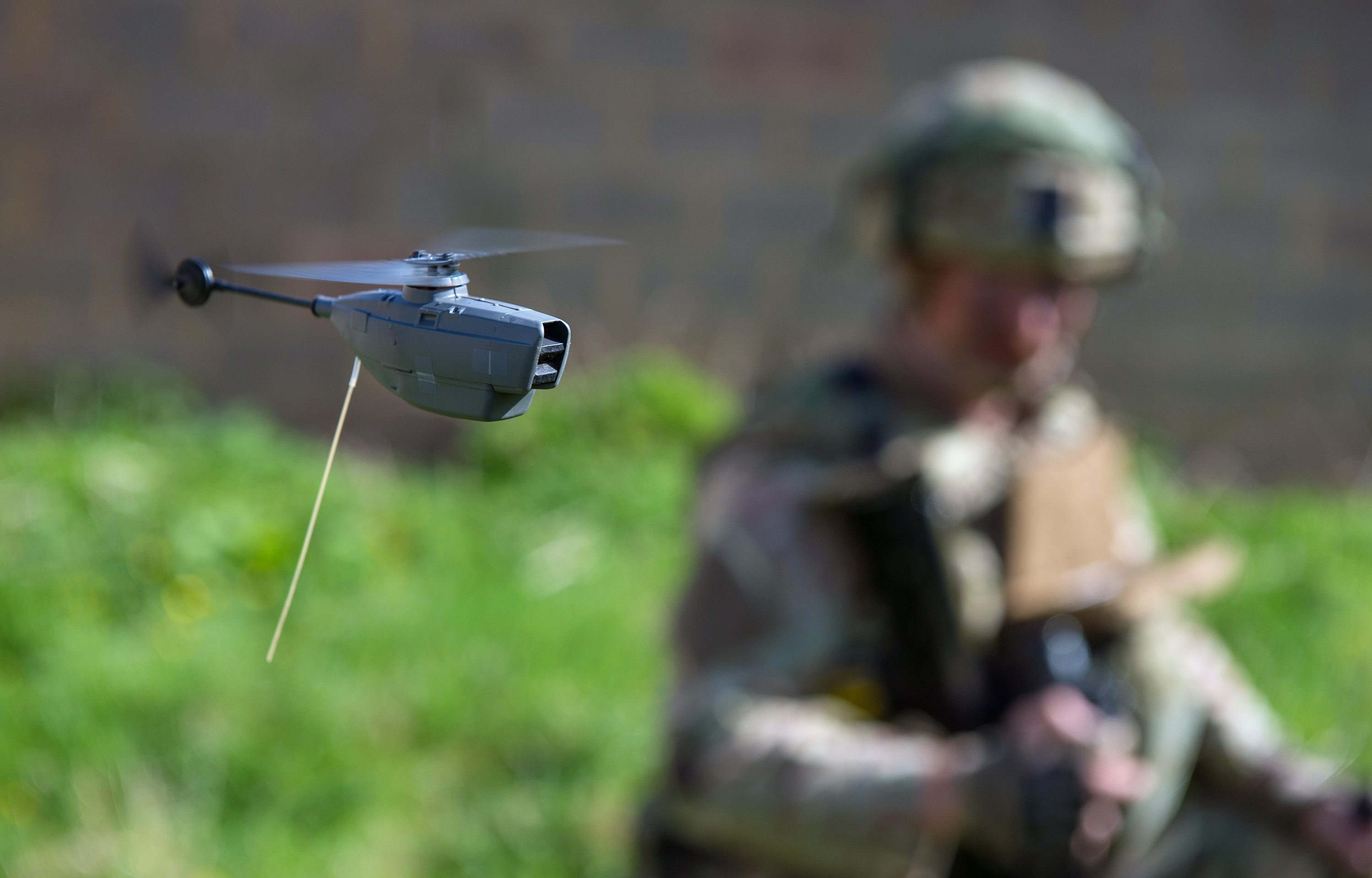
In flight, showing its antenna

=== Afghanistan ===
The aircraft was being used by soldiers from the UK's Brigade Reconnaissance Force at Camp Bastion in Afghanistan.

Operation Herrick personnel in Afghanistan deployed the Black Hornet from the front line to fly into enemy territory to take video and still images before returning to the operator. It was withdrawn from service in 2016/2017.

Designed to blend in with the muddy grey walls in Afghanistan, and capable of flying for 20 minutes on quiet electric motors, it has been used to look around corners or over walls and other obstacles to identify any hidden dangers and enemy positions.

== Usage ==
The Black Hornet is currently in use by the armed forces of Norway, the United States, France, the United Kingdom, Germany, Denmark, Algeria, Ireland, Australia, the Netherlands, Poland, New Zealand, India, Turkey, South Africa, Ukraine, Morocco and Vietnam.

By September 2016, the PD-100 Black Hornet was in use by the militaries of 19 NATO-allied countries.

=== United States ===
In July 2014, the United States Army Natick Soldier Research, Development and Engineering Center (NSRDEC) selected the PD-100 Black Hornet after looking at commercially available small-scale UAVs as part of the Cargo Pocket Intelligence, Surveillance, and Reconnaissance (CP-ISR) program.

It concluded that further refinements were needed for a U.S. Army role including reconfiguring the data-link, giving it night vision, and improving navigational capability.

The Black Hornet was tested with U.S. troops at an event in early March 2015, and Prox Dynamics delivered a PD-100 with upgraded features for special forces testing in June 2015.

By 2015, the Black Hornet had deployed with U.S. Marine Corps special operations teams.

Although the Army was seeking a mini-drone for use by individual squads through the Soldier Borne Sensors (SBS) program, the individually handmade Black Hornet was seen as too expensive for large-scale deployment, with a unit costing as much as US$195,000.

In 2018, the US Army bought 60 Hornet 3 drones, and in 2022 another 300.

The US Army bought an undisclosed number of Hornet 3 drones in 2023, some of them intended for Ukraine.

=== United Kingdom ===
In October 2013, the British Army had 324 Black Hornets in service.

The Black Hornet was retired in 2016 after Operation Herrick before being reintroduced through the Defence Equipment and Support programme in April 2019 for research and development into a capability gap identified by British Army HQ for brigade-level uncrewed reconnaissance.

== Users ==
- Algeria
  - 104th Operational Maneuvers Regiment
- Australia
  - Australian Army
- Denmark
  - Danish Armed Forces has bought the new Black Hornet PRS
- France
  - French Armed Forces
    - Special Operations Command
- Germany
  - German Army
- Greece
  - Hellenic Army
- India
  - National Security Guard
- Indonesia
  - Indonesian Army
- Malaysia
  - Malaysian Army
    - 21 Grup Gerak Khas
- Netherlands
  - Dutch Army
- New Zealand
  - New Zealand Special Air Service
- Norway
  - Norwegian Armed Forces
- Poland
  - Polish Armed Forces
- South Africa
  - South African Police Service
- Spain
  - Spanish Armed Forces
- Switzerland
  - Swiss Army
- Turkey
  - Turkish Land Forces
  - Special Forces Command
  - Gendarmerie General Command
- Ukraine
- United Kingdom
  - British Army
- United States
  - United States Marine Corps
  - Lee County Sheriff's Office
  - United States Army Cavalry Scouts
