= Comparative army officer ranks of Arabophone countries =

Rank comparison chart of officers for armies/land forces of Arabophone states.

== Officers ==
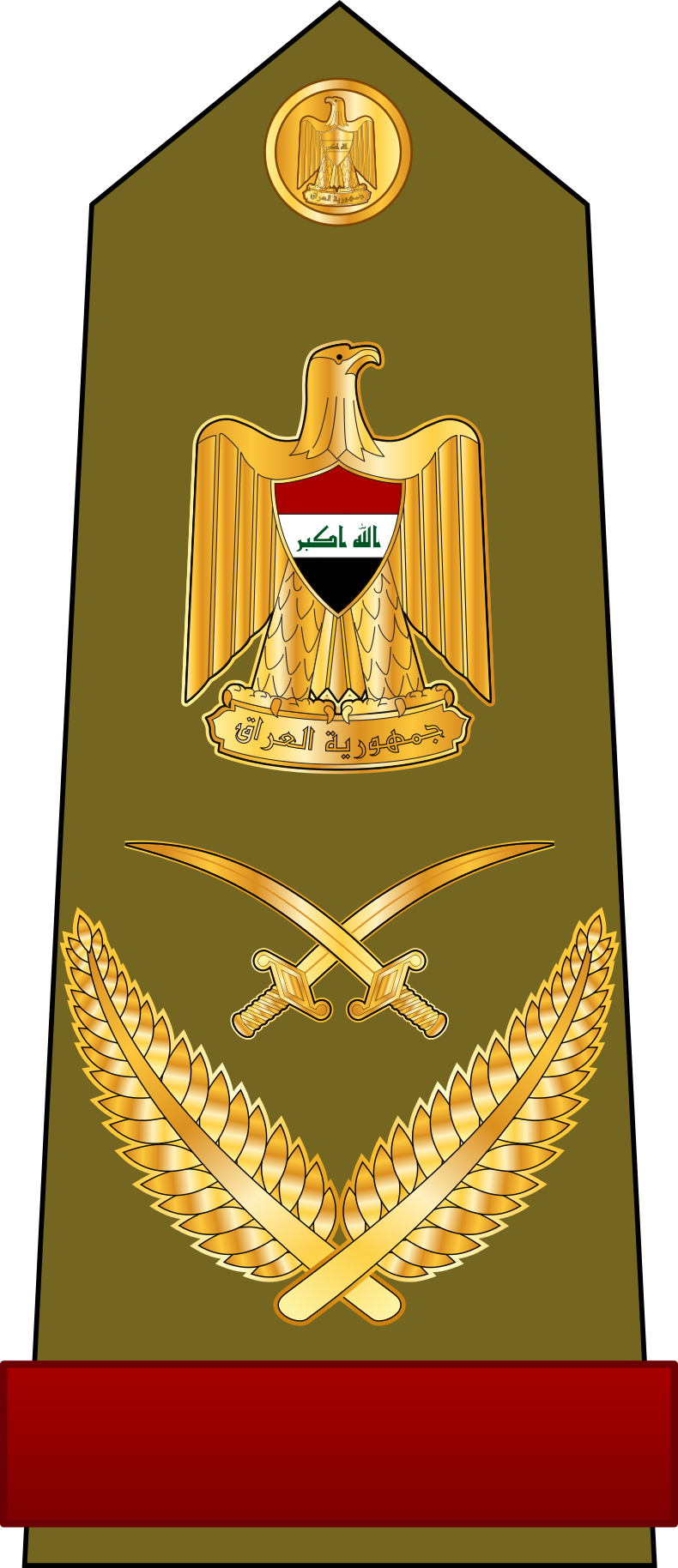
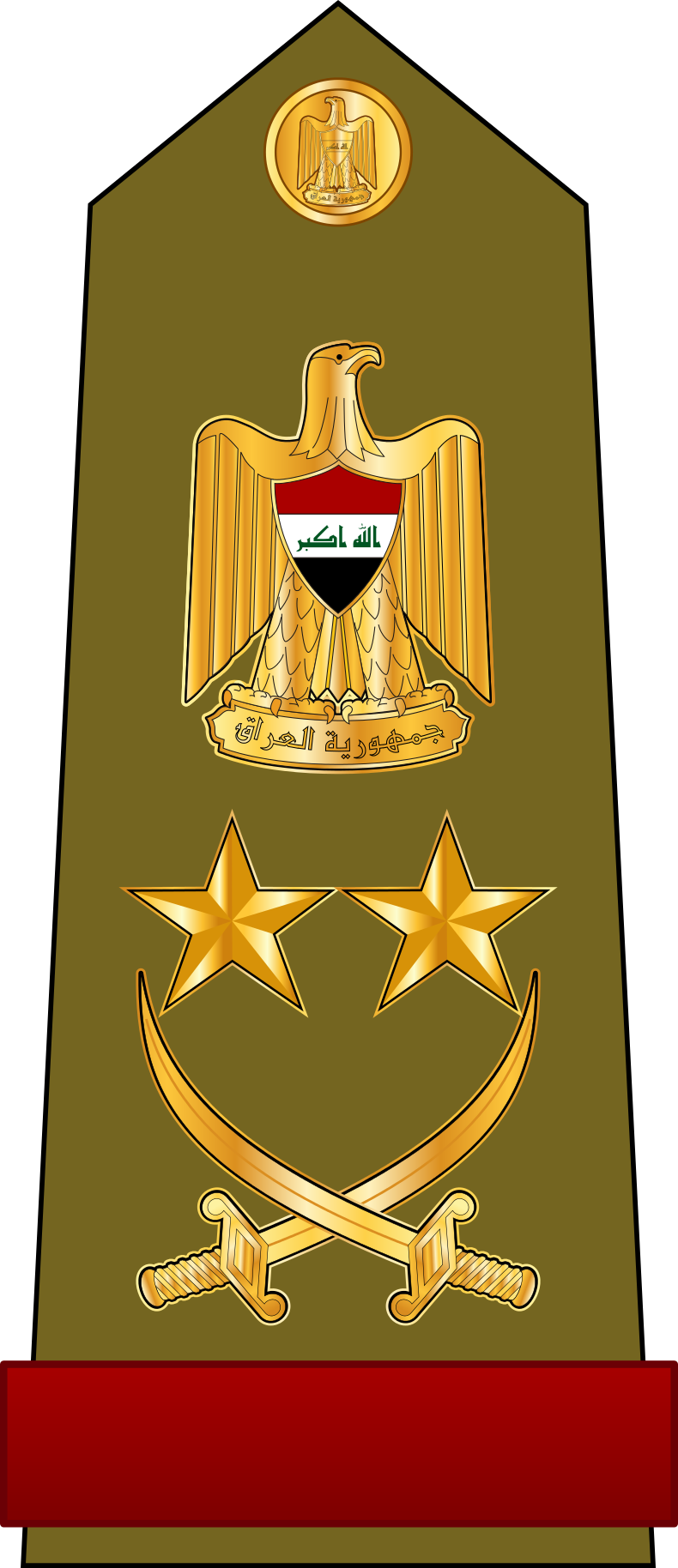
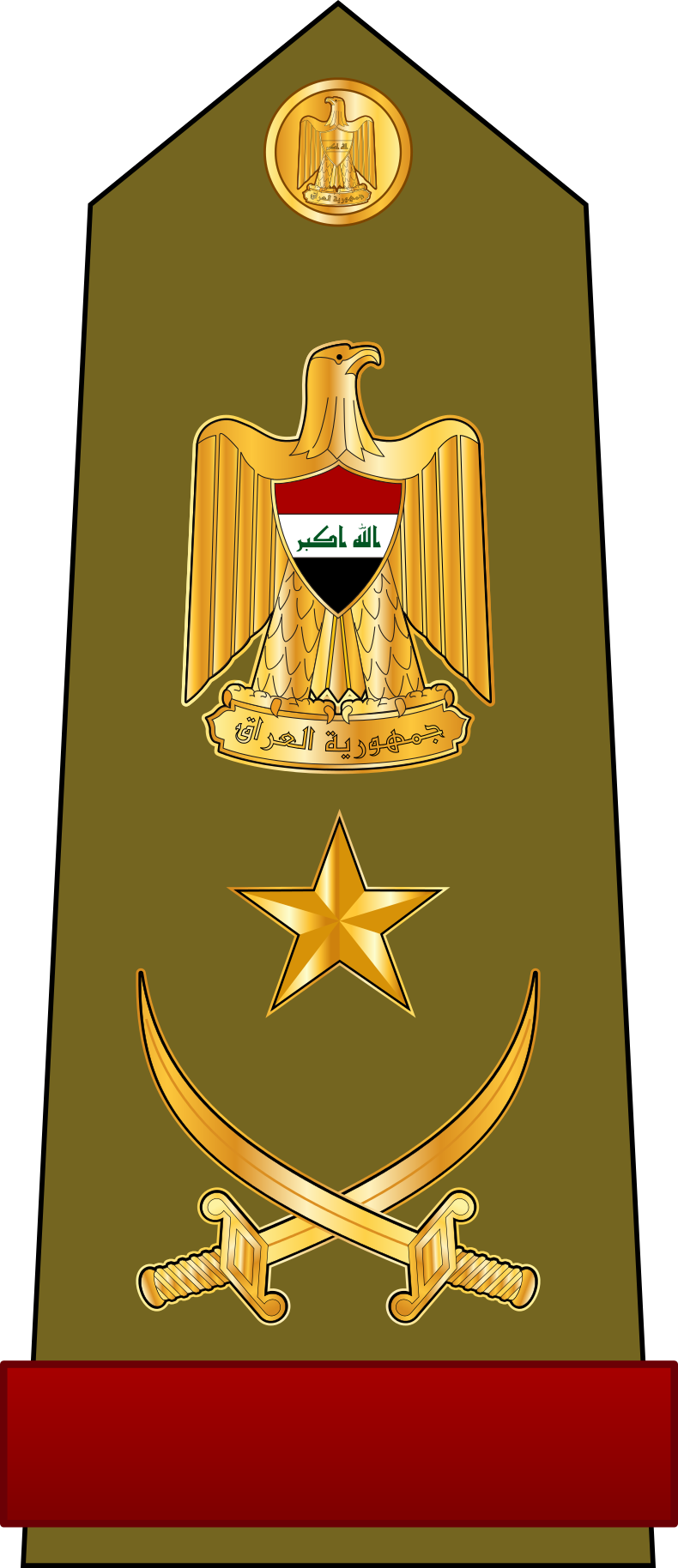
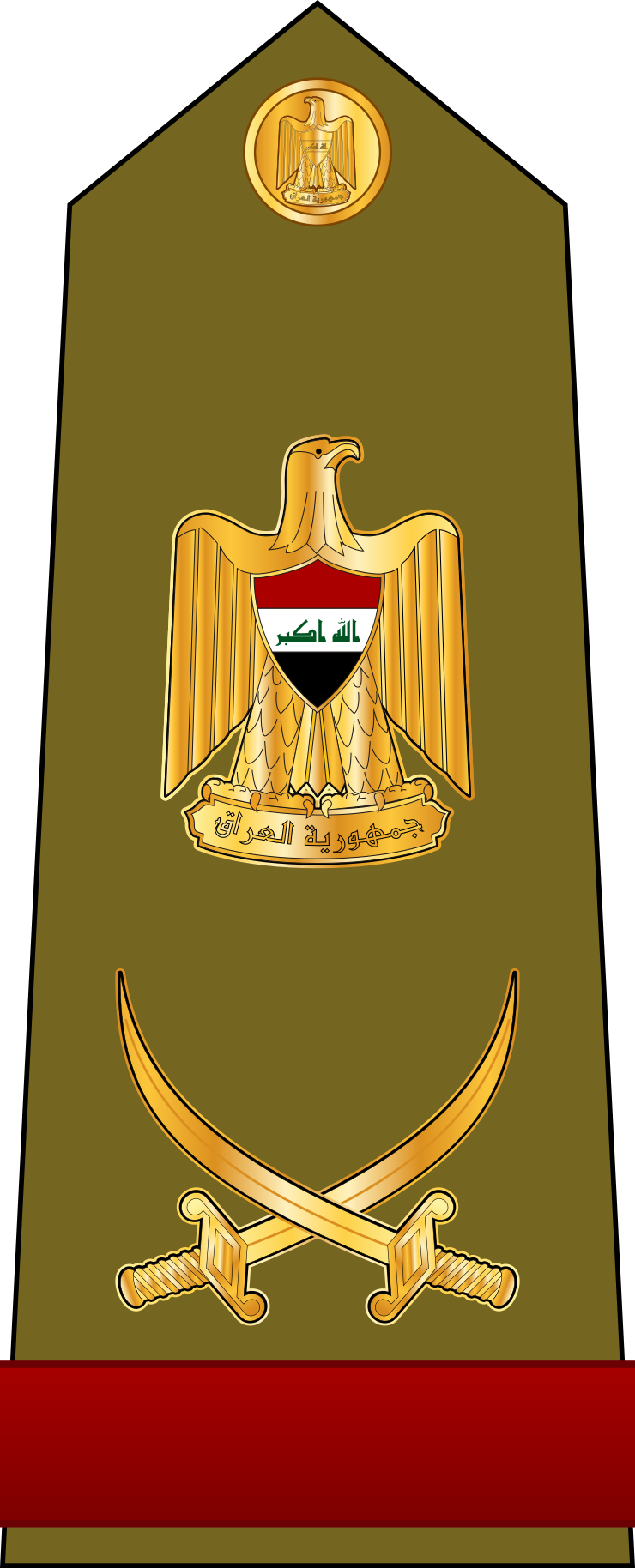
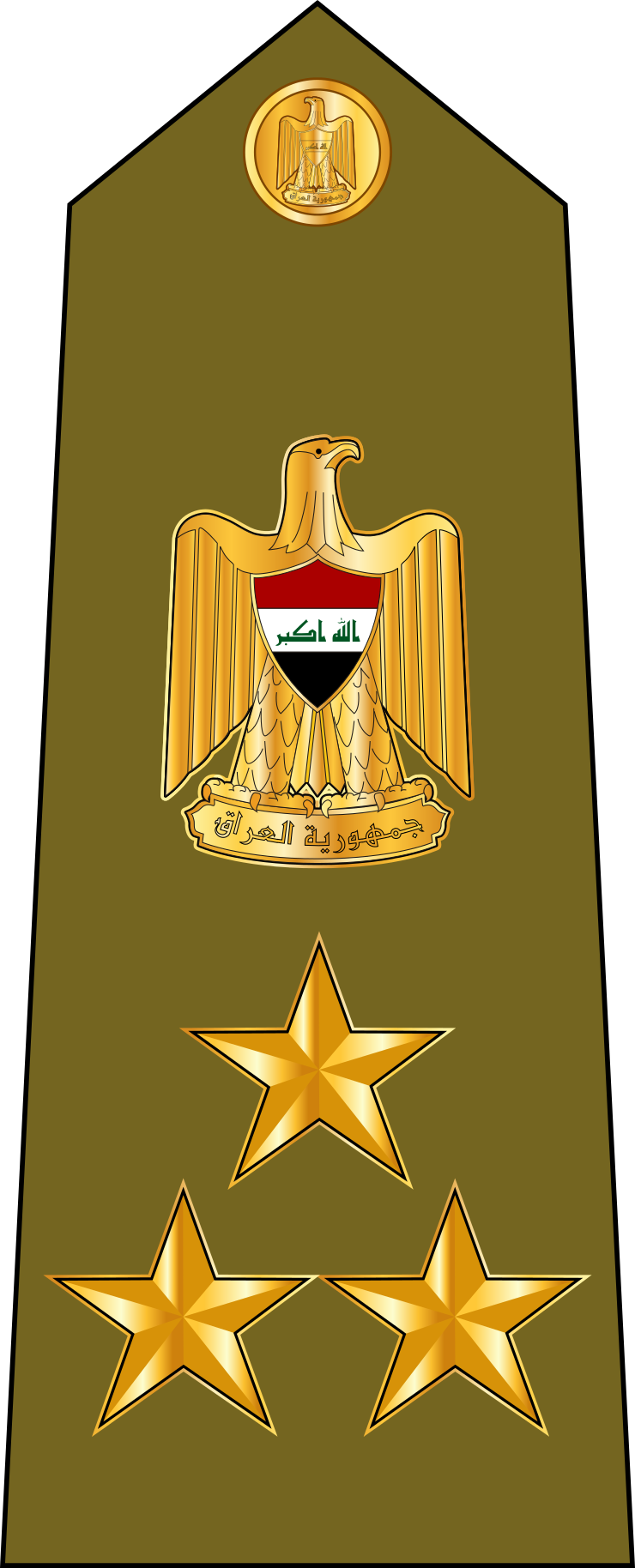
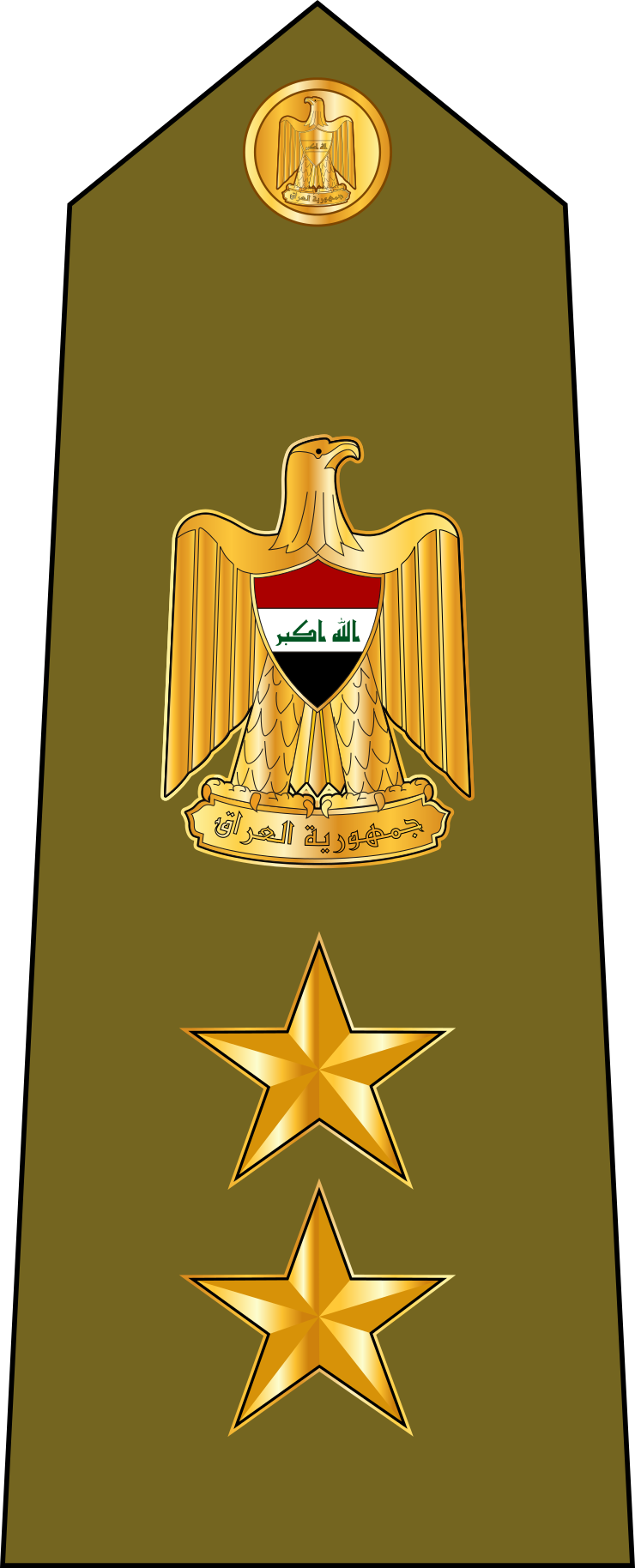
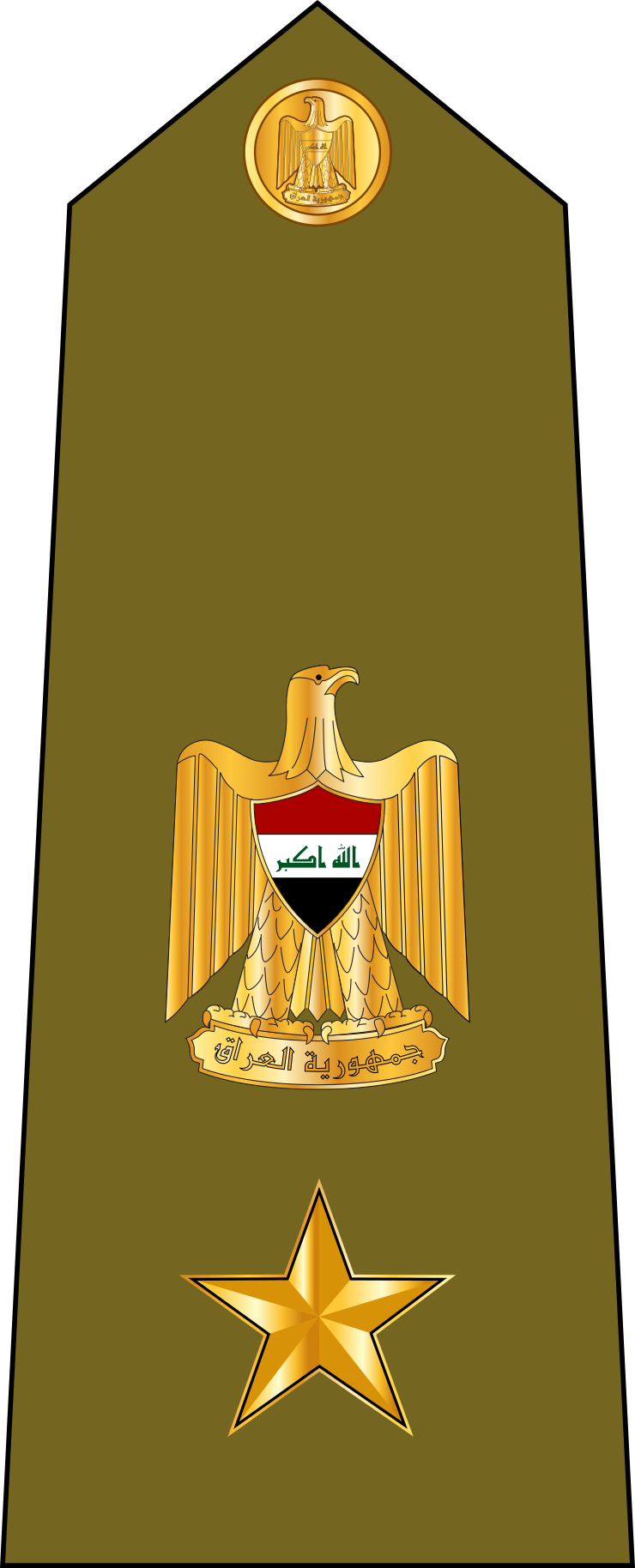
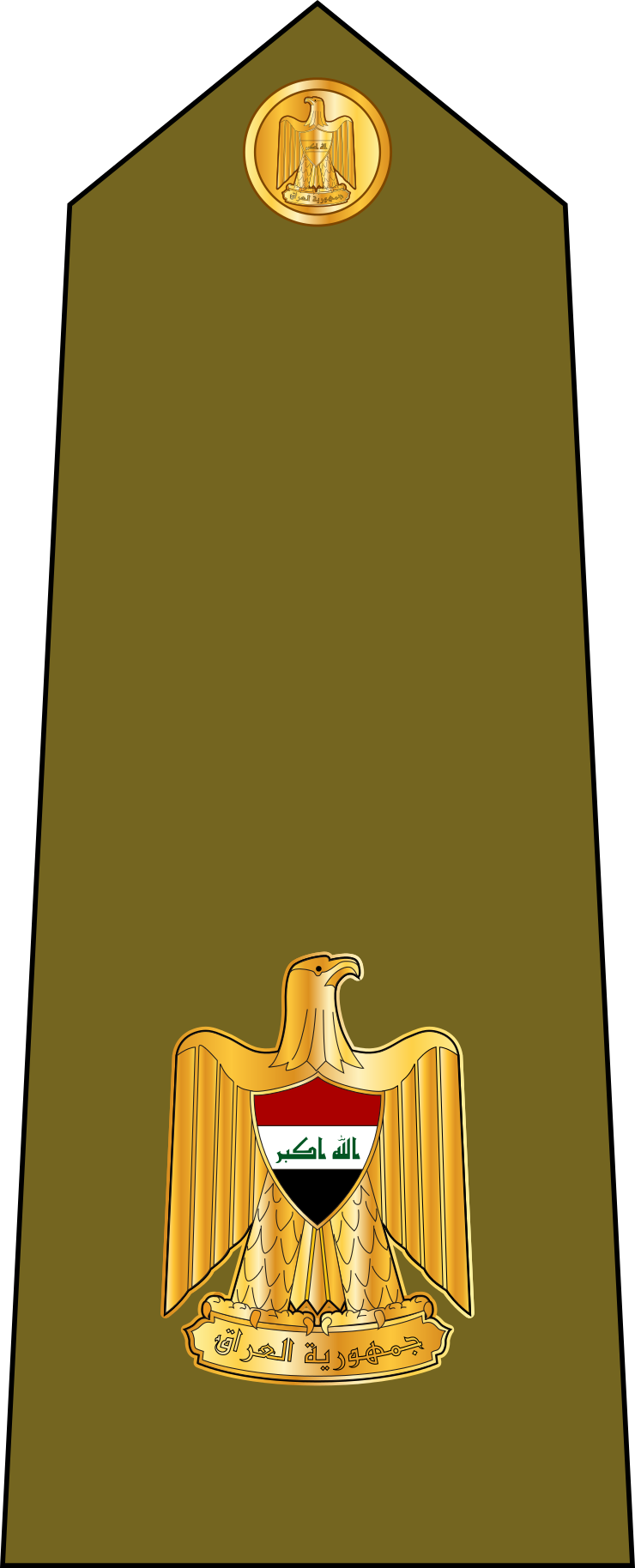
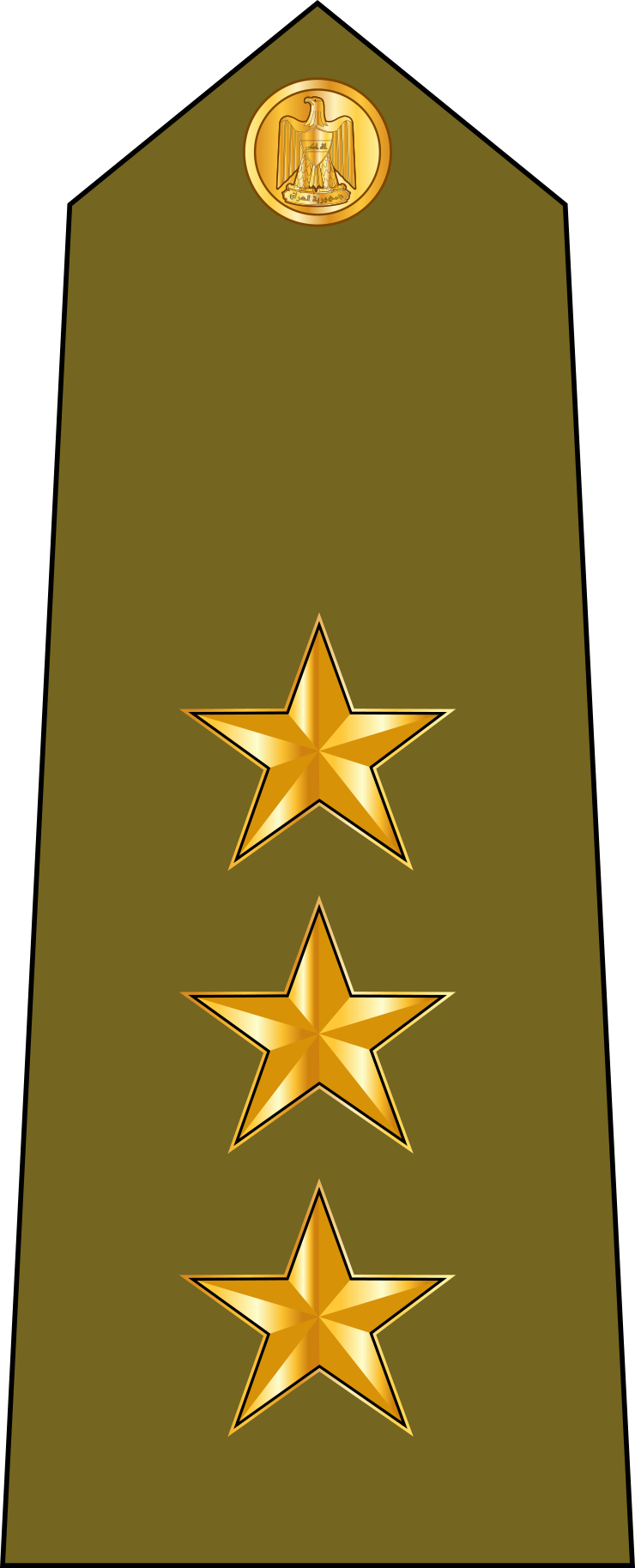
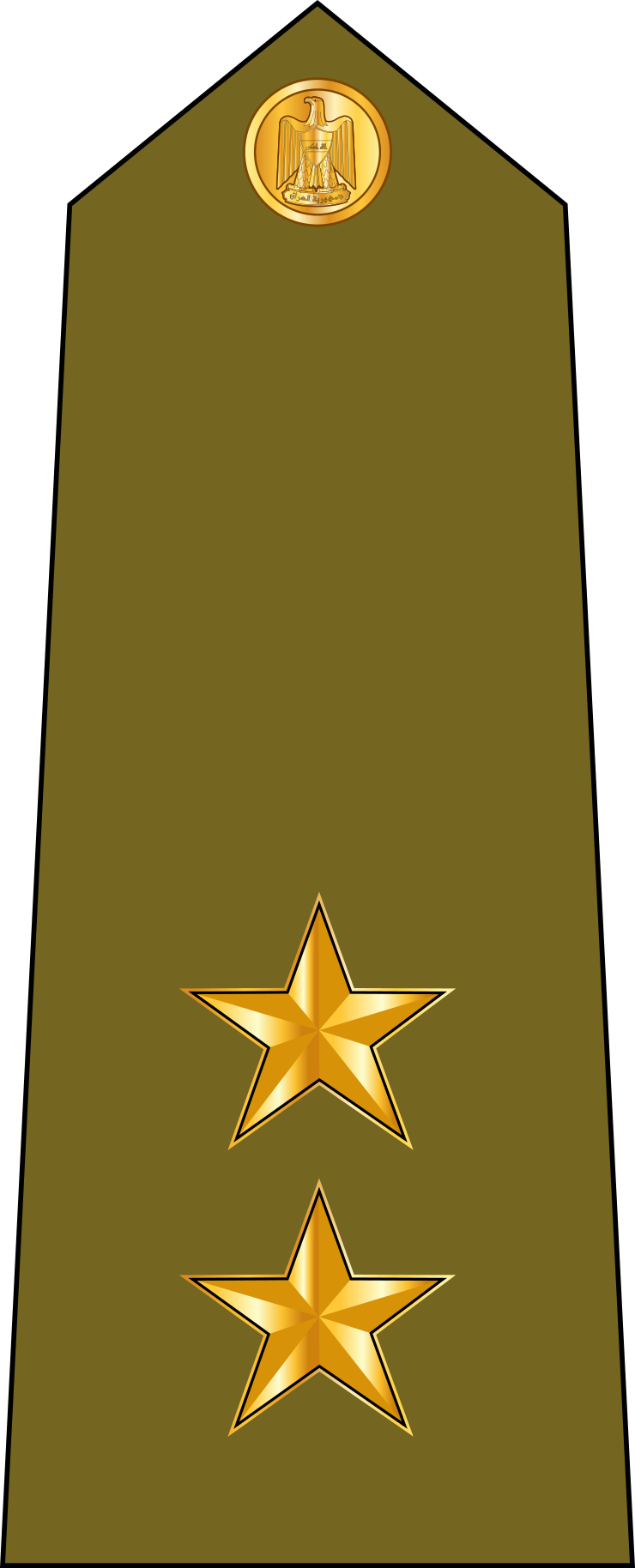
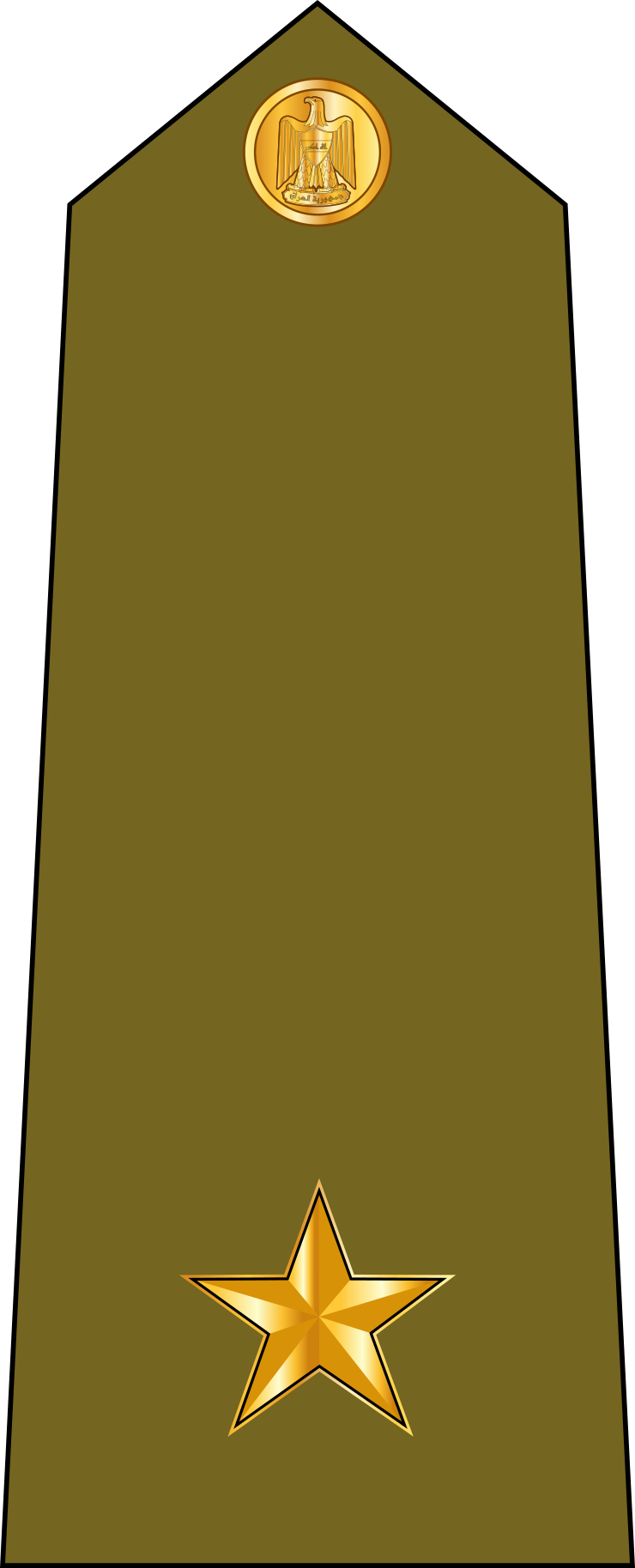
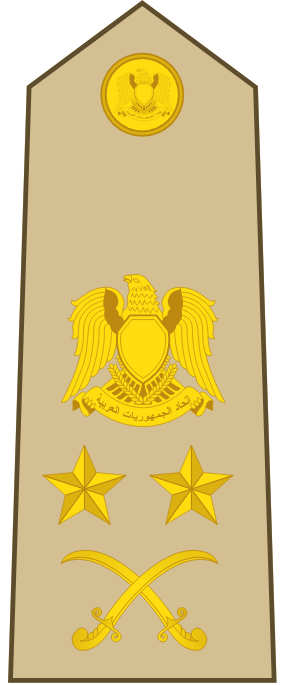
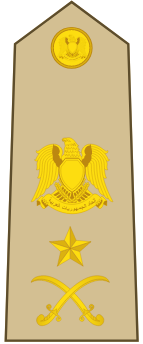
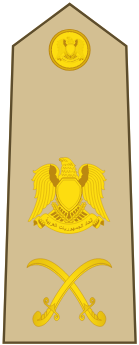
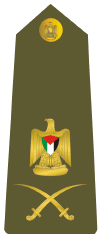
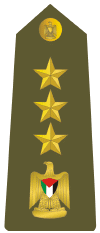
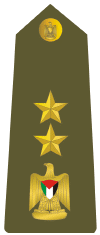
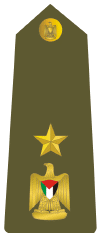
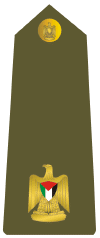
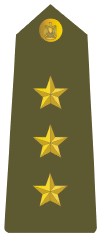
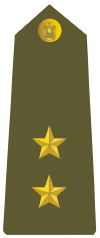
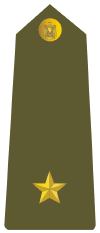
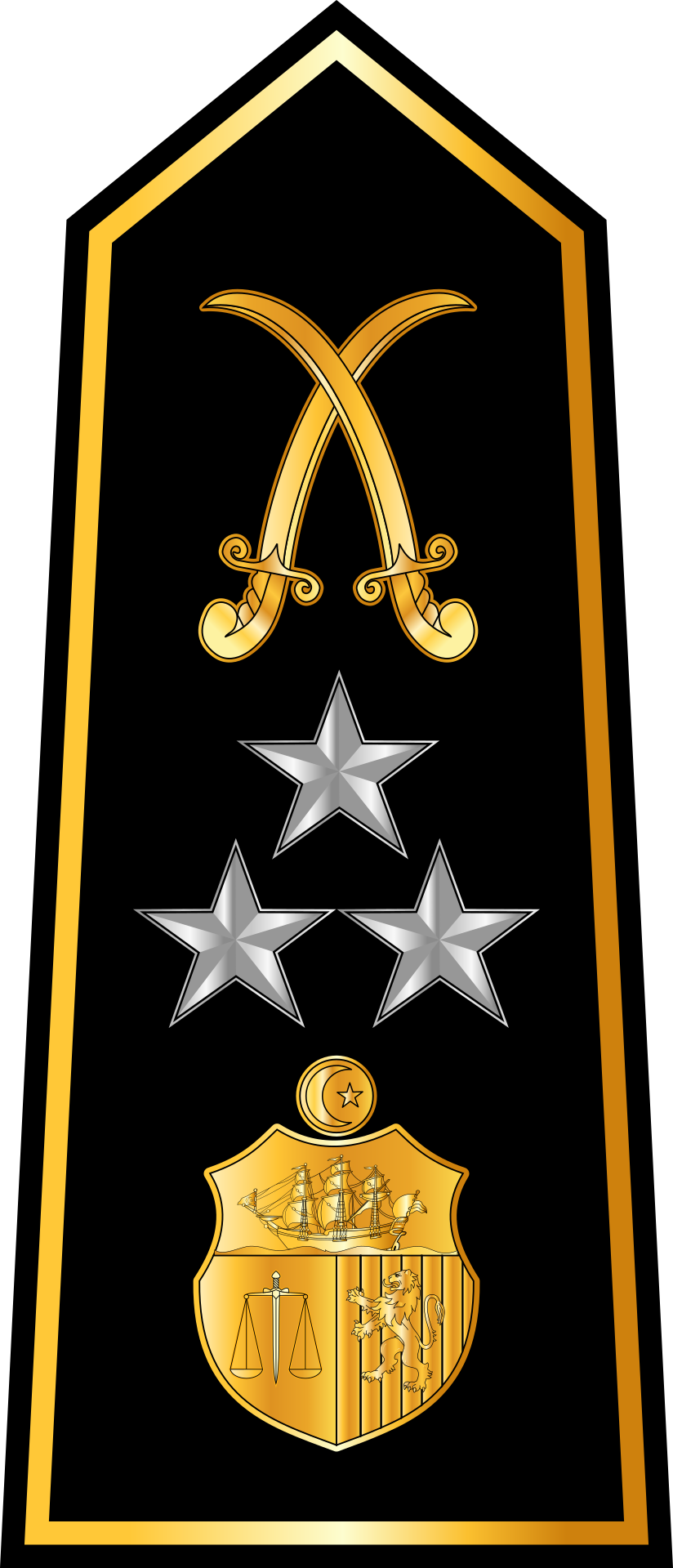
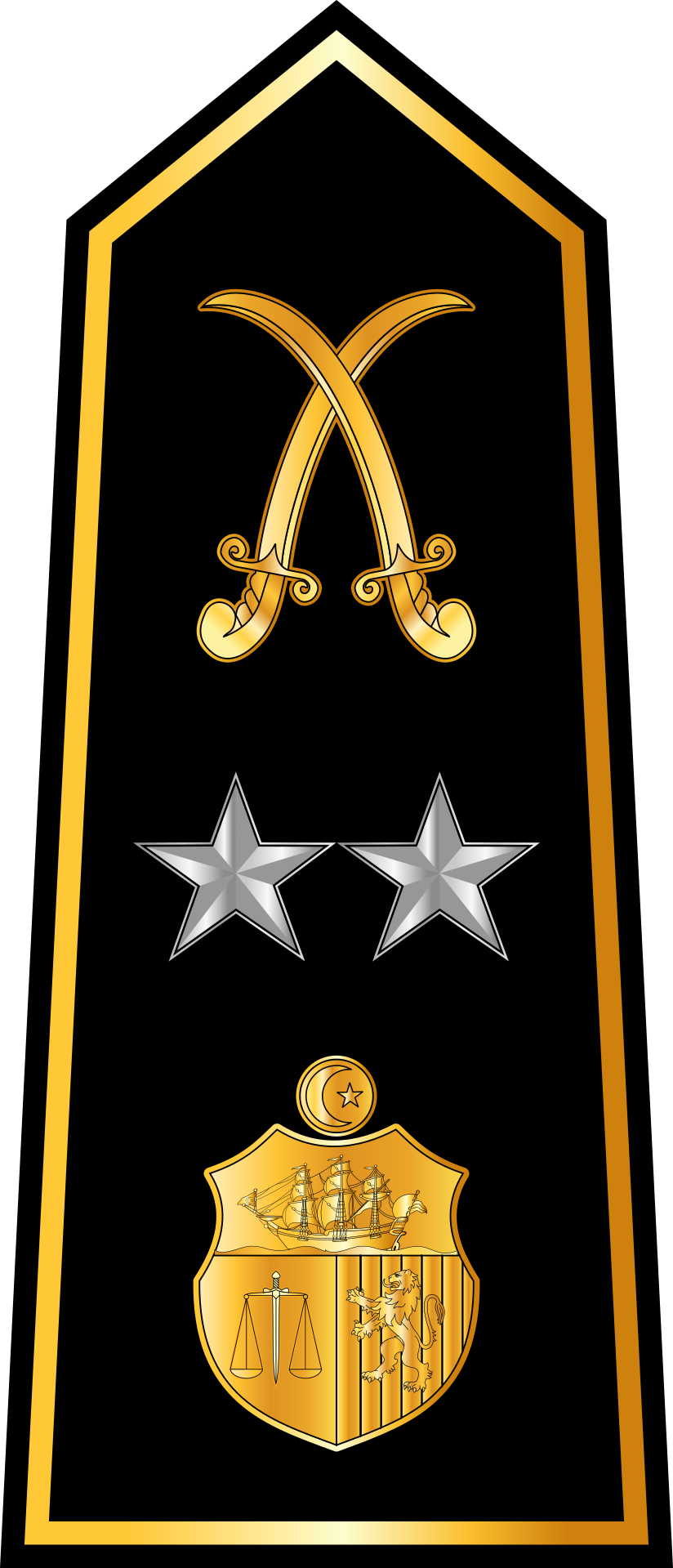
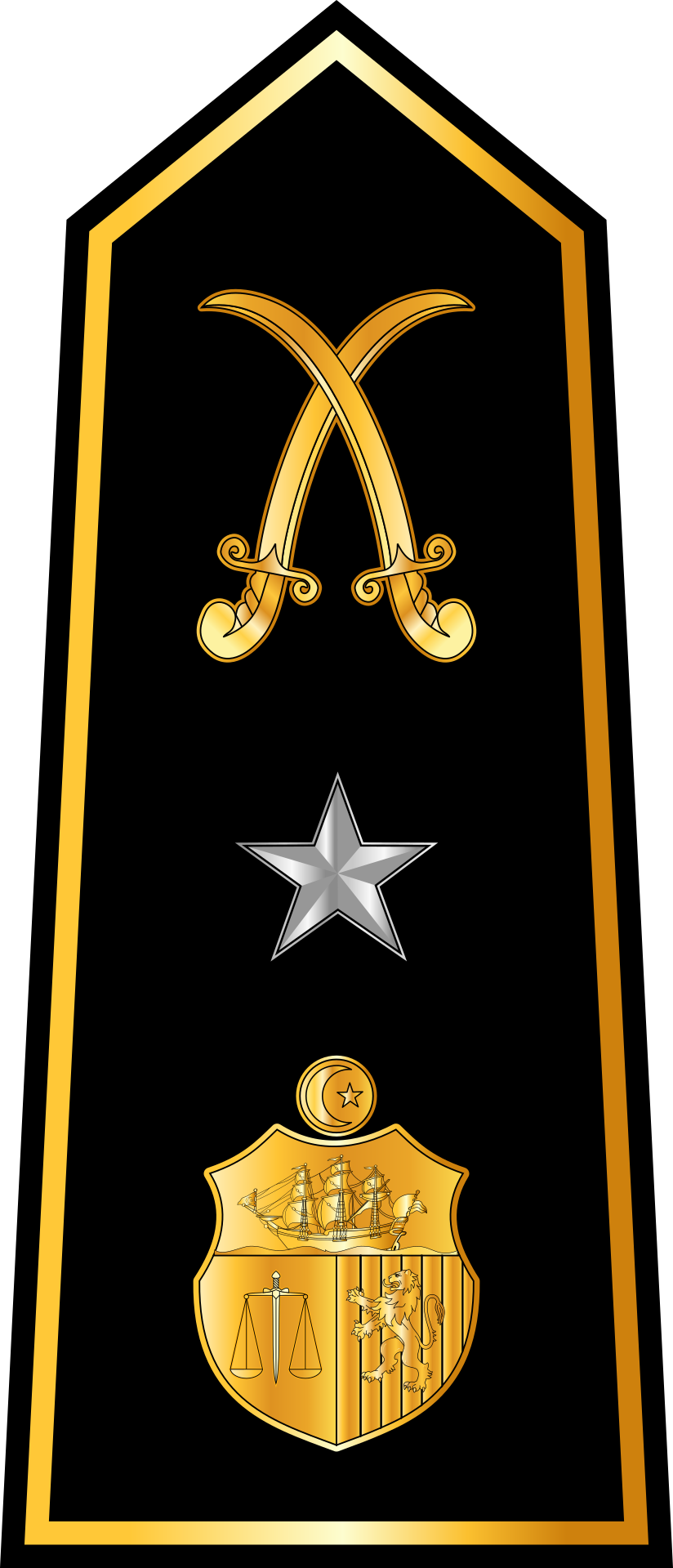
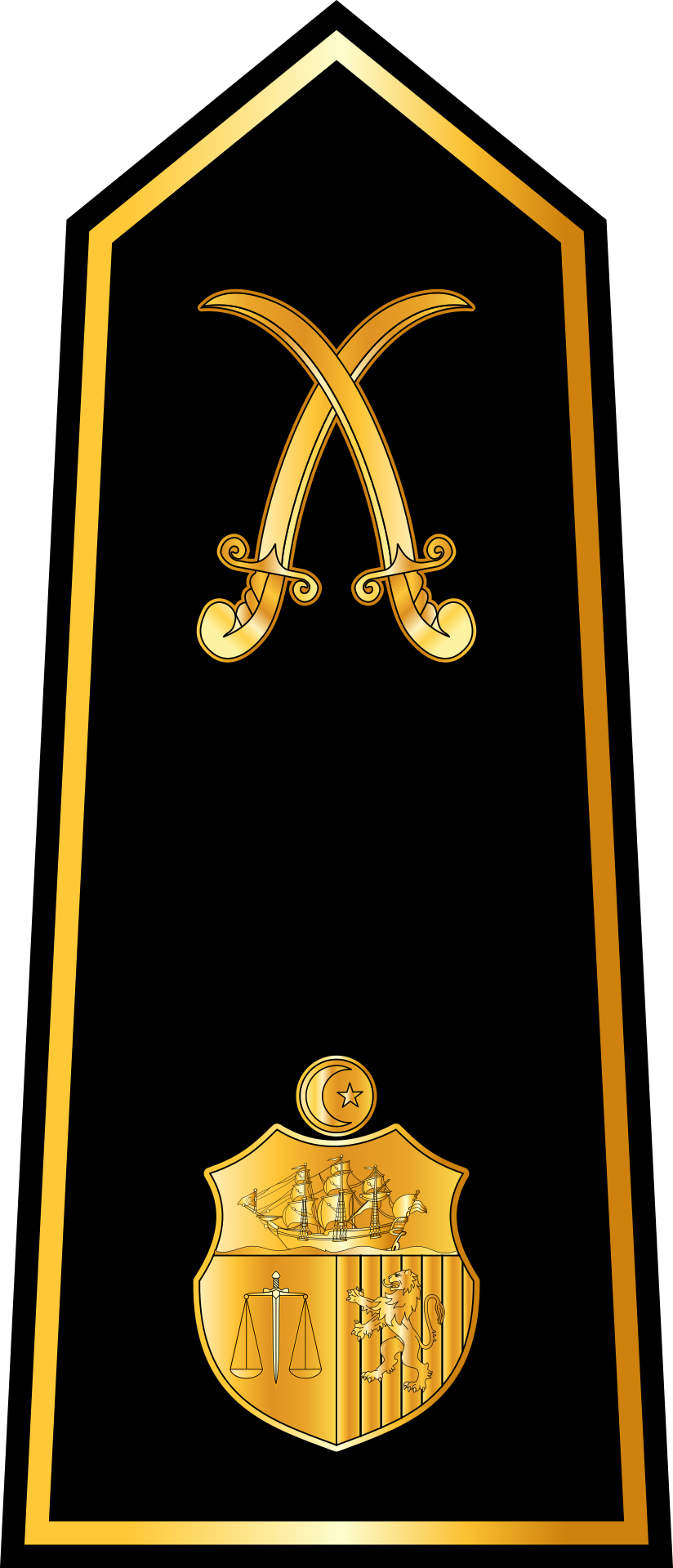
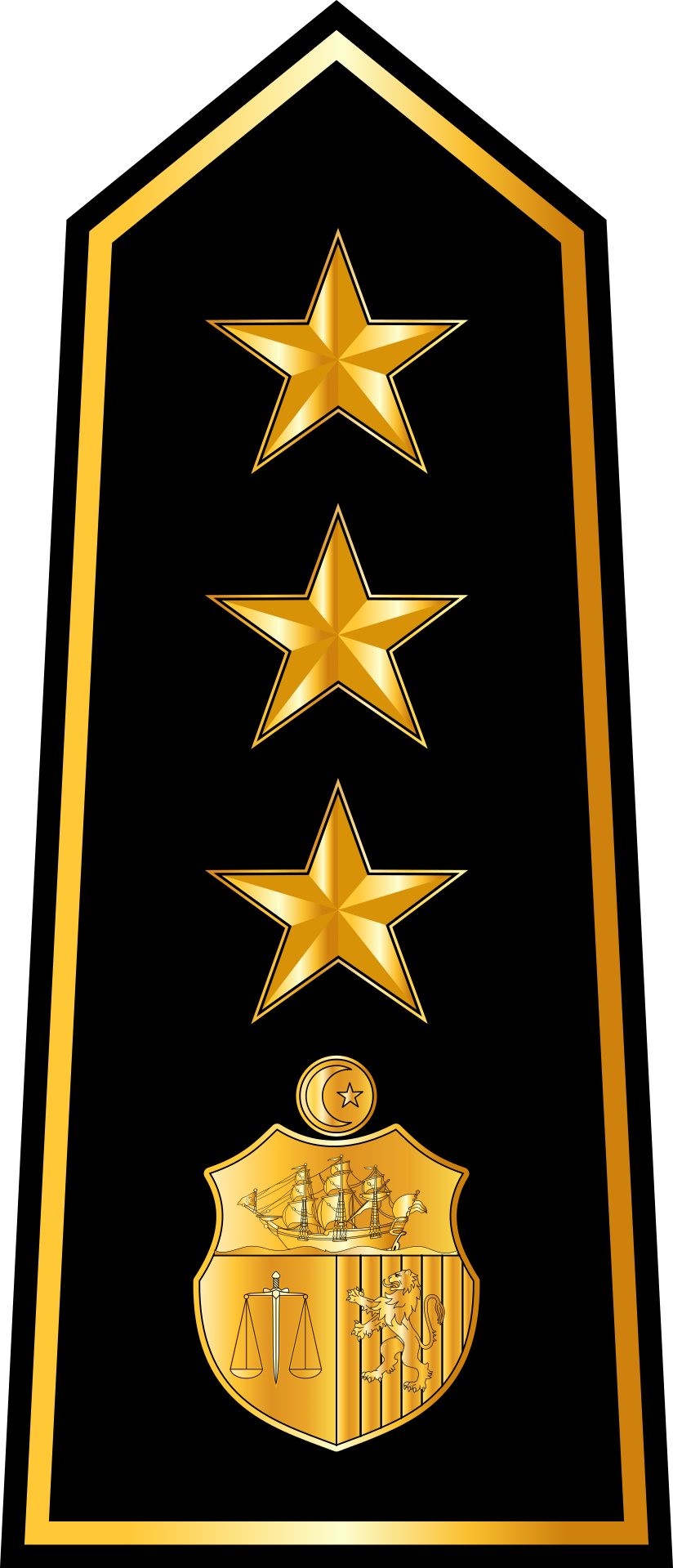
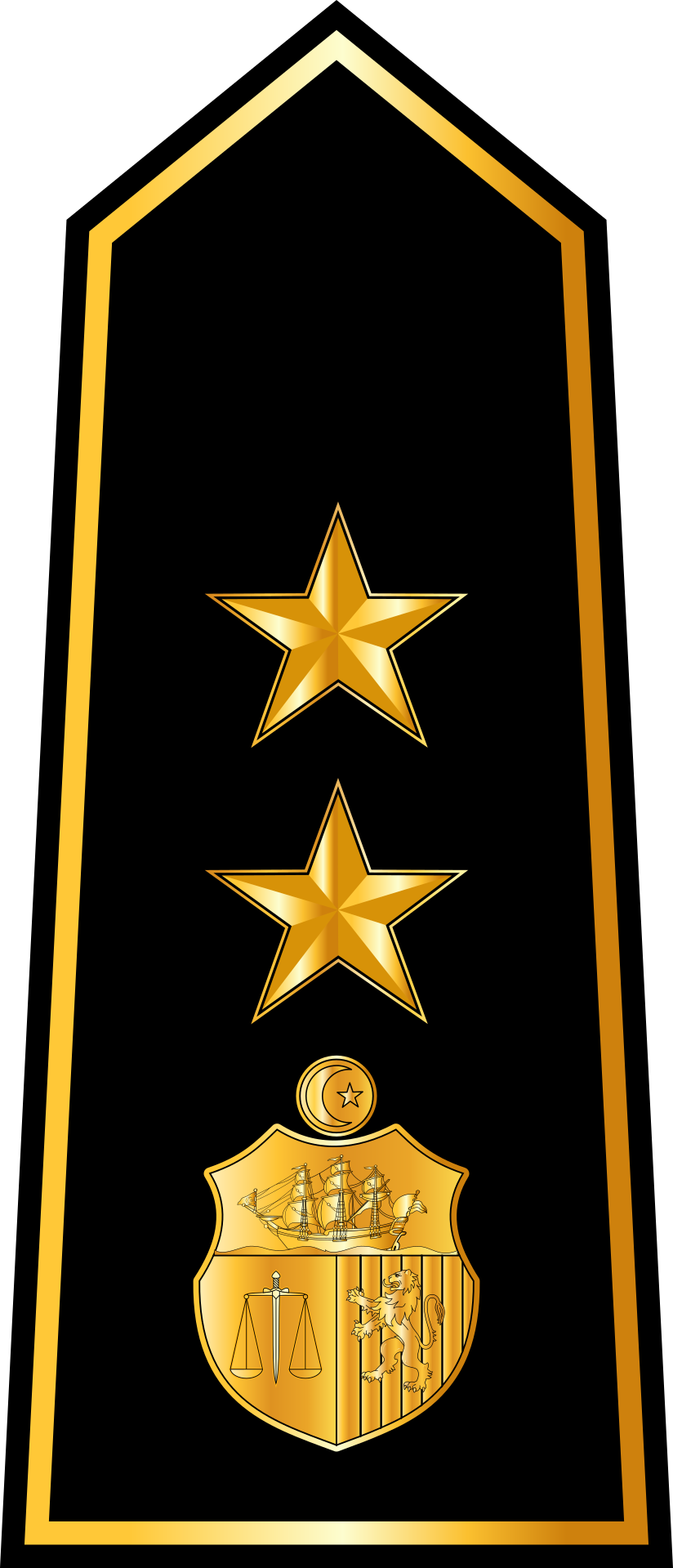
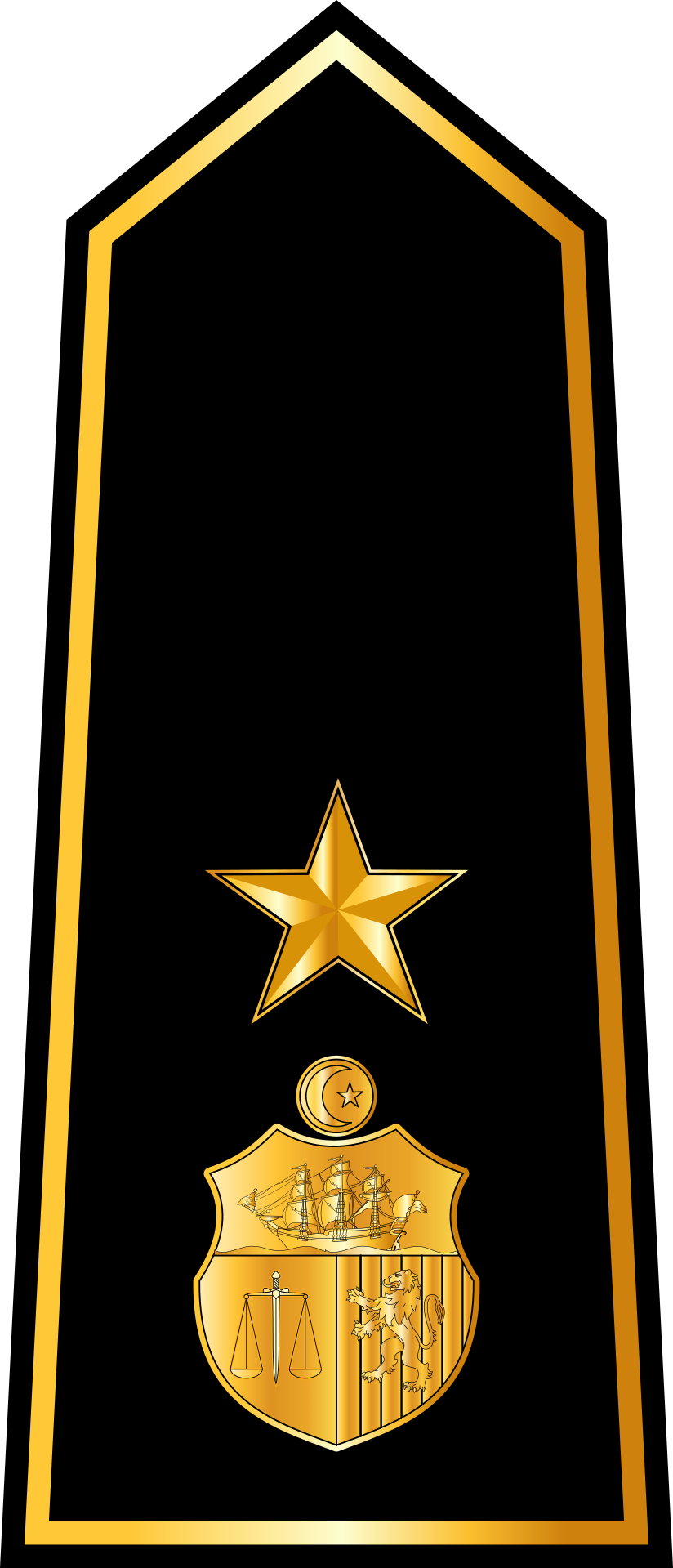
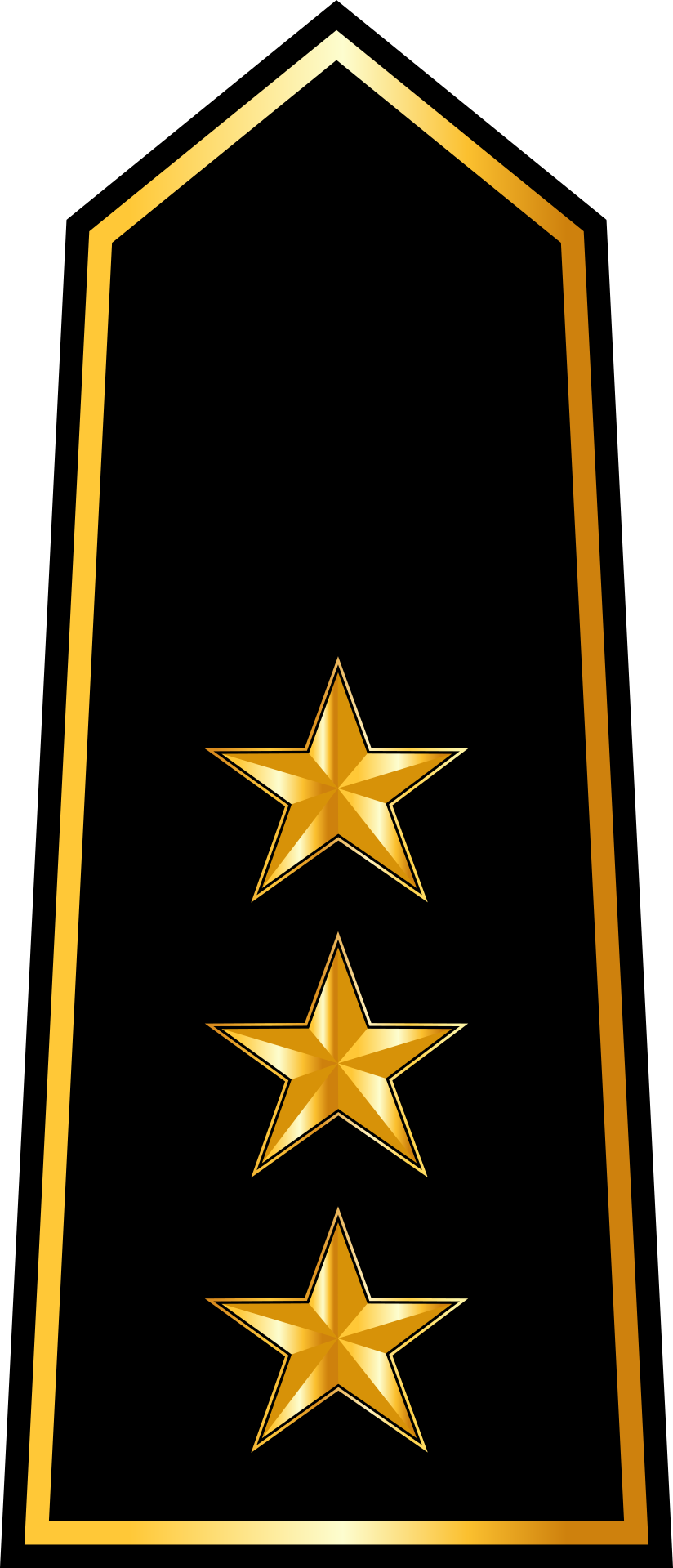
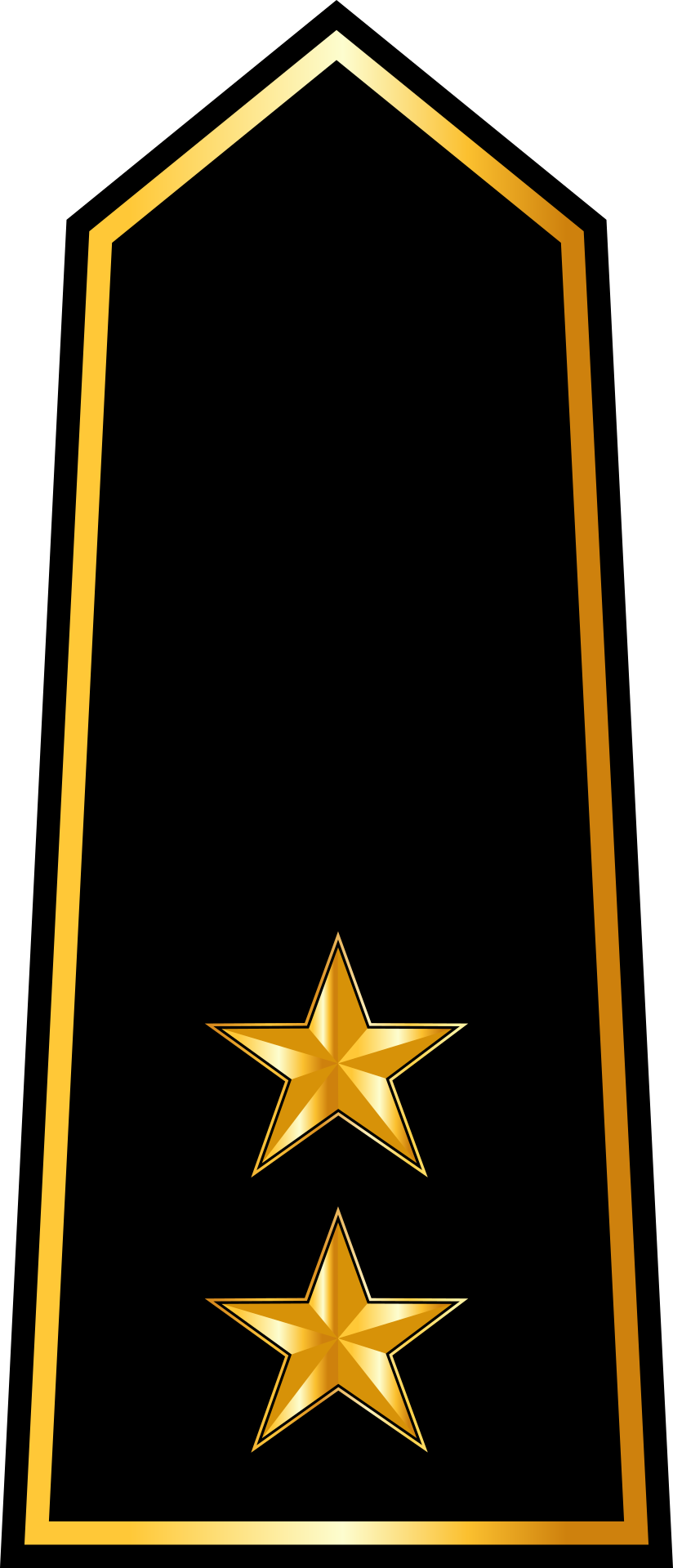
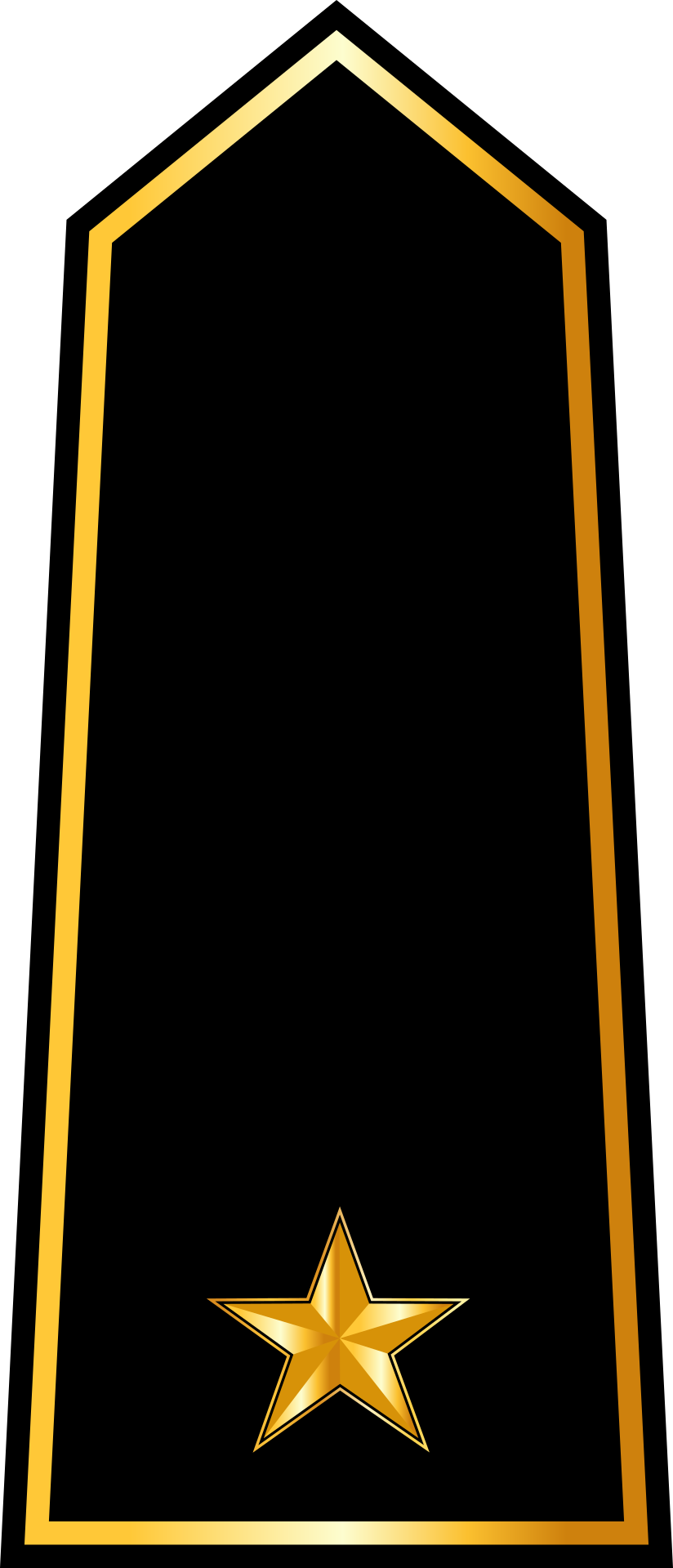
Rank group	General / flag officers					Senior officers				Junior officers
Algerian Land Forces
Algerian Land Forces		فريق أول; Farīq 'awwal	فريق; Farīq	لواء; Liwāʾ	عميد 'Amīd	عقيد 'Aqīd		مقدم; Muqaddam	رائد; Rā'id	نقيب; Naqīb	ملازم أول; Mulāzim 'awwal	ملازم; Mulāzim
Algerian Land Forces		Général d'armée	Général de corps d'armée	Général de division	Général	Colonel		Lieutenant-colonel	Commandant	Capitaine	Lieutenant	Sous-lieutenant
Royal Bahraini Army
Royal Bahraini Army	مشیر; Mushir	فريق أول; Fariq 'awal	فريق; Fariq	لواء; Liwa	عميد; Amid	عقيد; Aqid		مقدم; Muqaddam	رائد; Ra'id	نقيب; Naqib	ملازم أول; Mulazim awwal	ملازم; Mulazim
Comorian Army
Comorian Army				Général de division	Général de brigade	Colonel		Lieutenant-colonel	Commandant	Capitaine	Lieutenant	Sous-Lieutenant
Chadian Ground Forces
Chadian Ground Forces	Maréchal	Général d'armée	Général de corps	Général de division	Général de brigade	Colonel		Lieutenant-Colonel	Commandant	Capitaine	Lieutenant	Sous-Lieutenant
Djiboutian Army
Djiboutian Army				Général de division	Général de brigade	Colonel		Lieutenant-colonel	Commandant	Capitaine	Lieutenant	Sous-lieutenant
Egyptian Army
Egyptian Army	مشیر; Mushir	فريق أول; Fariq 'awal	فريق; Fariq	لواء; Liwa	عميد; Amid	عقيد; Aqid		مقدم; Muqaddam	رائد; Ra'id	نقيب; Naqib	ملازم أول; Mulazim awwal	ملازم; Mulazim
Eritrean Army
Eritrean Army				Major general	Brigadier general	Colonel		Lieutenant colonel	Major	Captain	First lieutenant	Second lieutenant
Iraqi Ground Forces
Iraqi Ground Forces	مشیر; Mushir	فريق أول; Fariq 'awal	فريق; Fariq	لواء; Liwa	عميد; Amid	عقيد; Aqid		مقدم; Muqaddam	رائد; Ra'id	نقيب; Naqib	ملازم أول; Mulazim awwal	ملازم; Mulazim
Royal Jordanian Army
Royal Jordanian Army	مشیر; Mushir	فريق أول; Fariq 'awal	فريق; Fariq	لواء; Liwa	عميد; Amid	عقيد; Aqid		مقدم; Muqaddam	رائد; Ra'id	نقيب; Naqib	ملازم أول; Mulazim awwal	ملازم; Mulazim
Kuwait Army
Kuwait Army		فريق أول; Fariq 'awal	فريق; Fariq	لواء; Liwa	عميد; Amid	عقيد; Aqid		مقدم; Muqaddam	رائد; Ra'id	نقيب; Naqib	ملازم أول; Mulazim awwal	ملازم; Mulazim
Lebanese Ground Forces
Lebanese Ground Forces			عماد; Eimad	لواء; Liwa	عميد; Amid	عقيد; Aqid		مقدم; Muqaddam	رائد; Ra'id	نقيب; Naqib	ملازم أول; Mulazim awwal	ملازم; Mulazim
Libyan Ground Forces
Libyan Ground Forces	مشير; Mushir	فريق أول; Fariq 'awal	فريق; Fariq	لواء; Liwa	عميد; Amid	عقيد; Aqid		مقدم; Muqaddam	رائد; Ra'id	نقيب; Naqib	ملازم أول; Mulazim awwal	ملازم; Mulazim
Malian Army
Malian Army		Général d'armée	Général de corps d'armée	Général de division	Général de brigade	Colonel-major	Colonel	Lieutenant-colonel	Commandant	Capitaine	Lieutenant	Sous-lieutenant
Mauritanian National Army
Mauritanian National Army			فريق; Fariq	لواء; Liwa		عميد; Amid		مقدم; Muqaddam	رائد; Ra'id	نقيب; Naqib	ملازم أول; Mulazim awwal	ملازم; Mulazim
Royal Moroccan Army
Royal Moroccan Army	Maréchal	Général d'armée	Général de corps d'armée	Général de division	Général de brigade	Colonel-major	Colonel	Lieutenant-colonel	Commandant	Capitaine	Lieutenant	Sous-lieutenant
Royal Army of Oman
Royal Army of Oman	مشیر; Mushir	فريق أول; Fariq 'awal	فريق; Fariq	لواء; Liwa	عميد; Amid	عقيد; Aqid		مقدم; Muqaddam	رائد; Ra'id	نقيب; Naqib	ملازم أول; Mulazim awwal	ملازم; Mulazim
Palestinian National Security Forces
Palestinian National Security Forces				لواء 'Malaz	عميد; Eamid	عقيد; Eaqid		مقدم; Muqaddam	رائد; Rayid	نقيب; Naqib	ملازم أول; Mulazim awwal	ملازم; Mulazim
Qatari Emiri Land Force
Qatari Emiri Land Force		فريق أول; Fariq 'awal	فريق; Fariq	لواء; Liwa	عميد; Amid	عقيد; Aqid		مقدم; Muqaddam	رائد; Ra'id	نقيب; Naqib	ملازم أول; Mulazim awwal	ملازم; Mulazim
Saudi Arabian Army
Saudi Arabian Army		فريق أول; Fariq 'awal	فريق; Fariq	لواء; Liwa	عميد; Amid	عقيد; Aqid		مقدم; Muqaddam	رائد; Ra'id	نقيب; Naqib	ملازم أول; Mulazim awwal	ملازم; Mulazim
Somali National Army
Somali National Army			Sareeye guud	Sareeye gaas	Sareeye guuto	Gashaanle sare		Gashaanle dhexe	Gashaanle	Dhamme	Laba xídígle	Xídígle
Somaliland National Army
Somaliland National Army			Sareeye guud	Sareeye gaas	Sareeye guuto	Gashaanle sare		Gashaanle dhexe	Gashaanle	Dhamme	Laba xídígle	Xídígle
Sudanese Army
Sudanese Army	مشیر; Mushir	فريق أول; Fariq 'awal	فريق; Fariq	لواء; Liwa	عميد; Amid	عقيد; Aqid		مقدم; Muqaddam	رائد; Ra'id	نقيب; Naqib	ملازم أول; Mulazim awwal	ملازم; Mulazim
Syrian Army
Syrian Army	فريق; Fariq	عماد أول; Eimad 'awal	عماد; Eimad	لواء; Alliwa'	عميد; Amid	عقيد; Aqid		مقدم; Muqaddam	رائد; Ra'id	نقيب; Naqib	ملازم أول; Mulazim awwal	ملازم; Mulazim
Tunisian Army
Tunisian Army			فريق أول; Fariq 'awal	فريق; Fariq	أمير لواء 'amir liwa'	عميد; Amid	عقيد; Aqid	مقدم; Muqaddam	رائد; Ra'id	نقيب; Naqib	ملازم أول; Mulazim awwal	ملازم; Mulazim
Tunisian Army			Général de corps d'armée	Général de division	Général de brigade	Colonel-major	Colonel	Lieutenant-colonel	Commandant	Capitaine	Lieutenant	Sous-lieutenant
United Arab Emirates Army
United Arab Emirates Army		فريق أول; Fariq 'awal	فريق; Fariq	لواء; Liwa	عميد; Amid	عقيد; Aqid		مقدم; Muqaddam	رائد; Ra'id	نقيب; Naqib	ملازم أول; Mulazim awwal	ملازم; Mulazim
Yemeni Land Forces
Yemeni Land Forces	مشیر; Mushir	فريق أول; Fariq 'awal	فريق; Fariq	لواء; Liwa	عميد; Amid	عقيد; Aqid		مقدم; Muqaddam	رائد; Ra'id	نقيب; Naqib	ملازم أول; Mulazim awwal	ملازم ثان; Mulazim than
Rank group	General / flag officers					Senior officers				Junior officers
