= 104th Operational Maneuvers Regiment =

Algerian Land Forces special forces unit

- Motto: Capacity & Accuracy
- Founded: November, 2, 2005
- Service branches: Algerian Land Forces
- Headquarters: Boghar

Leadership
- Minister of Defence: Minister of National Defence

The 104th Operational Maneuvers Regiment (104th RMO; Arabic: الفوج 104 للمناورات العملياتية) is a special forces regiment of the Algerian Land Forces, and is also a parachute regiment.

== History ==
The 104th Operational Maneuver Regiment was created on November 2, 2005 by a presidential decree in order to support the former Algerian GIS and to participate in anti-terrorist operations in Algeria.

Moreover, the Algerian Land Forces wanted to have their own special forces regiment at the time, as they previously had only shock units, the Parachute Commando Regiments (RPC), which are not special forces but specialized units similar to the 75th Rangers regiment of the US army. Because of their training with the Special Forces "green berets", the 104th RMO has adopted an organization that is very much inspired by the latter as well as by NATO-type special forces units.

It is considered as the Algerian equivalent of the US Special Forces, the latter have also benefited from training, training and advanced courses abroad as in the United States, where they regularly visit the US green berets.

The headquarters of the 104th RMO is also located in the same city as the Commando Training and Initiation to Parachuting School (EFCIP) in Boghar.

== Objectives ==
The 104th RMO has several combat companies, each with its own specificities and specialties.

- A staff
- A LRRP company, specialized in reconnaissance and destruction in depth; it uses light armed patrol vehicles.
- An urban combat company. This company also includes bodyguards, marksman, counterterrorism and Hostage Rescue groups.
- A reconnaissance company, specialized in intelligence acquisition, search and neutralization at long range. It has within its ranks groups of snipers.
- A detection and assault company, specialized in special actions and combat in degraded environments, such as high mountains or dense forests. In addition, these operators are trained in mountaineering and crossing techniques (canyons, cliffs, bodies of water...).
- A support company, whose members are particularly oriented towards the 3rd dimension and the aquatic environment. In particular, it has groups of operational jumpers as well as amphibious assault groups.
- A training company, which provides selection, basic training and advanced training courses. The Specialized Training Group provides advanced and specialized training courses, such as sniper, hostage rescue, counterterrorism, close protection... The company also has facilities for "drill" buildings, helicopter models, and areas for reconstruction of houses, corridors, apartments... It also provides advanced training to other special or intervention units in Algeria, such as the RSI of the Republican Guard or the DSI of the Gendarmerie, but it can also train foreign units.

== Training ==
The 104th RMO operators are trained in the Special Troops Superior School (ESTS) in Biskra for the skydiving and the special operations, and they are trained as well in the commando and parachute training and initiation (EFCIP) in Boghar on commando techniques, survival, healing and second level special operations. For that the 104th RMO has a training platform with several buildings and houses in order for the 104th RMO operators to practice counter terrorism and hostage rescue training.

Moreover, they are foreign-trained including in United States and in Russia.

== Resources ==
=== Vehicles ===
- All-terrain tactical vehicles Toyota Land Cruiser, Mercedes-Benz G class, Nissan Patrol etc...

==== Special vehicle ====
- Vehicle 4×4 Ford F-150 with Mobile Adjustable Ramp System (MARS)
- Humvee in different configurations: troop transport, patrol vehicle, armored transport vehicle.
- Nimr

=== Air assets ===
- Mil Mi-171Sh of the Algerian Air Force
- Transports aircraft of the Algerian Air Force (C130, Casa C295, Il-76...)

== Pictures ==
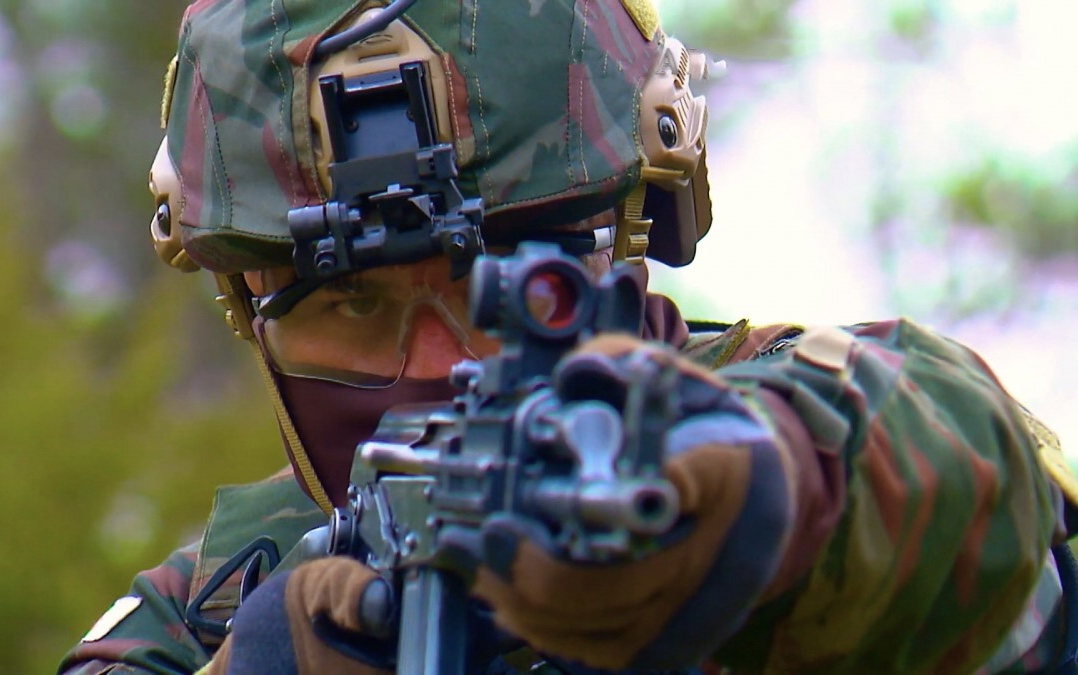
A member of the 104th RMO during a TV report

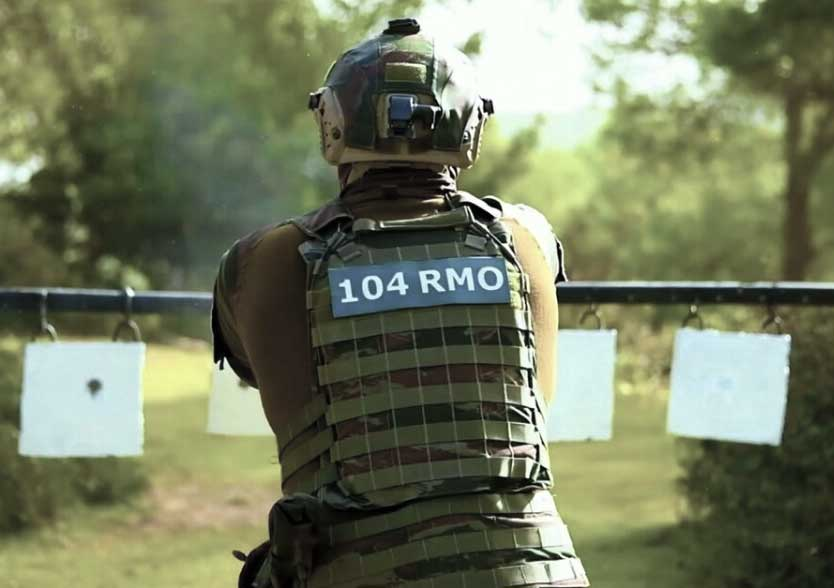
An operator of the 104th RMO during a shooting practice

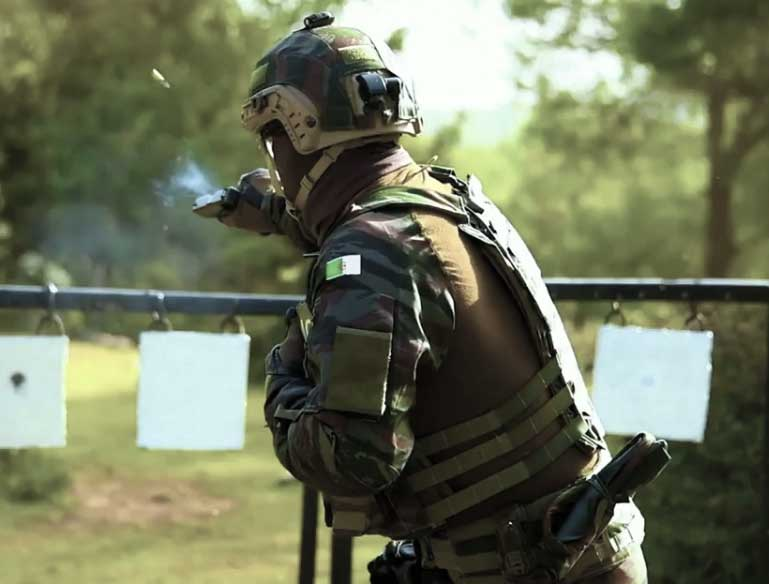
An operator of the 104th RMO during a shooting practice

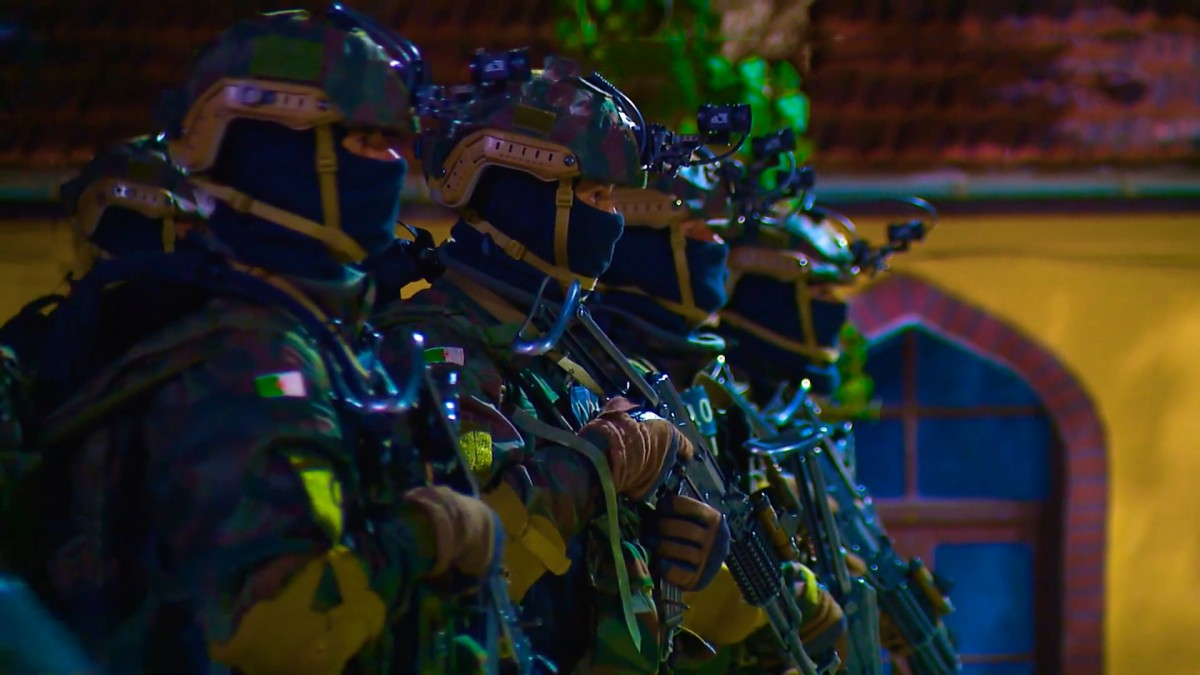
104th Operators with Gladius 2.0 system

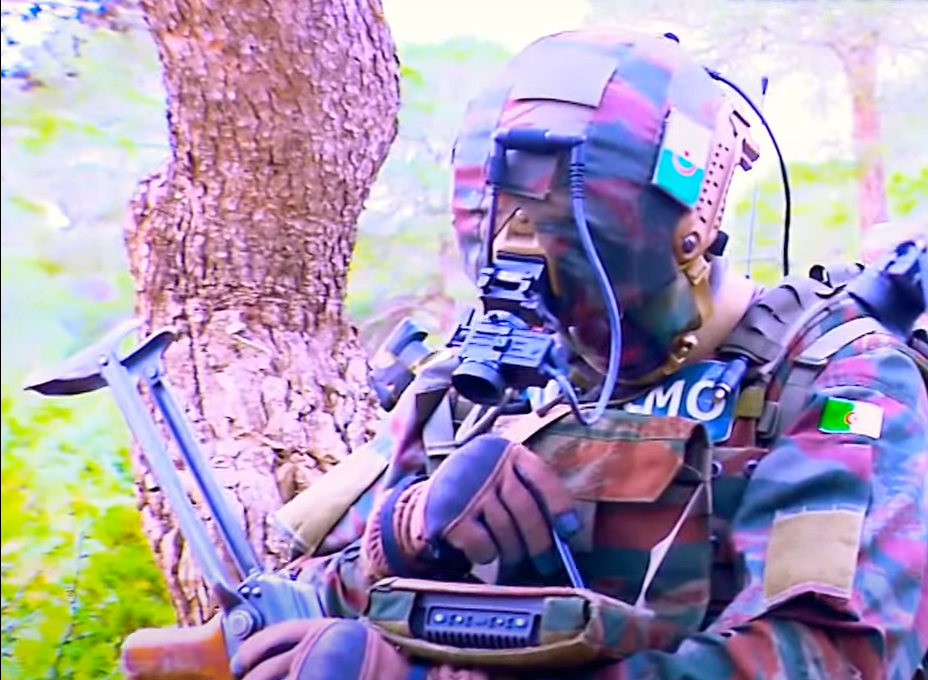
104th RMO operator with gladius 2.0 system

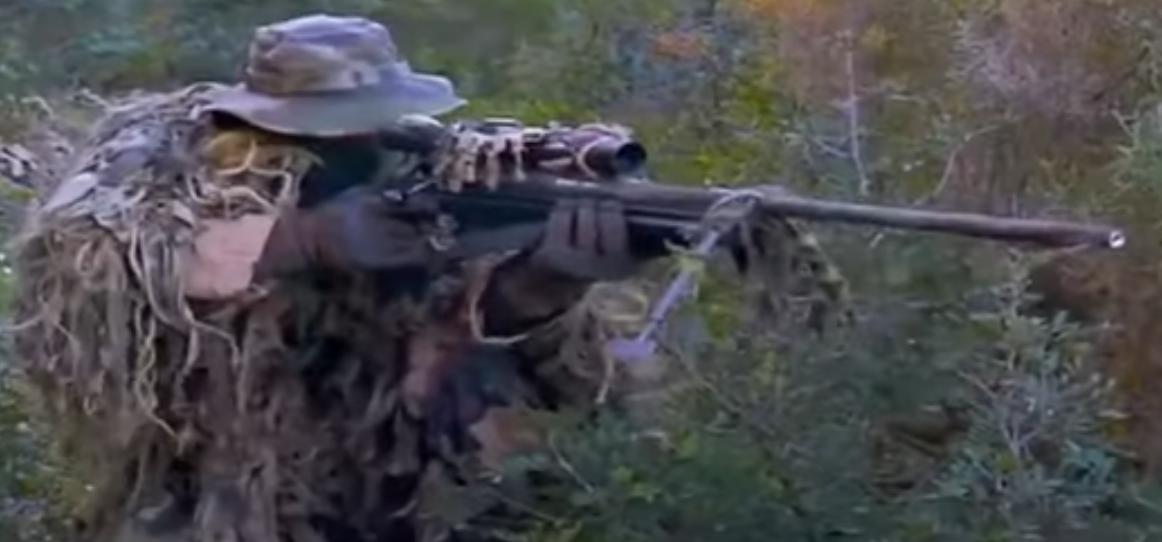
Sniper of the 104th RMO with Sako TRG 22

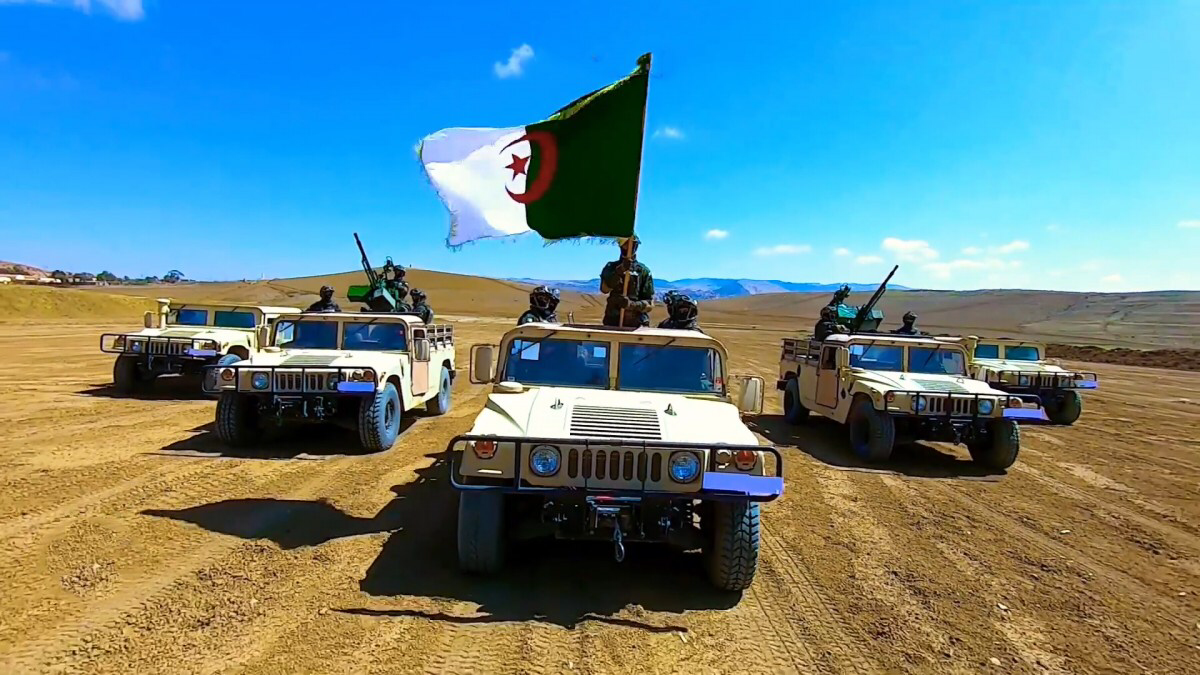
LRRP team during a TV report
