= Military Police (Algeria) =

Military police battalions (BPM) are combat units belonging to the military police of the National People's Army (ANP) in Algeria.

== History ==
The military police have existed since the establishment of the National People's Army (ANP) in 1962, and these units were the basis of the small units in all regiments.

These units at the base were to stand guard at the regimental level, and their main purpose was to hunt down recalcitrant conscripts who deserted or sought to escape from national service, and they also had the task of maintaining law and order within the regiments. However, they do not have judicial power, which is reserved for the national gendarmerie.

From the beginning of the 1990s, the ANP established its first military police battalions, the 85th, the 90th BPM in Beni-Messous, and 93rd. Their men are also trained at the ESTS in Biskra.

The military police units were anti-terrorist units, like the Serbian or former Yugoslavia military police units. These three units were part of the Centre de conduite et de coordination des actions de lutte anti-subversive (CCC/ALAS, or, abbreviated, CLAS) during the 1990s and have participated on a large scale in the fight against Islamic extremists.

Today military police units protect and secure installations and organise and move large combat units.

== Structure ==
Military police battalions are present at each headquarters in the military region. They also provide security at the level of the six military courts and are attached to the Directorate of Military Justice. There are ten military police battalions, or one per military region, but the largest military regions have several battalions.

In addition, the BPMs work jointly with the transport and road control regiments, such as the 571éme Régiment de Contrôle Routier and all regiments of all corps that need an escort for manoeuvres or other activity.

List of Military Police Battalions (Battalions de police militaire, BPM):

- 90th BPM, 1st Military Region (Beni-Messous)
- 91st BPM, 1st Military Region (Blida)
- 92nd BPM, 2nd Military Region (Oran)
- 93rd BPM, 3rd Military Region (Béchar)
- 94th BPM, 4th Military Region (Biskra)
- 95th BPM, 5th Military Region (Constantine)
- 96th BPM, 2nd Military Region (Tlemcen)
- 97th BPM, 4e Region militaire (Ghardaïa) (may be a 'fantome' or 'shadow' unit)
- 98th BPM, 6e Region militaire (Tamanrasset)
- 99th BPM, 1st RM (Chlef)

== Tasks ==
The military police provide security and law enforcement within the regiments of the National People's Army (NPA). Its action is limited only to the army and the military.

The missions of the military police battalions are :

- Security of military infrastructure
- Protection of officers and VIPs
- The management of military prisoners, prisoners of war and deserters
- Traffic control and supply
- Regimental Guard
- The search for individuals
- The hunt and search for deserters
- The fight against terrorism
- Commandos actions (in times of war)

== Weapons and equipment ==
=== Armament ===
The soldiers of the BPMs are equipped with the basic equipment of the Algerian army units, namely:

==== Handgun ====
- Caracal

==== Assault rifle ====
- AKMS
- AKM

==== Machine gun ====
- RPD
- RPK
- PKM

==== Precision rifle ====
- Zatsava M93 Black Arrow
- SVD

==== Shotgun ====
- SR 202P

==== Others ====
- RPG 7
- Tonfa
- Tear gas
- Handcuffs

=== Individual equipment ===
- DPM lattice of the Algerian army
- Algerian army uniforms
- Rangers
- Bullet-proof vest
- Tactical vest
- Armband (or it is written on it "PM" or "Military Police" with the battalion insignia)
- Spectra helmet (white, or with a white coloured military police band)
- Radio
- Walkie-talkie
- Decorative elements (white fodder, white belt, white holster, white overshoes, white sleeves...)
- Grey and red white high-visibility vest (where it is written "Military Police" or "PM")
- Cap
- Black biker outfit with helmet (for bikers)

=== Vehicles ===
- Mercedes-Benz G-Class (in 4x4 and troop carrier configuration and radio)
- Land Rover Defender (in 4X4 and troop transport and radio configuration)
- Mercedes-Benz Sprinter
- SNVI M120, M230 and M260
- Mercedes-Benz Unimog, Zetros and Actros
- BMW R 1150 R
