= Special Troops Training Center =

Military school in Algeria

The Special Troops Training Center (CFTS) is a specialized military school of the Algerian Land Forces.

== History ==
The Special Troops Training Center (CFTS), is located in the town of Biskra, 405 km south-east of Algiers.

Originally the CFTS was created under the supervision of the Special Troops Superior School (ESTS), however it became completely autonomous from January 1994.

The ESTS is in charge of training officers and non-commissioned officers, while the CFTS is responsible for training men of the rank of paratroopers of the Algerian army.

Also nearby are the 1st combat helicopter regiment, the 32nd Algerian Air Force Transport Squadron and the 12th parachute commando regiment (12th RPC).

== Training ==
The FSTC offers training courses in order to obtain the following certificates :

- The Professional Military Certificate 1st Degree (CMP1) for corporal students
- The Certificate of Application (CA) for djounouds (soldiers)
- The duration of training for CMP 1 is 6 months and is divided into 2 parts:

First phase: basic training (common core) of 2 months duration, the second phase: 4-month specialty training course

- While the duration of training for the Board of Directors is 5 months and also takes place in 2 phases:

First phase: basic training (core curriculum) of 2 months. the second phase: specialization training taking place in three 3 months. This phase completes the first one. It is devoted to the aptitudes enabling the djoundi (soldier) to accomplish the elementary acts of his speciality.

This school thus trains the future soldiers and corporals of the paratroopers commandos of the Algerian army.

== Means of the school ==
The school has at its disposal:

Classrooms equipped with pedagogical means

Instructional sketches and sectional material of various rifles, ammunition, grenades and instructional ammunition

Various courses (combat, obstacle course, nautical, stress, psychological...)

Several sports halls and multisports halls

Replica of an aircraft for parachute jumping training

Several exercise fields for practical combat training...

Several firing ranges

Transport vehicles

Parachute jump simulator
