= Special Troops Superior School =

- Founded: 1963
- Service branches: Algerian Land Forces
- Headquarters: Biskra
- Website: https://www.mdn.dz/site_cft/sommaire/recrutement%20et%20formation/ests_an.php

Personnel
- Active personnel: 250

The Special Troops Superior School (ESTS; Arabic: المدرسة العليا للقوات الخاصة) is the school for airborne and specialized troops of the Algerian army based in Biskra.

== History ==
The Special Troops Superior School is a military school belonging to the Algerian Land Forces. It was created from the Commandos Training Centre (CIC) created in 1963 in Skikda. After that, in 1971, this centre was transferred to Biskra at the gateway to the desert to become the Airborne Troops Training Centre (CFTA). Only specialised units and parachutists were trained there.

In 1975, as part of the development of the National People's Army, the centre became the Airborne Troop School (ATS).

In 1991, as part of the restructuring of the National People's Army, the school was renamed the School for the Application of Special Troops (EATS).

Since 2017, the school has been known as the Higher School for Special Troops (ESTS).

Since 1991, the ESTS has trained all parachutists and specialised units of the Algerian army, but it also trains soldiers of foreign armies.

== Organization ==
the ESTS has several instruction companies, as well as educational offices (sports office, instruction office...)

== Missions ==
As part of the army's specialized training missions, the schools are responsible for :

- To provide specialized training for special troops to officers and non-commissioned officers of the paratroopers
- To follow training courses at unit level, provided by instructors from the school, such as commando training courses, warfare, survival...
- To provide refresher and specialized training courses for officers and NCOs in active service.
- To provide weapons application courses to active officers and non-commissioned officers on completion of their common core training.
- The training of parachute and commando instructors - The organization of parachute jumping cycles for the officer cadets of the Cherchell Military Academy
- The formation of the national team of sport parachuting
- The training of operational challengers and paratroopers and commandos of the Algerian army

Parallel to this school is the Special Troops Training Center (CFTS), which trains non-commissioned men and corporals. This training centre is located close to the ESTS.

In addition, the ESTS also works closely with the Commando and Parachute Training School (EFCIP) in Boghar, as well as with other military schools and training centres of the Algerian army.

== Training ==
The training of ESTS students is based on :

- Military sport (obstacle course, stress management course...)
- Mastery of the different armaments of the Algerian army and foreign armies.
- Specialized military training for parachute units and others.
- Military parachuting
- Refresher courses and retraining
- Specialized training and application courses such as commando, parachutist...
- The professional military certificate of 2nd degree
- The first degree professional military certificate
- Military Occupational Certificate No. 2
- The martial arts of the Algerian army (Kuk-sool-won, ju-jitsu, karate, judo...)
- The learning of foreign languages.
- The school also trains soldiers, gendarmes, firemen ... both Algerian and foreigners.
- The training lasts 6 months and is done in two phases:
- Basic training lasting two months;
- Specialized training on the trainees' speciality up to the level of team leader lasting four months.

The total duration of the specialized training (for special forces operators) is 18 months.

== Structures ==
The school and the Special Troop Training Center have important educational facilities such as computer-assisted classrooms, a language lab, survival, topography, tactics study rooms, and exercise courses for tests such as psychological, nautical, obstacle and tactical firing ranges. The school and the Special Troop Training Centre also have a number of other facilities.

In addition, the school also has several fields and training camps, as well as several shooting ranges of various distances, a semi-Olympic swimming pool, and sports halls.

The school also has a hotel, a restaurant, a hostel for each category of trainees (non-commissioned officers, NCOs, officers), a cinema, a museum and a library.
