= 1st Military Region (Algeria) =

Military region of the Algerian army

The 1st Military Region is a military region of the People's National Army of Algeria. It has its headquarters at Blida, and includes the capital of Algiers

Much of the internal disorder and violence associated with economic distress and the Islamist movement of the 1980s occurred in this Military Region, as well as the 5th Military Region (Constantine). Army units were strengthened in and near the cities where attacks against the government and security forces have occurred.

Regional commanders were originally all colonels, and Said Abid probably served in this rank from 1964 when he took over the region. He appeared to be holding command during the 1965 Algerian coup d'état. Said Bey was chosen by Lt. Gen Mohamed Lamari to be the commander of the 1st Military Region in 1994, but Boughaba Rabah replaced him in 1997 after multiple massacres occurred in Blida. The commander of the 1st Military Region (Mohamed Djenouhat) (as well as the commander of the 5th Military Region) were both promoted to major general in 1992. After a major reshuffle of positions in the guards, Brahim Fodhil Chérif was appointed in 2000 as head of the military region, replacing Major General Boughaba Rabah. Fodhil Cherif's commanded the "Special Forces" (ninjas) to go against the Islamic rebellion.

The higher military school of the Territorial Air Defence Forces (école supérieure de la défense aérienne du territoire) is located at Reghaïa in the 1st Military Region. It provides engineering training.

It is reported that the 1st Military Region contains the 90th, 91st, and 99th Battalions of the Military Police.

== Commanders, Military Region I ==
- Colonel Mohamed Abdelghani (1962-1964)
- Colonel Saïd Abid (1964-1967)
- Colonel Abdallah Belhouchet (1967-1979)
- Général Mohamed Attailia (1979-1988)
- Mohamed Djenouhat (promoted to major general c.1992)
- Said Bey (1994-1997)
- Boughaba Rabah (1997-?)
- Général major Rabah Boughaba (-2000)
- Général major Fodil Cherif Brahim (2000-2004)
- Général major Lahbib Chentouf (2004-2018)
- Général major Ali Sidane (depuis 2018)
