= Algerian Land Forces =

Army of Algeria

- القوات البرية الجزائرية (Arabic)
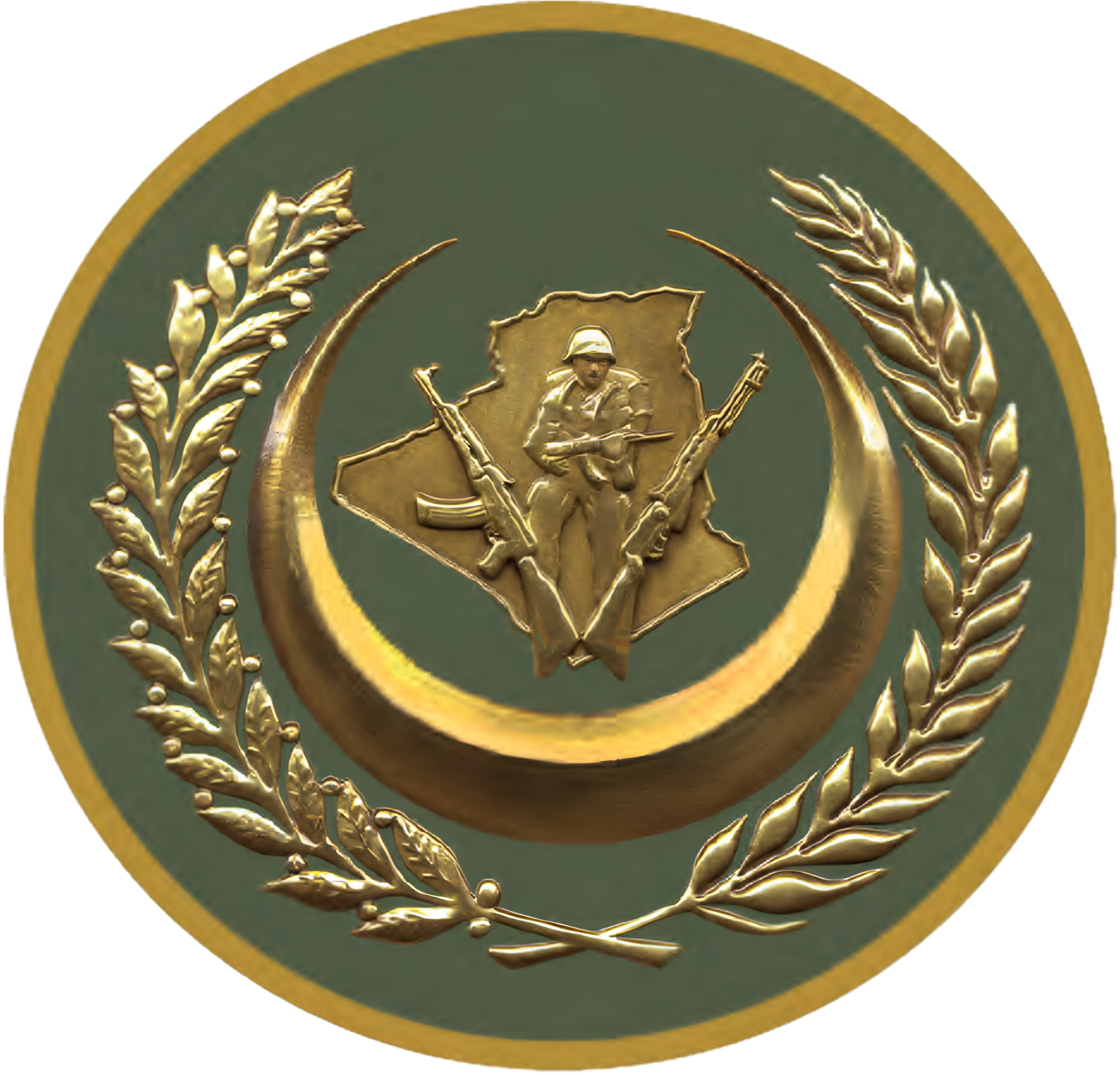
- Founded: 1962 (Formerly the National Liberation Army)
- Country: Algeria
- Branch: Army
- Role: Land warfare
- Size: 137,000/220,000
- Part of: Algerian People's National Army
- Headquarters: Algiers
- Website: Official website

Commanders
- Chief of Staff: Saïd Chengriha
- Commander, Land Forces: Army corps general Mustafa Smaïli

The Algerian Land Forces (Arabic: القوات البرية الجزائرية, lit. 'Algerian Land Forces', French: Forces Terrestres Algériennes) are the land forces of the Algerian People's National Army. The forces' equipment is mostly supplied by Russia and China.

The forces include two armoured and two mechanised divisions, one of which is the 8th Armoured Division based at Ras El Ma, 90 kilometres from Sidi Bel Abbes, in the 2nd Military Region. The division was formed from the 8th Armoured Brigade after 1988 (the 8th Armoured Brigade seems to have been formed in 1976). The other armoured division was named by IISS 2017 as the 1st. Another is the 40th Mechanised Infantry Division apparently based in the 3rd Military Region. The mission of the 40th Division is usually the protection of the Algerian-Moroccan frontier. The IISS Military Balance 2013 named the other mechanised division as the 12th. There may be a single independent armoured brigade, the 41st Armoured Brigade in the In Amenas area, and the IISS said in 2020 that the 38th Motorised Brigade was located at Tindouf.

There have also been French reports of an airborne division formed in the early 1990s. This formation, the 17th Parachute Division, with five airborne regiments, seemingly similar to the French reporting, was listed in the IISS Military Balance for 2001-02 and 2006, but not listed in the 2007 edition. It was listed with four regiments and a special forces regiment in the 2017 edition (p. 368).

== Creation and development ==
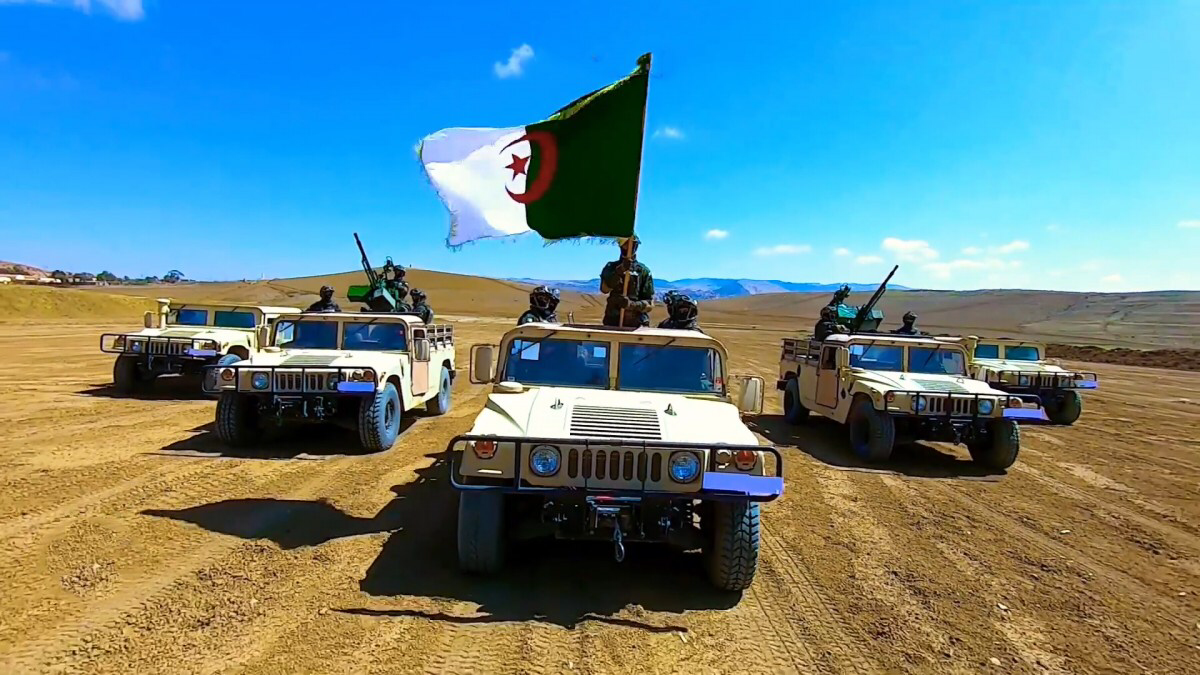
Algerian soldiers mounted on some Humveess

After the end of the liberation war in June 1962, the first objective was to establish a logistics organization to meet the needs of the army - a structure to feed, clothe, care for and train. The directorates of Stewardship, Hardware, Engineering and Health, Transport and Supply were the first to emerge. These directorates, which came quickly join those of the staff of the Air Force, Navy and Education, at the Ministry, would form the backbone of the National People's Army. The bases of the general structure of the army were consolidated with the creation of the main directions, the establishment of an effective organization, the opening of schools and instruction centers and sending abroad trainees for different weapons and services.

Efforts to develop and modernize the ANP continued throughout the 1970s and 80s, at the organizational level with the formation of battalions and brigades. During the eighties, the army experienced considerable growth. Thus, in 1986, a restructuring began, based primarily on the implementation of large units combining firepower and gradual movement, i.e. combat divisions, equipped with sophisticated weapons systems and other equipment necessary for the use and maintenance of these systems. This modernization was not just about the hardware, but included all organizational areas and combat. Thus was created the General Inspection of the PNA.

The Algerian military provided young men, from disadvantaged backgrounds, the opportunity to move up in society. This opportunity played a strong role in southeast Algeria, the Aures and Nemencha mountains, where the Shawiyya Berbers lived.

== Military regions ==
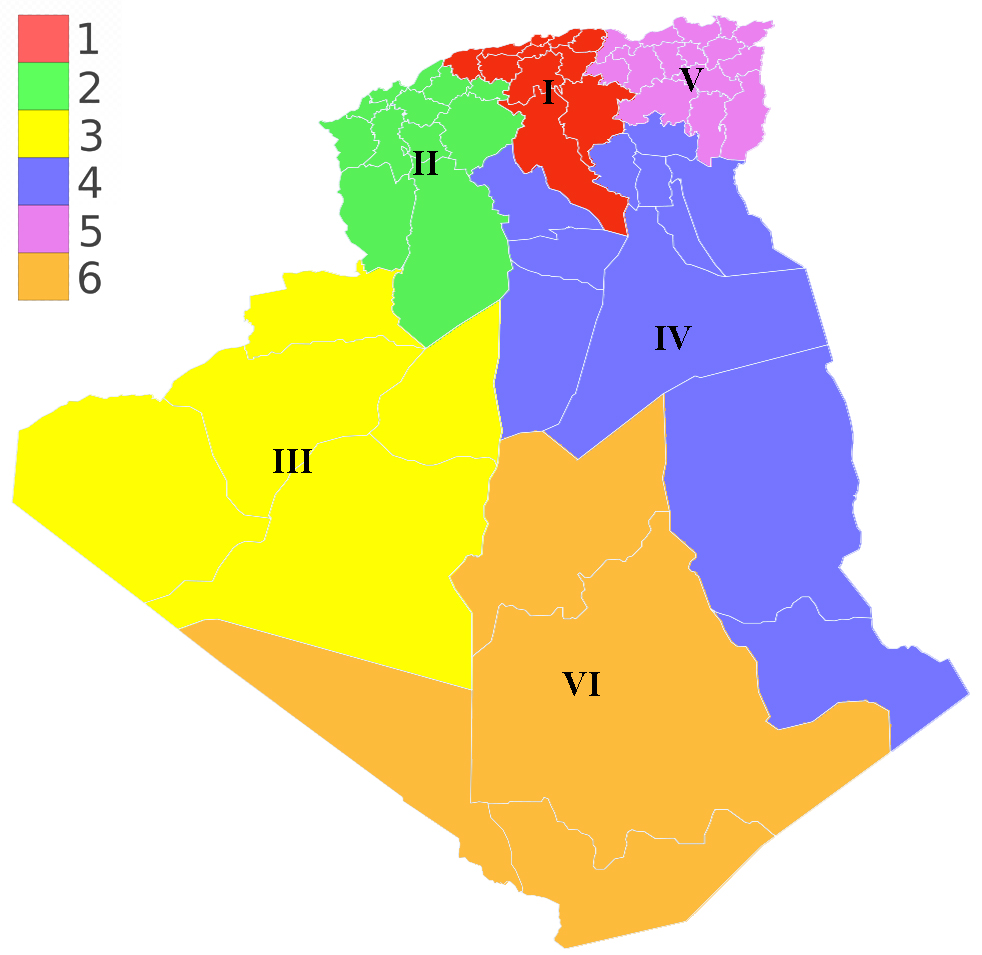
Algerian military regions

Algeria is divided into six numbered military regions, each with headquarters located in a principal city or town. This system of territorial organization, adopted shortly after independence, grew out of the wartime wilaya structure and the postwar necessity of subduing antigovernment insurgencies that were based in the various regions. Regional commanders control and administer bases, logistics, and housing, as well as conscript training. Commanders of army divisions and brigades, air force installations, and naval forces report directly to the Ministry of National Defense and service chiefs of staff on operational matters.

During the 1980s, most of the army's combat units were concentrated in the 2nd Military Region (Oran) and to a lesser extent in the 3rd Military Region (Béchar). Chadli Bendjedid became head of the 2nd Military Region in 1964. Adjacent to Morocco, the 3rd Military Region straddles the main access routes from that country. It is also near the troubled Western Sahara, embracing territory previously claimed by Morocco. Much of the internal disorder and violence associated with economic distress and the Islamist movement has occurred in the 1st Military Region (Blida), which includes the capital of Algiers, and the 5th Military Region (Constantine). Army units have been strengthened in and near the cities where attacks against the government and security forces have occurred. Although regional commanders were originally all colonels, the commanders of the 1st Military Region (Mohamed Djenouhat) and the 5th Military Region (Abdelhamid Djouadi) were both promoted to major general in 1992. The two southeastern regions — the 4th Military Region (Ouargla) and 6th Military Region (Tamanrasset) — were sparsely populated tracts of desert where a limited number of combat troops carried out patrols and occupied small outposts. The Ouargla region assumed a measure of strategic importance after relations with Libya soured, but the military's main activities there and in the 6th Military Region are the construction and planting projects undertaken by conscript forces. The 6th Military Region was created in 1975 to cover the south. The formation of a seventh region - at Illizi in the south - was proposed in 2013.

On February 24, 2000, there was a large changeover of military region commanders: four of the six were changed. From this reshuffling, the previous French Army officers took power in the Algerian Armed Forces and the shift in power correlated with the change of a national service and a shift to greater professionalisation of the ANP.

President Bouteflika, as Minister of Defence, nominated new commanders for military regions in August 2004. In 2010 there were a further series of changes. Bouteflika changed the commanders of three military regions, according to the presidential decrees published Wednesday 25 August in the Algerian Journal officiel (Official Journal). Général Mohand-Ameziane Si-Mohand was nominated to head the 3rd Military Region, Général Hassen Alaimia took command of the 4th Military Region and the 5th Military Region (Algeria) was placed under the command of Général Saïd Ziad. These nominations took effect from 1 August, according to the same decrees. President Bouteflika also named new military region deputy commanders.

In 2016-17 Laurent Touchard said the land forces were 147,000 strong, with the Republican Guard (brigade, of nine regiments, two ceremonial); the 9th Commando Group; the 25th Special Forces Regiment; the 17th Parachute Division; two armoured divisions (1st, 8th); an armoured brigade, two mechanised infantry divisions, three mechanised and two motorised brigades, some 20ish independent infantry battalions, two artillery, seven anti-aircraft, and four engineer battalions (Touchard 2017, 17-18). Touchard lists three Military Police battalions including the 90eme Bataillon de police militaire (seemingly located at Béni Messous, in the suburbs of Algiers) and the 95eme Bataillon de police militaire (Constantine), but other sources give up to ten, with at least one per military region.

== Equipment ==
The inventory of the Algerian Land Forces mainly includes equipment from the Soviet Union and its successor Russia, and to a lower degree from China and Germany including other European Union countries.

== Ranks ==
=== Commissioned officer ranks ===
The rank insignia of commissioned officers.

Rank group	General / flag officers				Senior officers			Junior officers
Algerian Land Forces
Algerian Land Forces	فريق أول; Farīq 'awwal	فريق; Farīq	لواء; Liwāʾ	عميد 'Amīd	عقيد 'Aqīd	مقدم; Muqaddam	رائد; Rā'id	نقيب; Naqīb	ملازم أول; Mulāzim 'awwal	ملازم; Mulāzim
Algerian Land Forces	Général d'armée	Général de corps d'armée	Général major	Général	Colonel	Lieutenant-colonel	Commandant	Capitaine	Lieutenant	Sous-lieutenant

=== Other ranks ===
The rank insignia of non-commissioned officers and enlisted personnel.

Rank group	Senior NCOs				Junior NCOs		Enlisted
Algerian Land Forces							No insignia
Algerian Land Forces	مساعد أول; Mosa'id awwal	مساعد; Mosa'id	رقيب أول; Raqib awwal	رقيب; Raqib	عريف أول; Earif 'awal	عريف; Earif	جندي; Jundiun
Algerian Land Forces	Adjudant-chef	Adjudant	Sergent-chef	Sergent	Caporal-chef	Caporal	Djoundi

== See also ==
- List of equipment of the Algerian Land Forces
- fr:Région militaire (Algérie)

== Bibliography ==
- International Institute for Strategic Studies (14 February 2020). The Military Balance 2020. London: Routledge. ISBN 978-0-367-46639-8.
- Carlos Echeverría Jesús (1 April 2004). "THE ALGERIAN ARMED FORCES: NATIONAL AND INTERNATIONAL CHALLENGES (Working Paper Nº 8/2004)" (PDF).
