= 2nd Military Region (Algeria) =

The 2nd Military Region is a military region of the Algerian People's National Armed Forces. Its headquarters is at Oran.

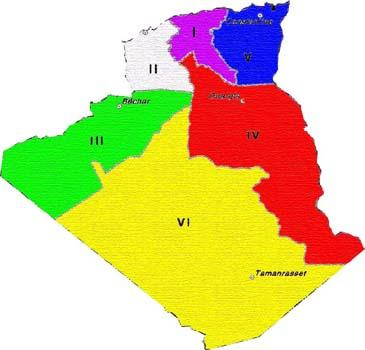
Algerian military regions in 1993.

Up until the early 1990s, most of the field units of the armed forces were stationed in the 2nd and the 3rd Military Regions. The 8th Armoured Division is based at Ras El Ma, 90 kilometres from Sidi Bel Abbes, in the 2nd Military Region.

Previous commanders have included Chadli Bendjedid (1964–78) and Kamal Abderrahim. While commanding the region, Benjedid supervised the withdrawal of French forces from Mers el Kebir in accordance with the Evian Accords.
