= 3rd Military Region (Algeria) =

The 3rd Military Region is a military region of the Algerian People's National Armed Forces. It has its headquarters at Béchar.

The military region system, adopted shortly after independence, grew out of the Algerian War wilaya structure and the need to fight regional insurgencies. Regional commanders control and administer bases, logistics, and housing, as well as conscript training. Commanders of army divisions and brigades, air force installations, and naval forces report directly to the Ministry of National Defense and service chiefs of staff on operational matters.

During the 1980s, many of the army's combat units were concentrated in the 2nd Military Region (Oran) and to a lesser extent in the 3rd Military Region (Béchar). Adjacent to Morocco, the 3rd Military Region straddles the main access routes from that country. It also borders the Western Sahara, embracing territory previously claimed by Morocco.

The International Institute for Strategic Studies in the Military Balance 2020 wrote that the 40th Mechanised Division was located at Béchar and the 38th Motorised Brigade at Tindouf. The 93rd Military Police Battalion is also separately reported to be based at Bechar.

== Regional commanders ==
Mohamed Zerguini took up command of the region in 1969.

- Commandant Soufi Salah (-)
- Colonel Liamine Zéroual (1984-1987)
- Colonel Mohamed Betchine (1987-1987) (see fr:Mohamed Betchine)
- Général Ahmed Gaïd Salah (-1992)
- Général major Zoubir Ghedaidia (-2000)
- Général major Ahcene Tafer (2000-2004)
- Général major Saïd Chengriha (2004-2018)
- Général major Mostefa Smaali (since 2018)
