= Organisation of Young Free Algerians =

The Organization of Young Free Algerians (OJAL, French: Organisation des jeunes Algériens libres) was a pro-government armed group that claimed credit for various attacks against civilians who sympathised with the Islamists during the Algerian Civil War. It was active mainly in 1994 and 1995. However, some claims and speculations allege that it was a front organizations under which elements of the DRS, the Algerian security services, operated. OJAL never existed as an independent organisation.

== Acts for which OJAL took credit ==
- The abduction (on 26 November 1993) and killing of Mohamed Bouslimani, president of the Islamic charity El Irshad wa el Islah and founding member of HMS. This abduction was also claimed by the GIA.
- The kidnapping and torture of Islamic Salvation Front (FIS - then dissolved) founding member and mathematician Mohamed Tedjini Boudjelkha in November 1993; he was released after 5 days.
- The threat in February 1994 that "If a woman is attacked for not wearing a chador, OJAL will take vengeance by purely and simply liquidating 20 women wearing a hijab."

== Testimony from a former DRS agent ==
According to Aggoun and Rivoire (2004), OJAL was a name that was made up by a group within the DRS, the Algerian security service:

"In September 2001, the ex-adjudant Abdelkader Tigha, sub-officer of the DRS who had deserted at the end of 1999, revealed that the acronym OJAL had been invented by the right-hand man of the CTRI (Centre Territorial de Recherche et d'Investigation / Territorial Research and Investigation Centre) of Blida, Captain Abdelhafid Allouache ..., and that it was subsequently used by other departments of the DRS as a cover in order to murder enemies with impunity."

Abdelkader Tigha, DRS head of a brigade at the CTRI of Blida, first military region, was charged with getting information on the Armed Islamic Groups (GIA) and with infiltrating them. According to Tigha, who has requested the status of political refugee:

"Before the deterioration of the state of security in Blida (daily bombings, attacks on barracks), my service had received the order [in 1993], directly from General Lamari Smain [head of counter-espionage in the DRS, itself directed by General Mohamed Médiène ], to limit translations before a tribunal, this means starting to execute arrested people in order to diminish the GIA's recruiting and scare the civilian population..."

Police forces were put in 1993 under the authority of the CTRI security services. "Nothing changed from 1993 to 1997" continued Tigha, executions followed arrests. According to Tigha, the police and military were “well aware of what was going on” and their job was to “collect and bury the corpses," on which the acronym OJAL was written. The organization had also posted false flyers to accredit its existence, which was allegedly only a useful cover to dissimulate the acts committed by the counter-insurgency.

The heads of the DRS, Mohamed Médiène and Lamari Smain, decided to create groups of "Patriots" which they armed in order to fight the Islamists. Head of the Armed Forces, Mohamed Lamari (no family ties with Lamari Smain), decided in 1997 to change their names to GLD (Groupe de Légitime Défense, Legitime Defense Groups), allegedly because of fears of prosecution by international courts. According to Tigha, these armed civilians were ordered to kill whole families of targeted Islamists, creating a cycle of vengeance, and to protect wealthy families and homes. They were under complete protection of the security forces. Hence, those responsible for the murder of GIA's emir Antar Zouabri's family were protected by the DRS according to Tigha's testimony.

== Testimony from Mohamed Samraoui ==
Former colonel Mohamed Samraoui claimed in a 2003 book that the Algerian secret service had sponsored false flag attacks attributed to the Islamists but organized by them. He described a 1995 scene with Colonel Mohamed Benabdallah, officer of the Special Forces of the CCLAS (Centre de Commandement de la Lutte Antisubversive / Centre Command of the Antisubversive Fight.): "Colonel Mohamed Benabdallah would be proud in my presence for being one of the men in charge of OJAL, death squadron of the DRS created under General Toufik." According to Samraoui, the OJAL became active in November 1993, but its peak activity was during March and April 1994, when it claimed credit for tens of assassinations. "One can say that the real chief of the OJAL was General Mohamed Lamari, since he was the boss of the CC/ALAS, from which depended the paratroopers-commandos and the DRS elements responsibles of these crimes. Colonel Benabdallah indicated to me that if Islamists had committed numerous assassinations of political personalities, the Army had also engaged in this itself: it "struck back against all journalists, scientists or officials who gave support to the Fundamentalist cause."

== Aggoun and Rivoire (2004) ==
Aggoun and Rivoire continue:

According to the media, these groups are made up of young citizens who feel the need to eradicate all forms of Islam from Algeria. To the Algerians who lived through the Independence War, the mysterious acronym OJAL reminds them of the Organization of the French Algerian Resistance (ORAF), a group of counter-terrorists created in December 1956 by the DST (Direction de la Surveillance du Territoire / Territorial Surveillance Directorate) whose mission was to carry out terrorist attacks with the aim of quashing any hopes of political compromise. Since its creation, the OJAL appears to work in the same way as the ORAF, the Triple A or Mano Negra – the South American equivalents which operated during the 1970s.

== Amnesty International ==
According to the evidence collected by Amnesty International, the OJAL acted “as one with the security forces” and a number of people killed by these same security forces had “received death threats some time beforehand from OJAL”

== See also ==
- Algeria
- Politics of Algeria
- Islamic Salvation Front
- Category:Massacres in the Algerian Civil War
- Category:Politics of Algeria

== Bibliography ==
- Lounis Aggoun and Jean-Baptiste Rivoire (2004). Françalgérie", crimes et mensonges d'Etats, [Franco-Algeria, Crimes and Lies of the States]. Editions La Découverte. ISBN 2-7071-4747-8.

Has a section called "The Organisation of Young Free Algerians, death squadron of the DRS", an excerpt available at . DRS stands for Département du Renseignement et de la Sécurité, the Algerian secret service.

- Mohamed Samraoui (2003). Chronique des années de sang [Chronicle of the years of blood]. Denoël. ISBN 2-207-25489-5.
