= Military ranks of Algeria =

The military ranks of Algeria are the military insignia used by the Algerian People's National Army. Being a former colony of France, Algeria shares a similar rank structure to that of France.

== Commissioned officer ranks ==
The rank insignia of commissioned officers.

| Rank group | General / flag officers | | | | Senior officers | | | Junior officers |
|---|---|---|---|---|---|---|---|---|---|---|
| Algerian Land Forces |
| Algerian Land Forces | فريق أول; Farīq 'awwal | فريق; Farīq | لواء; Liwāʾ | عميد 'Amīd | عقيد 'Aqīd | مقدم; Muqaddam | رائد; Rā'id | نقيب; Naqīb | ملازم أول; Mulāzim 'awwal | ملازم; Mulāzim |
| Algerian Land Forces | Général d'armée | Général de corps d'armée | Général de division | Général | Colonel | Lieutenant-colonel | Commandant | Capitaine | Lieutenant | Sous-lieutenant |
| Algerian National Navy |
| Algerian National Navy | فريق أول; Fariq 'awal | فريق; Fariq | لواء; Liwa | عميد; Amid | عقيد; Aqid | مقدم; Muqaddam | رائد; Ra'id | نقيب; Naqib | ملازم أول; Mulazim awwal | ملازم; Mulazim |
| Algerian National Navy | Général d'armée | Général de corps d'armée | Général de division | Général | Colonel | Lieutenant-colonel | Commandant | Capitaine | Lieutenant | Sous-lieutenant |
| Algerian Air Force |
| Algerian Air Force | فريق أول; Fariq 'awal | فريق; Fariq | لواء; Liwa | عميد; Amid | عقيد; Aqid | مقدم; Muqaddam | رائد; Ra'id | نقيب; Naqib | ملازم أول; Mulazim awwal | ملازم; Mulazim |
| Algerian Air Force | Général d'armée | Général de corps d'armée | Général de division | Général | Colonel | Lieutenant-colonel | Commandant | Capitaine | Lieutenant | Sous-lieutenant |
| Algerian Territorial Air Defence Forces |
| Algerian Territorial Air Defence Forces | | | لواء; Liwa | عميد; Amid | عقيد; Aqid | مقدم; Muqaddam | رائد; Ra'id | نقيب; Naqib | ملازم أول; Mulazim awwal | ملازم; Mulazim |
| Algerian Territorial Air Defence Forces | | | Général de division | Général | Colonel | Lieutenant-colonel | Commandant | Capitaine | Lieutenant | Sous-lieutenant |
| Algerian National Gendarmerie |
| Algerian National Gendarmerie | | | لواء; Liwāʾ | عميد 'Amīd | عقيد 'Aqīd | مقدم; Muqaddam | رائد; Rā'id | نقيب; Naqīb | ملازم أول; Mulāzim 'awwal | ملازم; Mulāzim |
| Algerian National Gendarmerie | | | Général de division | Général | Colonel | Lieutenant-colonel | Commandant | Capitaine | Lieutenant | Sous-lieutenant |
| Algerian Republican Guard |
| Algerian Republican Guard | | | لواء; Liwāʾ | عميد 'Amīd | عقيد 'Aqīd | مقدم; Muqaddam | رائد; Rā'id | نقيب; Naqīb | ملازم أول; Mulāzim 'awwal | ملازم; Mulāzim |
| Algerian Republican Guard | | | Général de division | Général | Colonel | Lieutenant-colonel | Commandant | Capitaine | Lieutenant | Sous-lieutenant |
| Rank group | General / flag officers | | | | Senior officers | | | Junior officers |

=== Student officer ranks ===
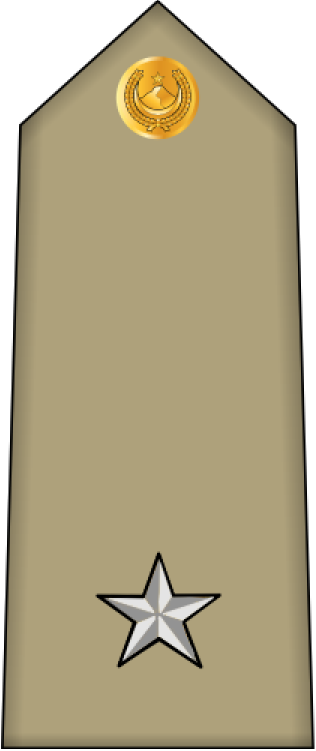
| Rank group | Student officer |
|---|---|
| Algerian Land Forces |
| Algerian Land Forces | مرشح; Muraššaḥ |
| Algerian Land Forces | Aspirant |

== Other ranks ==
The rank insignia of non-commissioned officers and enlisted personnel.

| Rank group | Senior NCOs | | | | Junior NCOs | | Enlisted |
|---|---|---|---|---|---|---|---|
| Algerian Land Forces | | | | | | | No insignia |
| Algerian Land Forces | مساعد أول; Mosa'id awwal | مساعد; Mosa'id | رقيب أول; Raqib awwal | رقيب; Raqib | عريف أول; Earif 'awal | عريف; Earif | جندي; Jundiun |
| Algerian Land Forces | Adjudant-chef | Adjudant | Sergent-chef | Sergent | Caporal-chef | Caporal | Djoundi |
| Algerian National Navy | | | | | | | No insignia |
| Algerian National Navy | مساعد أول; Mosa'id awwal | مساعد; Mosa'id | رقيب أول; Raqib awwal | رقيب; Raqib | عريف أول; Earif 'awal | عريف; Earif | جندي; Jundiun |
| Algerian National Navy | Adjudant chef | Adjudant | Sergent chef | Sergent | Caporal chef | Caporal | Djoundi |
| Algerian Air Force | | | | | | | No insignia |
| Algerian Air Force | مساعد أول; Mosa'id awwal | مساعد; Mosa'id | رقيب أول; Raqib awwal | رقيب; Raqib | عريف أول; Earif 'awal | عريف; Earif | جندي; Jundiun |
| Algerian Air Force | Adjudant chef | Adjudant | Sergent chef | Sergent | Caporal chef | Caporal | Djoundi |
| Algerian Territorial Air Defence Forces | | | | | | | No insignia |
| Algerian Territorial Air Defence Forces | مساعد أول; Mosa'id awwal | مساعد; Mosa'id | رقيب أول; Raqib awwal | رقيب; Raqib | عريف أول; Earif 'awal | عريف; Earif | جندي; Jundiun |
| Algerian Territorial Air Defence Forces | Adjudant chef | Adjudant | Sergent chef | Sergent | Caporal chef | Caporal | Djoundi |
| Rank group | Senior NCOs | | | | Junior NCOs | | Enlisted |

== See also ==
- Algerian People's National Armed Forces
- List of wars involving Algeria
