= Abdelmalek Guenaizia =

Algerian politician and officer (1936–2019)

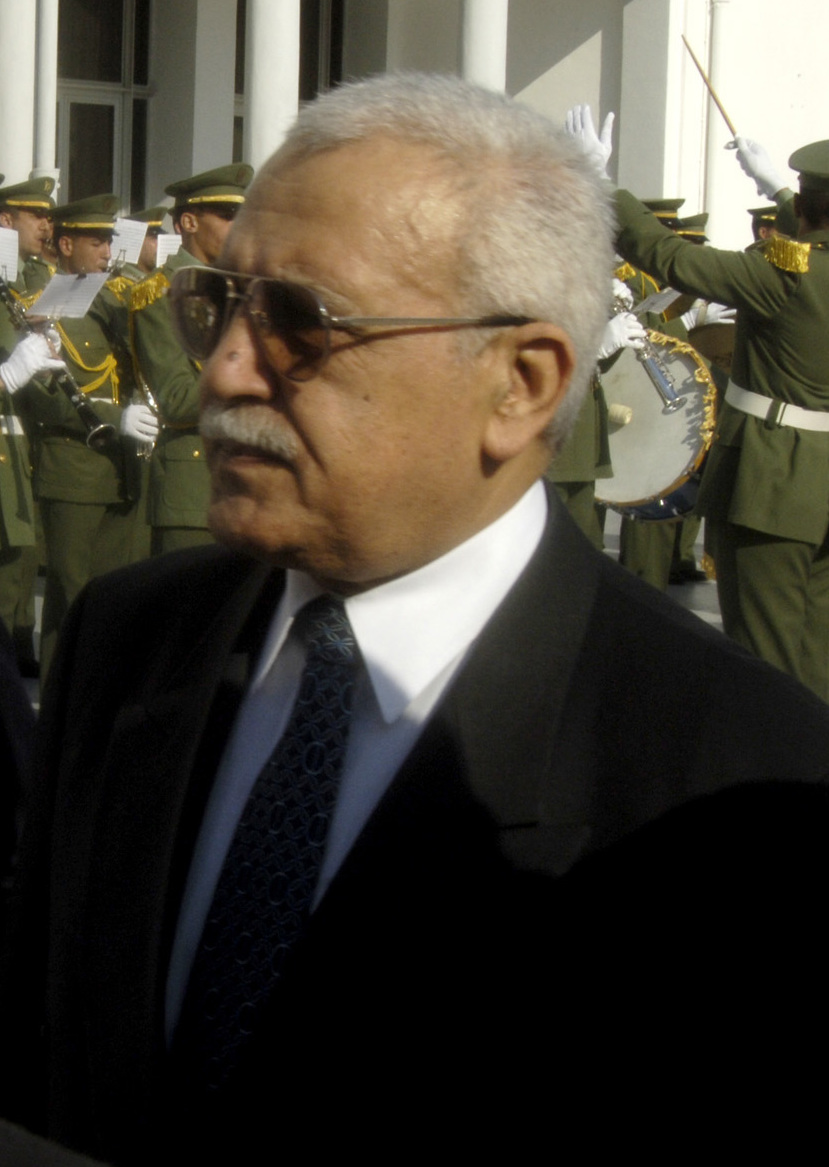

Delegate Minister to the Minister of National Defense
- In office May 1, 2005 – September 12, 2013
- Succeeded by: Ahmed Gaid Salah

Chief of Staff of the People's National Army
- In office July 25, 1990 – July 10, 1993
- Preceded by: Khaled Nezzar
- Succeeded by: Mohamed Lamari

Personal details
- Born: عبد المالك قنايزية; November 20, 1936 Souk Ahras, French Algeria (now Algeria)
- Died: February 4, 2019 (82 years old) Geneva, Switzerland

Military service
- Allegiance: French Army; National Liberation Front; Algeria
- Commands: Commander of the Air Force; Chief of Staff
- Battles/wars: Algerian War; Yom Kippur War; Algerian Civil War

Abdelmalek Guenaïzia was a major general and Algerian politician who served as Chief of Staff of the People's National Army from 1990 to 1993 and Delegate Minister to the Minister of Defense from 2005 to 2013.

== Biography ==
Guenaizia was born on November 20, 1936, in Souk Ahras, then French Algeria. He deserted from the French army, joining the FLN in April 1958 at the age of 22. In the FLN, he served as instructor officer, and later a commander of command units.

After Algerian independence, and following training in the US and USSR, Guenaizia assumed the functions of Chief of Staff of military regions. He also assumed duties of armored brigade commander, deputy regional military commander, and central logistics director. He then was promoted to military equipment and manufacturing. In 1973, Guenaizia commanded an armored brigade during the Yom Kippur War. Guenaizia was promoted to general in 1984, and Commander of the Air Force in 1985, which he held along with deputy Chief of Staff until 1990, when he was appointed Chief of Staff. He was promoted to major general in 1991.

In 1993, after three years as Chief of Staff, he retired and began a diplomatic career as ambassador of Algeria to Switzerland. He was stationed in Bern until 2000. On May 1, 2005, he was appointed Delegate Minister to the Minister of Defense until 2013.

=== Personal life ===
Guenaizia is the uncle of Algerian artist Myriam Guenaizia. On February 4, 2019, Guenaizia died at his home in Geneva, Switzerland.

=== Decorations ===
Guenaizia is decorated with the National Liberation Army medal, the People's National Army medal, the Military Merit Medal, the Medal of Honor, and the National Order of Merit. He also holds the commemorative medal and the military star for participating in the Yom Kippur War by the President of Egypt.
