= 1967 Algerian coup attempt =

1967 Algerian coup d'état attempt
Date	14–16 December 1967
Location	Algeria
Result	Coup suppressed

Belligerents
People's Democratic Republic of Algeria; Algerian People's National Army; Algerian Land Forces Loyalist; Algerian Air Force	(Algeria) Algerian People's National Army rebels; 2 tank Battalion

Commanders and leaders
Houari Boumédiène	Tahar Zbiri

The 1967 Algerian coup attempt was a failed attempt to overthrow the Algerian President Houari Boumédiène by the Chief of Staff of the Algerian People's National Army, Colonel Tahar Zbiri, from 14 to 16 December 1967. The coup was quickly suppressed by the use of air power against the rebel tank columns.
