= Chief of Staff of the People's National Army =

Highest position in the Algeria's National Armed Forces

- رئيس أركان الجيش الوطني الشعبي (Arabic); Chef d'État-Major de l'Armée nationale populaire (French)
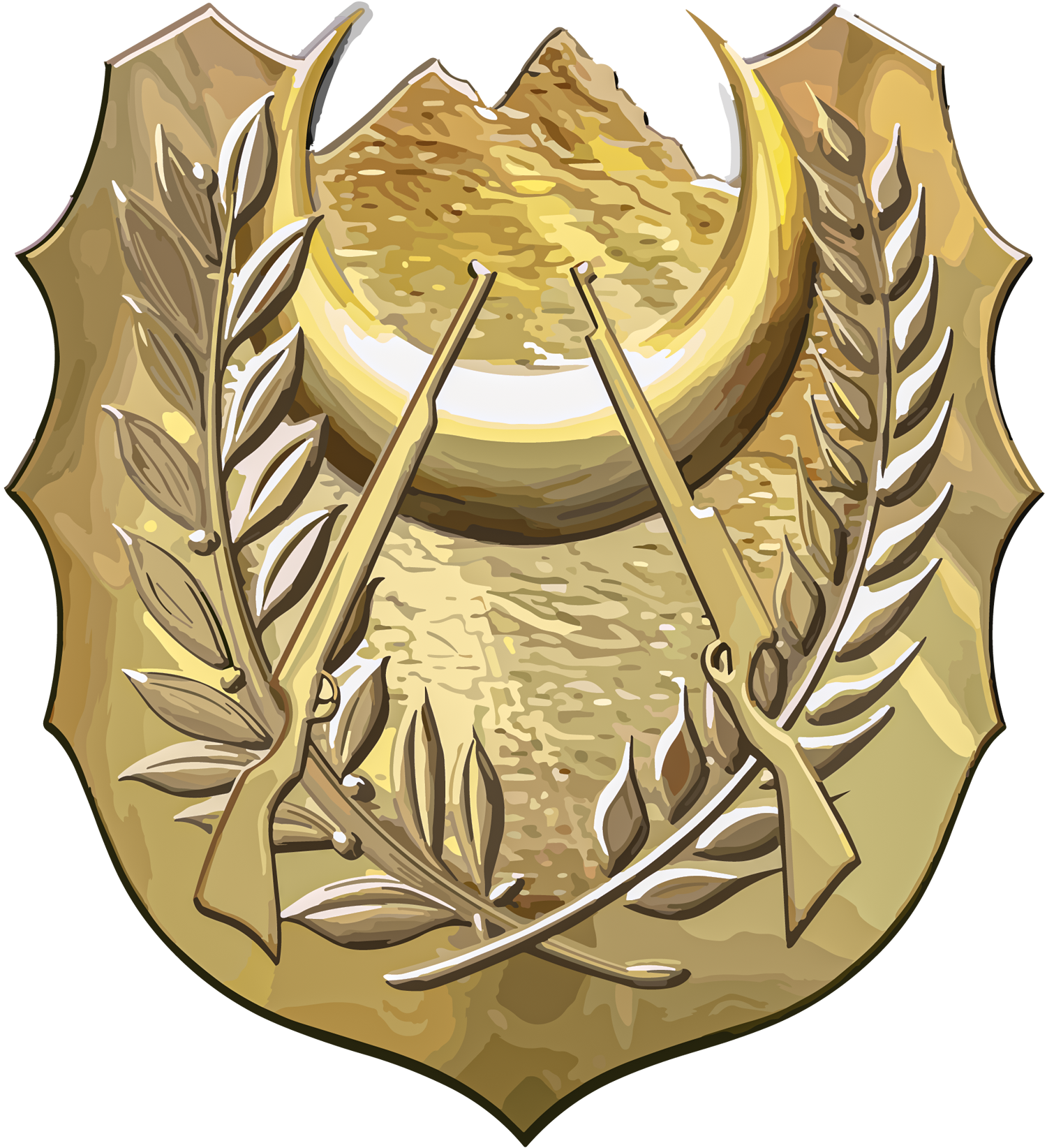

- Incumbent; Army general Saïd Chengriha since 23 December 2019
- Ministry of National Defense
- Type: Chief of staff
- Reports to: Minister of National Defense
- Seat: Algiers
- Appointer: President of Algeria
- Precursor: Chief of the ALN
- Formation: 4 March 1964
- First holder: Colonel Tahar Zbiri
- Website: Official website

The Chief of Staff of People's National Army (Arabic: رئيس أركان الجيش الوطني الشعبي, romanized: Raʾīs ʾArkān al-Ǧayš al-Waṭanī al-Šaʿbī; French: Chef d'État-Major de l'Armée nationale populaire) is the highest position in the Algerian People's National Army. The position was abolished for many years after Chief of Staff Tahar Zbiri staged a coup attempt against President Houari Boumédiène.

The current chief of staff is Saïd Chengriha, who has served in the position since the death of Ahmed Gaid Salah on 23 December 2019.

== List of officeholders ==
No.	Portrait	Name (Birth–Death)	Term of office			Branch	Ref.
No.	Portrait	Name (Birth–Death)	Took office	Left office	Time in office	Branch	Ref.
1		Colonel; Tahar Zbiri (1929–2024)	4 March 1964	1 November 1967	3 years, 242 days		
Abolished 1 November 1967 – 28 November 1984
2		Major general Mostefa Belloucif (1939–2010)	28 November 1984	22 November 1986	1 year, 359 days	Algerian Land Forces	
3		Major general Abdellah Belhouchet (1924–2003)	22 November 1986	16 November 1988	1 year, 360 days	Algerian Land Forces	
4		Major general Khaled Nezzar (1937–2023)	16 November 1988	25 July 1990	1 year, 251 days	Algerian Land Forces	
5		Major general Abdelmalek Guenaizia (1936–2019)	25 July 1990	10 July 1993	2 years, 350 days	Algerian Air Force	
6		Major general Mohamed Lamari (1939–2012)	10 July 1993	3 August 2004	11 years, 24 days	Algerian Land Forces	
7		Army corps general Ahmed Gaid Salah (1940–2019)	3 August 2004	23 December 2019 #	15 years, 142 days	Algerian Land Forces	
–		Army general Saïd Chengriha (born 1945)	23 December 2019	3 July 2020	193 days	Algerian Land Forces	
8		Army general Saïd Chengriha (born 1945)	3 July 2020	Incumbent	6 years, 84 days	Algerian Land Forces	
