= Algeria–Russia relations =

- Algeria: Russia

Diplomatic mission
- Embassy of Algeria in Moscow, Russia: Embassy of Russia in Algiers, Algeria

Envoy
- Russian Ambassador to Algeria Valerian Shuvaev: Algerian Ambassador to Russia Boumediene Guennad

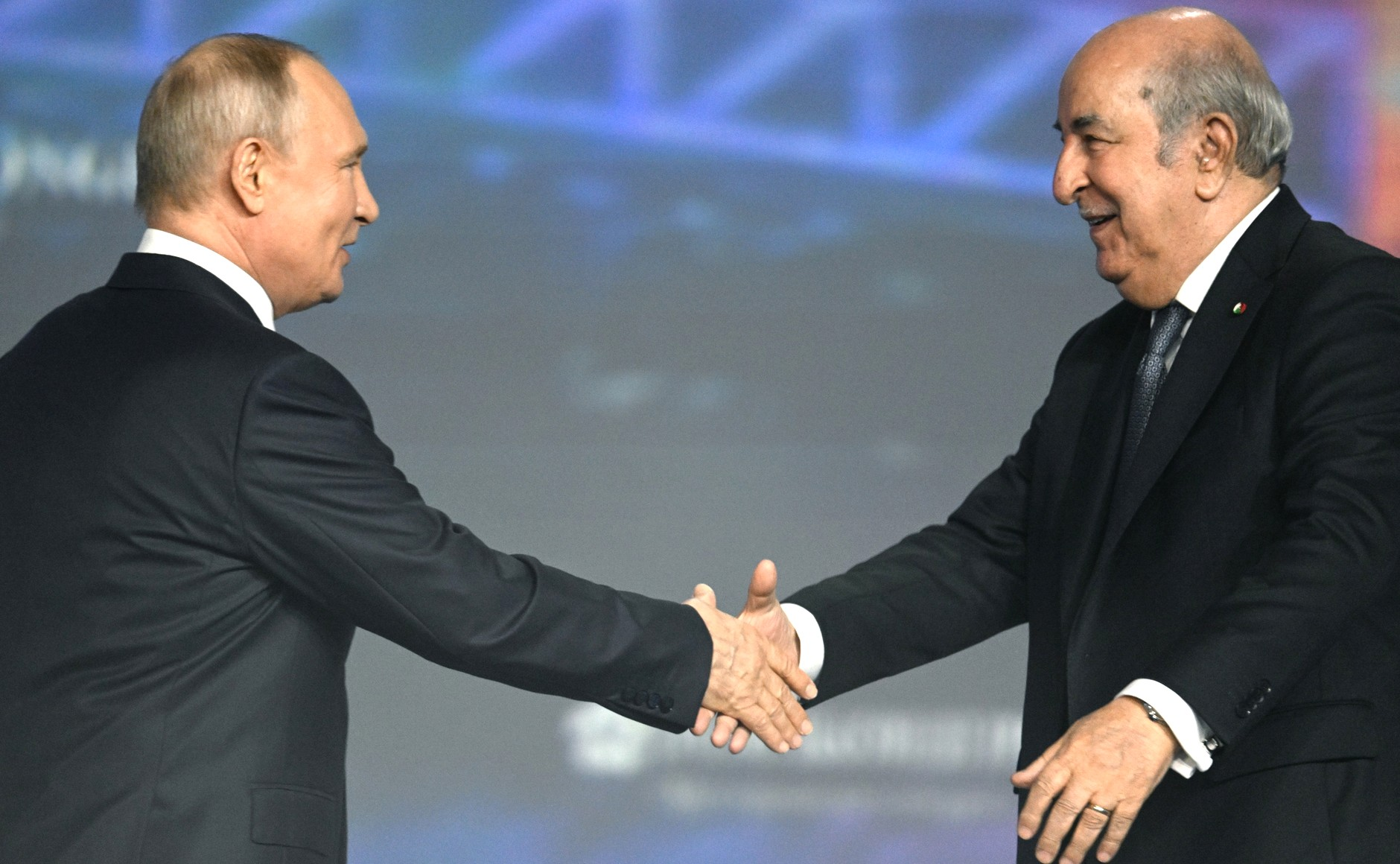
Russia President Vladimir Putin and Algerian President Abdelmadjid Tebboune at the St. Petersburg International Economic Forum, 16 June 2023

Russia has an embassy in Algiers and a consulate in Annaba, and Algeria has an embassy in Moscow. Algeria currently enjoys very strong relations with Russia. The Russian embassy is located in Algiers and the Algerian embassy is located in Moscow.

== Background ==
=== Cold War Era ===
==== Early years ====
Throughout the Algerian War of Independence, the Soviet Union had been providing military, technical and material assistance to Algeria. The USSR was the first country in the world to de facto recognize the Provisional Government of the Algerian Republic in October 1960, and then de jure on March 23, 1962, by establishing diplomatic relations with this country (a few months before the official proclamation of its independence).

In December 1963, the Soviet Union and Algeria signed an agreement on economic and technical cooperation. The USSR committed itself to provide assistance in reconstructing and building industrial plants, agricultural development, geological exploration, personnel training, etc. The Soviet Union granted Algeria a long-term loan in the amount of 90 million rubles. In May 1964, the countries signed an agreement, under which the USSR agreed to provide technical assistance in the construction of a metallurgical plant in the city of Annaba (another long-term loan of 115 million rubles was granted for these needs).

Newly independent, Algeria recognized the importance of 'unity and convergence' in Third World countries in order to achieve domestic goals. This could be expressed by their support of the non-aligned movement, which began with the FLN's involvement in the 1960s.

==== 1970s ====
Algeria was close with the Soviet Union in the 1970s and 1980s because of the supply of arms. The approximation by the Russian press is that 'Moscow supplied 11 billion dollars in military equipment to Algeria between 1962 and 1989, equal to 70-80 percent of Algeria's inventory' and this deal mainly came about through the use of loans. In 1993, it was estimated that 90% of the Algerian army's inventory was of Soviet origin.

At the same time as these relations were occurring, Algeria had taken an active stance in the Non-Aligned Movement. In 1973, Houari Boumediène hosted the Non-Aligned Movement in Algiers. According to historians it was 'with the observation that recent co-operation between Moscow and Washington looked very much like a superpower 'pretension to reign over the world". Boumediène cooperated closely with Moscow and Washington on bilateral levels but his view, iterated by hosting the Non-Aligned summit, was not one of supporting either side in the Cold War. One of the main points emphasized at Bandung, the birthplace of the Non Aligned movement, was that the Third World countries should take a stand against colonialism and neo-colonialism. In a post-colonial Algeria, subscribing to this view was a necessity. By the mid-1970s, Algeria was fully engaged in the zenith of the Non-Aligned Movement, wary of imperial powers which looked down upon the Third World. Nevertheless, presidential visits, diplomatic ties, and cordial bilateral relations continued with the two superpowers.

=== Post Cold War ===
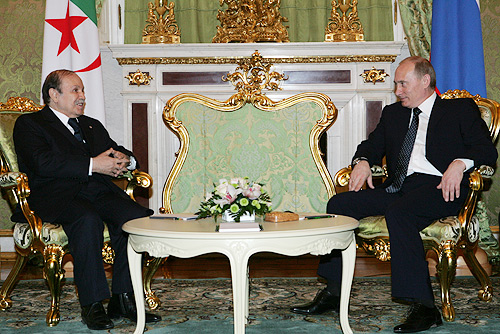
Algerian president Abdelaziz Bouteflika with Russian president Vladimir Putin, 19 February 2008

A different atmosphere was on the rise in the 1990s as Algeria stopped making the loan repayments to Russia, and after Putin's rise, Algeria joined NATO'S "Mediterranean Dialogue" with other Middle Eastern countries such as Egypt.

Bouteflika's presidency, which began in April 1999, was followed shortly by Putin's presidency and the two leaders pushed for the return to more cordial relations, including discussions of arms sales and economic cooperation. In 2006, Algeria's 5.7 billion dollar debt was forgiven, and Algeria gave a 7.5 billion dollar arms deal to Russia, the first major African arms deal of Russian Federation. Bilateral relations at this point regained in strength.

=== Recent relations ===
In 1993, the Joint Russian-Algerian Commission on Trade, Economic, and Scientific-Technical Cooperation was established. The commission has held several meetings, focusing on enhancing bilateral trade and collaboration in various sectors. Algeria is one of Russia's top trade partners in Africa, along with Morocco and Egypt.

On 13 June 2023, Algerian president Abdelmadjid Tebboune started a three-day visit to Russia. During a meeting with Russian president Vladimir Putin, they pledged to deepen the "strategic partnership" between Russia and Algeria.

In July 2023, former Algerian prime minister Aymen Benabderrahmane attended the 2023 Russia–Africa Summit in Saint Petersburg.

In November 2023, In a constantly evolving global geopolitical context, a meeting of crucial importance took place in Algiers, the capital of Algeria, during the 21st session of the Algerian-Russian Joint Intergovernmental Commission. At the heart of this encounter, General Saïd Chanegriha, Chief of Staff of the Algerian People's National Army (ANP), welcomed Dmitri Chugaev, director of the Federal Service for Military-Technical Cooperation Of The Federation Of Russia. This meeting provided an opportunity to discuss military cooperation between the two countries and explore new avenues of collaboration in areas of mutual interest.

== High level visits ==
Guest	Host	Place of visit	Date of visit	Notes
(Algeria) President Houari Boumediène	(Soviet Union) Chairman Leonid Brezhnev	Moscow	13-18 December 1965	
(Algeria) President Houari Boumediène	(Soviet Union) Chairman Leonid Brezhnev	Moscow	June–July 1967	
(Soviet Union) Chairman Nikolai Podgorny	(Algeria) President Houari Boumediène	Algiers	26 March-1 April 1969	
(Algeria) President Abdelaziz Bouteflika	(Russia) President Vladimir Putin	Moscow	3-6 April 2001	
(Russia) President Vladimir Putin	(Algeria) President Abdelaziz Bouteflika	Algiers	10 March 2006	
(Algeria) President Abdelaziz Bouteflika	(Russia) President Vladimir Putin	Moscow	18-19 February 2008	
(Russia) President Dmitry Medvedev	(Algeria) President Abdelaziz Bouteflika	Algiers	6 October 2010	
(Algeria) President Abdelmajid Tebboune	(Russia) President Vladimir Putin	Moscow	13 June 2023	

== Economic relations ==
Russia and Algeria have a long history of economic and trade cooperation dating back to the 1960s. Algeria sought Russia's assistance in developing key industries such as energy, mining, metallurgy, engineering, and water management. The USSR played a significant role in establishing important industrial facilities in Algeria during that time.

The energy sector has been a major area of cooperation. Russian companies, including Rosneft and Stroytransgaz, have formed partnerships and consortiums to develop hydrocarbon resources in Algeria. They have been involved in projects such as pipeline construction, renovation, and exploration of hydrocarbon reserves.

Cultural exchanges between Russia and Algeria have also taken place. Both countries have organized events like the Days of Algerian Culture in Russia and the Week of Algerian Cinema in Moscow, promoting cultural understanding and appreciation. Additionally, there is a significant presence of Algerian graduates from Russian civil and military schools, showcasing the educational ties between the two nations.

Overall, the cooperation between Russia and Algeria spans various sectors and has promoted economic development, trade, energy collaboration, and cultural exchange.
