= Army corps general =

Military rank

An army corps general or corps general is a rank held by a general officer who commands an army corps. The rank originates from the French Revolutionary system, and is used by a number of countries. Normally, the rank is above the divisional general and below the army general, so it usually corresponds to the lieutenant general. However, in some countries such as Spain, Brazil, and Peru, the rank of army corps general is not used, in Spain the rank of army corps general is replaced by the rank of lieutenant general, while in some countries such as Brazil and Peru, the rank of army general is immediately above that of divisional general.

== Algeria ==
The rank of général de corps d'armée was created in November 1994 as the highest rank in the Armée nationale populaire (ANP), the rank below it being Major General. Its rank badge shows three stars. The first officer to be promoted to the rank was general Mohamed Lamari, chief of staff of the ANP (1993-2004). In 2006 three officers were promoted to the rank - Ahmed Gaid Salah, chief of staff of the ANP, Bennabes Ghzeiel, military advisor to president Abdelaziz Bouteflika and former head of the gendarmerie, and Toufik Mediene, head of the Département du Renseignement et de la Sécurité. After Ghezeiel's death in July 2014, only Toufik and Gaid Salah were the only living holders of the rank. Since July 2015, they have been joined by general Ahmed Bousteila, commander of the Gendarmerie nationale, and general Benali Benali, commander of the Garde républicaine.

== Czechoslovakia ==
In the Czechoslovak Army, the rank of a corps general (Czech: sborový generál, Slovak: zborový generál) existed between 1947 and 1953. It was replaced by the colonel general (generálplukovník) rank under Soviet Army influence in 1953.

== Cuba ==
The Cuban Revolutionary Armed Forces rank of general de cuerpo de ejército operates similarly to that in France and Algeria.

== France ==
The rank of général de corps d'armée ("general of an army corps" is junior to the rank of général d'armée and senior to général de division. Officially, it is not a rank, but a style and position (rang et appellation in French) bestowed upon some généraux de division (which is the highest substantive rank in the French Army). It is the third of four general ranks. The first mention of the rank is in a circular on uniforms dated 17 March 1921 which gives the rank of commandant de corps d'armée to certain divisional general and the rank of commandant d'armée to divisional generals who were also members of the Conseil supérieur de la guerre. These ranks were simplified by a decree creating the ranks of général de corps d'armée and général d'armée on 6 June 1939

The rank insignia is four silver stars arranged in a diamond pattern.

The equivalent rank in the Air and Space Force is général de corps aérien ("general of air army corps") and in the Navy is vice-amiral d'escadre ("vice-admiral of squadron").

However, Général under the ancient regime and the Général en chef under the imperial regime correspond to the army corps general, but are equivalent to general.

Général de corps d'armée in the French Army

Général de corps d'armée in the French Gendarmerie

Général de corps aérien in the French Air and Space Force

== Italy ==
In Italy the rank of generale di corpo d'armata or Tenente Generale is shown by three stars and a 'greca' for the Army, Guardia di Finanza and Carabinieri. It is equivalent to squadron admiral in the Italian Navy and generale di squadra aerea in the Italian Air Force.

== Switzerland ==
The Swiss Armed Forces utilize a similar rank called Corps Commander, called Commandant de corps in French, Comandante di corpo in Italian and Korpskommandant in German. There are at least 3 of them at any given time, they are the Chief of the Armed Forces, Chief of Joint Operations Command, additionally acting as Deputy Chief of the Armed Forces, and Chief of Training and Education Command. As of August 2026, they are Benedikt Roos, Laurent Michaud and Gregor Metzler.

Shoulder broad insignia of a Corps Commander (Uniform A)

Camouflage insignia of a Corps Commander

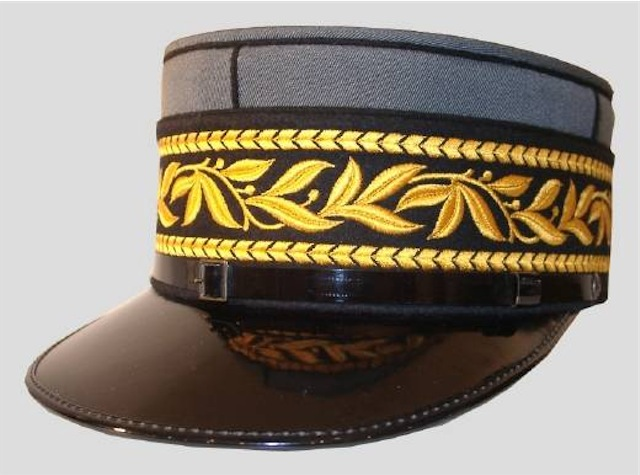
Kepi of a Corps Commander (Uniform A)

== Army corps general's insignia ==
Général de corps d'armée
Arabic: فريق, romanized: Fariq
(Algerian People's National Army)

Général de corps d'armée
(Benin Army)

Général de corps d'armée
(Burkina Faso Ground Forces)

Général de corps d'armée
(Cameroon Ground Forces)

Général de corps d'armée
(Central African Ground Forces)

Général de corps d'armée
(Chadian Ground Forces)

Général de corps d'armée
(Congolese Ground Forces)

General de cuerpo de ejército
(Cuban Revolutionary Army)

Général de corps d'armée
(French Army)

Général de corps d'armée
(Guinea Ground Forces)

Generale di Corpo d'Armata
(Tenente Generale)
(Italian Army)

Général de corps d'armée
(Ivory Coast Ground Forces)

Général de corps d'armée
(Madagascar Ground Forces)

Général de corps d'armée
(Malian Ground Forces)

General de corp de armată
(Moldovan Ground Forces)

Général de corps d'armée
Arabic: Fariq 'awwal
(Royal Moroccan Army)

Général de corps d'armée
(Niger Ground Forces)

Général de corps d'armée
(Senegalese Ground Forces)

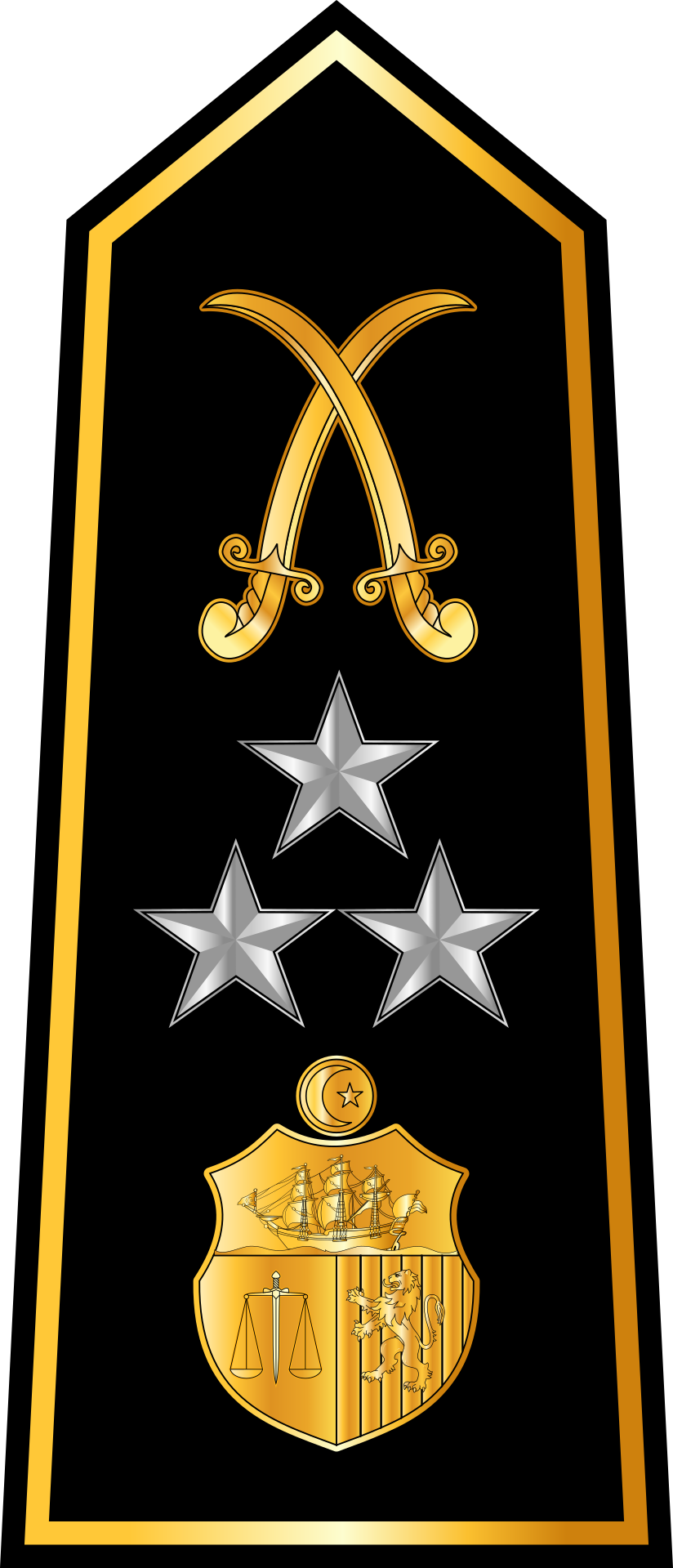
Général de corps d'armée
Arabic: فريق أول, romanized: Fariq 'awal
(Tunisian Army)
