= False flag =

Covert operation designed to deceive

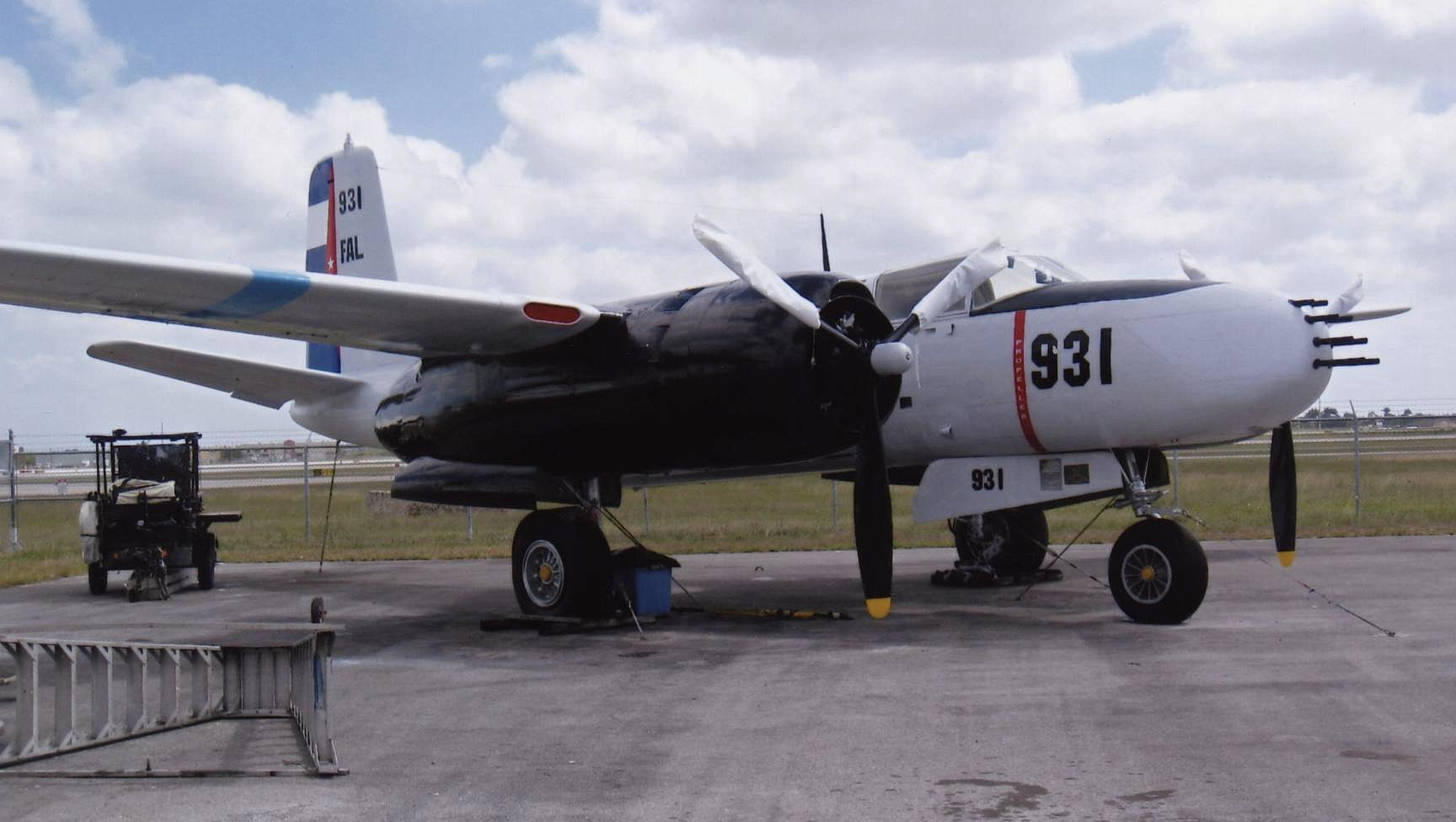
A U.S. Douglas A-26C Invader painted in false Cuban Air Force livery depicting those used in the Bay of Pigs Invasion undertaken by the CIA-sponsored paramilitary group Brigade 2506 in April 1961

A false flag operation is an act committed with the intent of disguising the actual source of responsibility and pinning blame on another party. The term "false flag" originated in the 16th century as a strictly figurative expression for an intentional misrepresentation of someone's allegiance, and centuries later also came to be used literally for a ruse in naval warfare whereby a vessel flew the flag of a neutral or enemy country to hide its true identity. The naval tactic was initially used by pirates and privateers to deceive other ships into allowing them to move closer before attacking them. Showing a literal false flag was later deemed an acceptable practice during naval warfare according to international maritime laws, provided that a vessel displayed its true flag before commencing an attack.

The term today extends to include countries that organize attacks on themselves and make the attacks appear to be by enemy nations or terrorists, thus giving the nation that attacked itself a pretext for domestic repression or foreign military aggression (as well as to engender sympathy). Similarly deceptive activities carried out during peacetime by individuals or nongovernmental organizations have also been called false-flag operations, but are more commonly called "frameup", "stitch up", or "setup".

== Use in warfare ==
In land warfare, such operations are generally deemed acceptable under certain circumstances, such as to deceive enemies, provided the deception is not perfidious and that all such deceptions are discarded before opening fire upon the enemy. Similarly, in naval warfare such a deception is considered permissible, provided the false flag is lowered and the true flag raised before engaging in battle. Auxiliary cruisers operated in such a fashion in both World Wars, as did Q-ships, while merchant vessels were encouraged to use false flags for protection. Such masquerades promoted confusion not just of the enemy but of historical accounts. In 1914, the Battle of Trindade was fought between the British auxiliary cruiser RMS Carmania and the German auxiliary cruiser SMS Cap Trafalgar, which had been altered to look like Carmania.

Another notable example was the World War II German commerce raider Kormoran, which surprised and sank the Australian light cruiser HMAS Sydney in 1941 while disguised as a Dutch merchant ship, causing the greatest loss of life on an Australian warship. While Kormoran was fatally damaged in the engagement and its crew captured, the outcome represented a considerable psychological victory for the Germans.

The British used a Kriegsmarine ensign in the St Nazaire Raid and captured a German code book. The old destroyer Campbeltown, which the British planned to sacrifice in the operation, was provided with cosmetic modifications that involved cutting the ship's funnels and chamfering the edges to resemble a German Type 23 torpedo boat. By this ruse, the British got within two miles (3 km) of the harbour before the defences responded, where the explosive-rigged Campbeltown and commandos successfully disabled or destroyed the key dock structures of the port.

=== Air warfare ===
Between December 1922 and February 1923, a commission of jurists at the Hague drafted a set of rules concerning the Control of Wireless Telegraphy in Time of War and Air Warfare. They included:

- Art. 3. A military aircraft must carry an exterior mark indicating its nationality and its military character.
- Art. 19. The use of false exterior marks is forbidden.

This draft was never adopted as a legally binding treaty, but the International Committee of the Red Cross states in its introduction on the draft: "To a great extent, [the draft rules] correspond to the customary rules and general principles underlying treaties on the law of war on land and at sea", and as such these two non-controversial articles were already part of customary law.

=== Land warfare ===
In land warfare, the use of a false flag is similar to that of naval warfare: the trial of Waffen SS officer Otto Skorzeny—who planned and commanded Operation Greif—by a U.S. military tribunal at the Dachau trials included a finding that Skorzeny was not guilty of a crime by ordering his men into action in American uniforms. He had relayed to his men the warning of German legal experts: if they fought in American uniforms, they would be breaking the laws of war; however, they probably were not doing so simply by wearing the American uniforms. During the trial, a number of arguments were advanced to substantiate this position and the German and U.S. military seem to have been in agreement.

In the transcript of the trial, it is mentioned that Paragraph 43 of the Field Manual published by the War Department, United States Army, on 1 October 1940, under the entry Rules of Land Warfare states: "National flags, insignias and uniforms as a ruse – in practice it has been authorized to make use of these as a ruse. The foregoing rule (Article 23 of the Annex of the IV Hague Convention), does not prohibit such use, but does prohibit their improper use. It is certainly forbidden to make use of them during a combat. Before opening fire upon the enemy, they must be discarded."

== As pretexts for war ==
=== Russo-Swedish War ===
In 1788, the head tailor at the Royal Swedish Opera received an order to sew a number of Russian military uniforms. These were then used by Swedes to stage an attack on Puumala, a Swedish outpost on the Russo-Swedish border, on 27 June 1788. This caused an outrage in Stockholm and persuaded the Riksdag of the Estates, the Swedish national assembly, who until then had refused to agree to an offensive war against Russia. The Puumala incident allowed King Gustav III of Sweden, who lacked the constitutional authority to initiate unprovoked hostilities without the Estates' consent, to launch the Russo-Swedish War (1788–1790).

=== Mexican American war ===
In 1846, Texas claimed the Rio Grande as its border while Mexico had declared that it was the Nueces River, farther north, and in early 1846 President Polk sent Zachary Taylor's army into the strip between them with the intention of provoking the Mexican Army. When Mexican cavalry attacked a U.S. patrol there in April, Polk persuaded Congress into believing that Mexico had shed American blood on American soil, and Congress declared war. Critics at the time , including Abraham Lincoln, argued the land was disputed rather than clearly American, and many historians agree the U.S. provoked the conflict. The war ended in 1848 with the Treaty of Guadalupe Hidalgo, in which Mexico ceded California, Nevada, Utah and most of Arizona and New Mexico, and recognized the Rio Grande as the Texas border.

=== Franco-Prussian War ===
On 13 July 1870, Otto von Bismarck published the Ems Dispatch, an internal message from King Wilhelm I to Bismarck regarding certain demands made by the French ambassador. In the version purposefully released to the public, Bismarck instead made it sound like the King had gravely disrespected the ambassador – a ploy to trick Emperor Napoleon III into declaring war on the North German Confederation, with the end goal of unifying the northern and southern German states. This ploy would be successful, as Napoleon III would declare war six days later; and six months later, the Confederation would win and unify the German states.

=== Second Sino-Japanese War ===
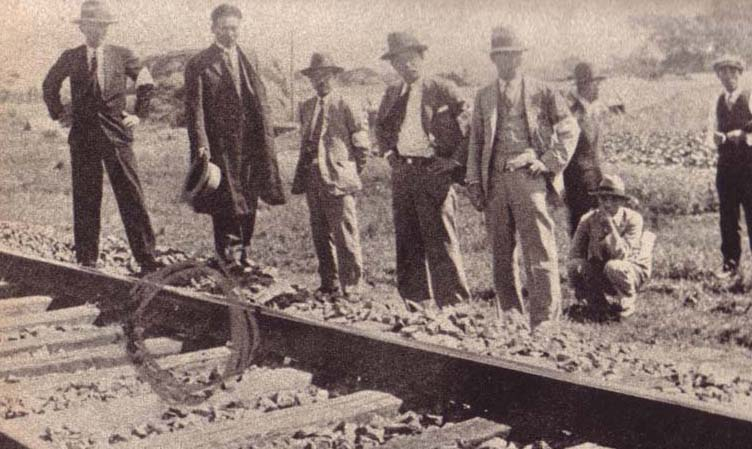
Japanese experts inspect the scene of the "railway sabotage" on the South Manchurian Railway.

In September 1931, Seishirō Itagaki and other Japanese mid- to junior-grade officers, without the knowledge of the Tokyo government, fabricated a pretext for invading Manchuria by blowing up a section of railway. Though the explosion was too weak to disrupt operations on the rail line, the Japanese nevertheless used the Mukden incident to seize Manchuria and create a puppet government in the form of the nominally independent state of Manchukuo.

=== World War II ===
==== Gleiwitz incident ====
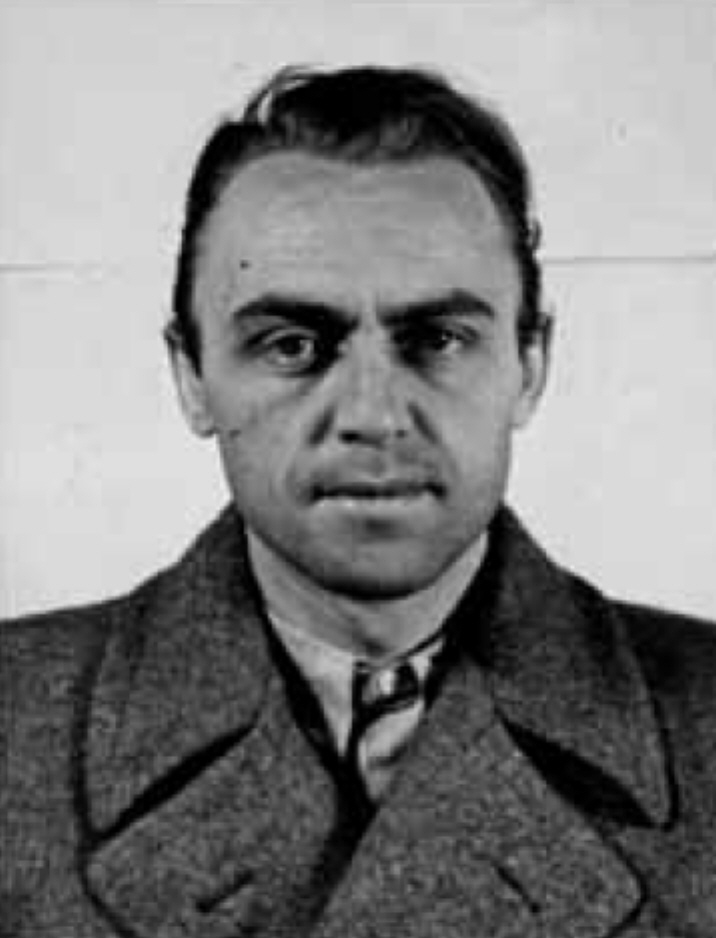
Alfred Naujocks

The Gleiwitz incident in 1939 involved Reinhard Heydrich fabricating evidence of a Polish attack against Germany to mobilize German public opinion for war and to justify the war against Poland. Alfred Naujocks was a key organiser of the operation under orders from Heydrich. It led to the deaths of Nazi concentration camp victims who were dressed as German soldiers and then shot by the Gestapo to make it seem that they had been shot by Polish soldiers. This, along with other false flag operations in Operation Himmler, would be used to mobilize support from the German population for the start of World War II in Europe.

The operation failed to convince international public opinion of the German claims, and both Britain and France – Poland's allies – declared war two days after Germany invaded Poland.

==== Winter War ====
On 26 November 1939, the Soviet army shelled Mainila, a Russian village near the Finnish border. Soviet authorities blamed Finland for the attack and used the incident as a pretext to invade Finland, starting the Winter War, four days later.

=== Cuban regime change ===
==== Operation Northwoods ====
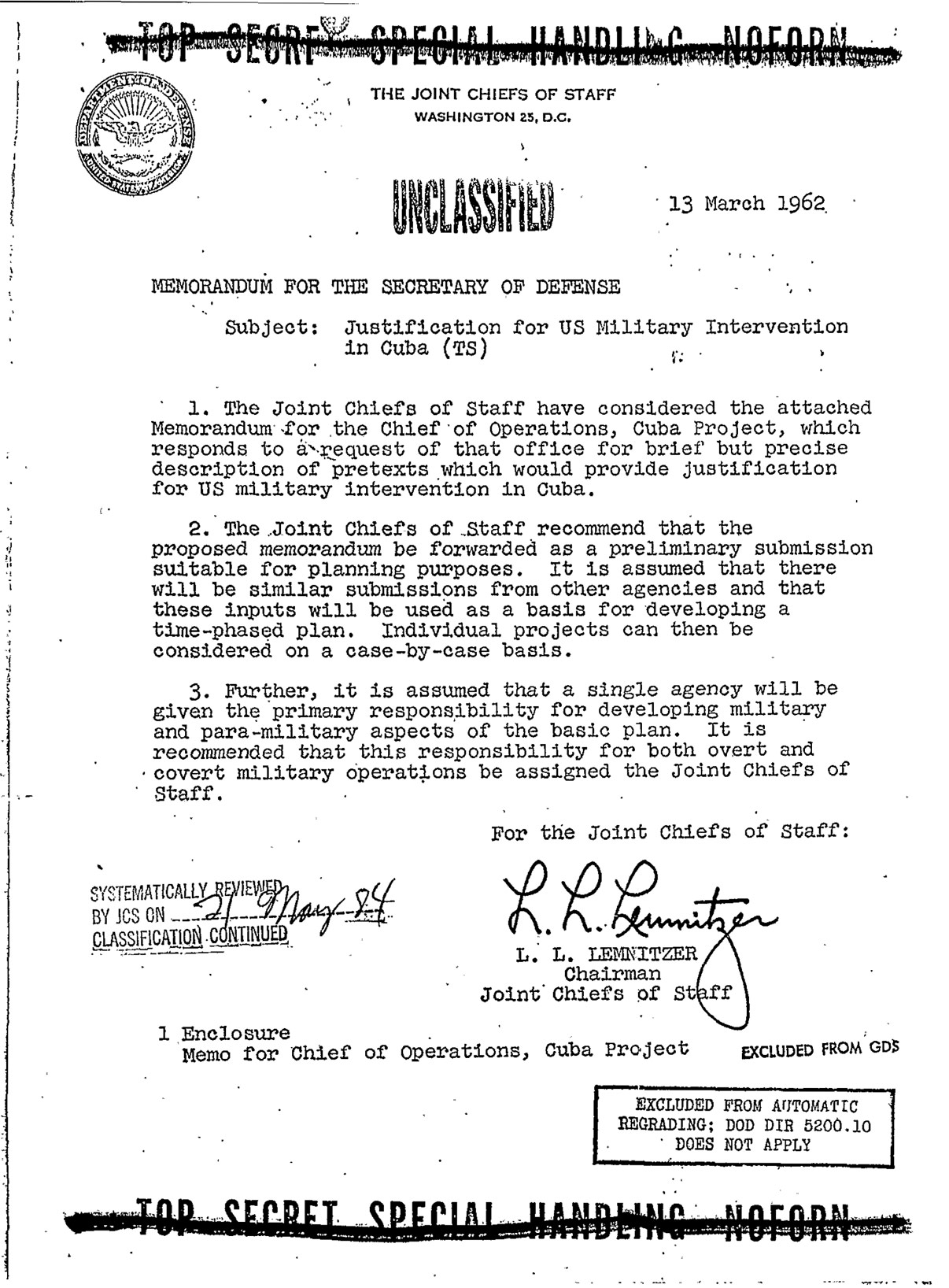
Operation Northwoods memorandum (13 March 1962)

Operation Northwoods, a 1962 plot proposed but never executed by the U.S. Department of Defense for a war with Cuba, involved scenarios such as fabricating the hijacking or shooting down of passenger and military planes, sinking a U.S. ship in the vicinity of Cuba, burning crops, sinking a boat filled with Cuban refugees, attacks by alleged Cuban infiltrators inside the United States, and harassment of U.S. aircraft and shipping, and the destruction of aerial drones by aircraft disguised as Cuban MiGs. These actions would be blamed on Cuba, and would be a pretext for an invasion of Cuba and the overthrow of Fidel Castro's communist government. It was authorised by the Joint Chiefs of Staff, but then rejected by President John F. Kennedy. The surprise discovery of the documents relating to Operation Northwoods was a result of the comprehensive search for records related to the assassination of President John F. Kennedy by the Assassination Records Review Board in the mid-1990s. Information about Operation Northwoods was later publicized by James Bamford.

=== Russian invasion of Ukraine ===
In January and February 2022, U.S. officials warned that Russian operatives were planning a false flag operation in Ukraine in order to justify a military intervention. In the days leading up to the Russian invasion of Ukraine on 24 February, the Russian government intensified its disinformation campaign, with Russian state media promoting false flags on a nearly hourly basis purporting to show Ukrainian forces attacking Russia, in a bid to justify an invasion of Ukraine. Many of the disinformation videos were poor and amateur in quality, with mismatching metadata showing incorrect dates, and evidence from Bellingcat researchers and other independent journalists showed that the claimed attacks, explosions, and evacuations in Donbas were staged by Russia.

=== Operation Southern Spear ===
During Operation Southern Spear, Venezuela claimed to have prevented several false flag attacks planned by the United States and the Venezuelan opposition. On 7 October 2025, the American embassy in Caracas was reinforced following tips concerning a bomb plot, while on 26 October, four allegedly CIA-backed mercenaries that had planned to attack the USS Gravely while it was docked in Trinidad and Tobago were captured.

== As a tactic to undermine political opponents ==
=== Lermontov detachment ===
During the Caucasus War a Russian imperial army special unit named "Lermontov detachment" (for a few months it was headed by Mikhail Lermontov) operated behind enemy lines disguised as the insurgents. An insider account reported that "they shaved their heads, grew beards, dressed them Circassian style, and armed them with double-barreled shotguns with bayonets".

=== Soviet covert operations on German-occupied territories during World War II ===
During World War II Soviet airborne units, operating on enemy-occupied territory, posed as German Wehrmacht personnel using Wehrmacht uniform.

=== Soviet covert operations in Ukraine ===
In the post-World War II Ukraine, Soviet NKVD employed units dressed as Ukrainian Insurgent Army fighters. They committed a number of well-documented atrocities against civilian population posing as the insurgents.

=== Operation TPAJAX ===
On 4 April 1953, the CIA was ordered to undermine the government of Iran over a four-month period, as a precursor to overthrowing Prime Minister Mohammad Mosaddegh. One tactic used to undermine Mosaddegh was to carry out false flag attacks "on mosques and key public figures", to be blamed on Iranian communists loyal to the government.

The CIA operation was code-named TPAJAX. The tactic of a "directed campaign of bombings by Iranians posing as members of the Communist party" involved the bombing of "at least one" well known Muslim's house by CIA agents posing as Communists. The CIA determined that the tactic of false flag attacks added to the "positive outcome" of TPAJAX.

However, as "the C.I.A. burned nearly all of its files on its role in the 1953 coup in Iran", the true extent of the tactic has been difficult for historians to discern.

=== Operation Susannah ===
In the summer of 1954, a group of Egyptian Jews – recruited by Israel's Militant Intelligence Directorate Aman – planned to bomb American, British, and Egyptian civil targets in Egypt. The bombings were to be blamed on the Muslim Brotherhood, Egyptian Communists, "unspecified malcontents", or "local nationalists", with the aim of creating a climate of sufficient violence and instability to induce the British government to refrain from evacuating its troops occupying the Suez Canal.

Only two bombs were successfully detonated before the plot was discovered. Unknown to Israel Prime Minister Moshe Sharet, the exposé caused a scandal in Israel, with Israeli officials blaming one another for the operation and the Israeli defense minister, Pinhas Lavon, resigning under pressure. Later, two investigative committees found that Lavon was unaware of the operation.

== Failed operations ==
Due to its deceptive nature a false flag operation can fail in such a manner as to implicate the perpetrator rather than the intended victim.

A notable example is an April 2022 FSB operation where Ukrainian would-be assassins of Russian propagandist Vladimir Solovyov were filmed while being arrested. The footage published by the FSB was, however, found to implicate the FSB as having staged the arrest. Together with weapons, drugs, Ukrainian passports, and Nazi memorabilia the footage also prominently showed three expansion packs for The Sims 3 video game. Investigative journalist Eliot Higgins interpreted this to mean that the arrest was in fact staged, with its organizers misunderstanding an instruction "to get 3 SIMs". Further lending credence to the arrest being staged was footage of a note with a Russian phrase, which in fact read signature unclear. This was again interpreted as a misunderstood instruction, this time taken too literally. The FSB subsequently published a version of the footage with the Sims games blurred out.

== Pseudo-operations ==
Pseudo-operations are those in which forces of one power disguise themselves as enemy forces. For example, a state power may disguise teams of operatives as insurgents and, with the aid of defectors, infiltrate insurgent areas. The aim of such pseudo-operations may be to gather short- or long-term intelligence or to engage in active operations, in particular assassinations of important enemies. However, they usually involve both, as the risks of exposure rapidly increase with time and intelligence gathering eventually leads to violent confrontation. Pseudo-operations may be directed by military or police forces, or both. Police forces are usually best suited to intelligence tasks; however, military provide the structure needed to back up such pseudo-ops with military response forces. According to US military expert Lawrence Cline (2005), "the teams typically have been controlled by police services, but this largely was due to the weaknesses in the respective military intelligence systems".

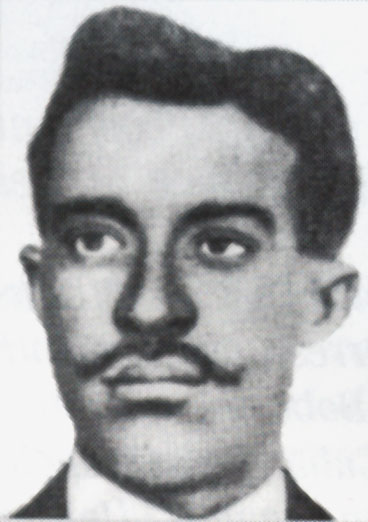
Charlemagne Péralte of Haiti was assassinated in 1919 after checkpoints were passed by military disguised as guerrilla fighters.

The State Political Directorate (OGPU) of the Soviet Union set up such an operation from 1921 to 1926. During Operation Trust, they used loose networks of White Army supporters and extended them, creating the pseudo-"Monarchist Union of Central Russia" (MUCR) in order to help the OGPU identify real monarchists and anti-Bolsheviks.

An example of a successful assassination was United States Marine Sergeant Herman H. Hanneken leading a patrol of his Haitian Gendarmerie disguised as enemy guerrillas in 1919. The patrol successfully passed several enemy checkpoints in order to assassinate the guerilla leader Charlemagne Péralte near Grande-Rivière-du-Nord. Hanneken was awarded the Medal of Honor and was commissioned a Second Lieutenant for his deed.

During the Mau Mau uprising in the 1950s, captured Mau Mau members who switched sides and specially trained British troops initiated the pseudo-gang concept to successfully counter Mau Mau. In 1960, Frank Kitson, who was later involved in the Northern Irish conflict, published Gangs and Counter-gangs, an account of his experiences with the technique in Kenya. Information included how to counter gangs and measures of deception, including the use of defectors, which brought the issue a wider audience.

Another example of combined police and military oversight of pseudo-operations include the Selous Scouts in the former country Rhodesia (now Zimbabwe), governed by white minority rule until 1980. The Selous Scouts were formed at the beginning of Operation Hurricane, in November 1973, by Major (later Lieutenant Colonel) Ronald Reid-Daly. As with all Special Forces in Rhodesia, by 1977, they were controlled by COMOPS (Commander, Combined Operations) Commander Lieutenant General Peter Walls. The Selous Scouts were originally composed of 120 members, with all officers being white and the highest rank initially available for black soldiers being colour sergeant. They succeeded in turning approximately 800 insurgents who were then paid by Special Branch, ultimately reaching the number of 1,500 members. Engaging mainly in long-range reconnaissance and surveillance missions, they increasingly turned to offensive actions, including the attempted assassination of Zimbabwe People's Revolutionary Army leader Joshua Nkomo in Zambia. This mission was finally aborted by the Selous Scouts, and attempted again, unsuccessfully, by the Rhodesian Special Air Service.

Some offensive operations attracted international condemnation, in particular the Selous Scouts' raid on a Zimbabwe African National Liberation Army (ZANLA) camp at Nyadzonya Pungwe, Mozambique in August 1976. ZANLA was then led by Josiah Tongogara. Using Rhodesian trucks and armored cars disguised as Mozambique military vehicles, 84 scouts killed 1,284 people in the camp, registered as a refugee camp by the United Nations (UN). Even according to Reid-Daly, most of those killed were unarmed guerrillas standing in formation for a parade. The camp hospital was also set ablaze by the rounds fired by the Scouts, killing all patients. According to David Martin and Phyllis Johnson, who visited the camp shortly before the raid, it was only a refugee camp that did not host any guerrillas. It was staged for UN approval.

According to a 1978 study by the Directorate of Military Intelligence, 68% of all insurgent deaths inside Rhodesia could be attributed to the Selous Scouts, who were disbanded in 1980.

If the action is a police action, then these tactics would fall within the laws of the state initiating the pseudo, but if such actions are taken in a civil war or during a belligerent military occupation then those who participate in such actions would not be privileged belligerents. The principle of plausible deniability is usually applied for pseudo-teams. Some false flag operations have been described by Lawrence E. Cline, a retired US Army intelligence officer, as pseudo-operations, or "the use of organized teams which are disguised as guerrilla groups for long- or short-term penetration of insurgent-controlled areas".

"Pseudo-operations should be distinguished", notes Cline, "from the more common police or intelligence infiltration of guerrilla or criminal organizations. In the latter case, infiltration is normally done by individuals. Pseudo teams, on the other hand, are formed as needed from organized units, usually military or paramilitary. The use of pseudo teams has been a hallmark of a number of foreign counterinsurgency campaigns."

Similar false flag tactics were also employed during the Algerian Civil War, starting in the middle of 1994. Death squads composed of Département du Renseignement et de la Sécurité (DRS) security forces disguised themselves as Islamist terrorists and committed false flag terror attacks. Such groups included the Organisation of Young Free Algerians (OJAL) or the Secret Organisation for the Safeguard of the Algerian Republic (OSSRA). According to Roger Faligot and Pascal Kropp (1999), the OJAL was reminiscent of "the Organization of the French Algerian Resistance (ORAF), a group of counter-terrorists created in December 1956 by the Direction de la surveillance du territoire (Territorial Surveillance Directorate, or DST) whose mission was to carry out terrorist attacks with the aim of quashing any hopes of political compromise".

== Espionage ==
In espionage, the term "false flag" describes the recruiting of agents by operatives posing as representatives of a cause the prospective agents are sympathetic to, or even the agents' own government. For example, during the Cold War, several female West German civil servants were tricked into stealing classified documents by agents of the East German Stasi intelligence service pretending to be members of West German peace advocacy groups (the Stasi agents were also described as "Romeos", indicating that they also used their sex appeal to manipulate their targets, making this operation a combination of the false flag and "honey trap" techniques).

According to ex-KGB defector Jack Barsky, "Many a right-wing radical had given information to the Soviets under a 'false flag', thinking they were working with a Western ally, such as Israel, when in fact their contact was a KGB operative."

== Militant usage ==
False flag operations are also utilized by non-state actors and terrorist organizations. During the Indian security forces siege prior to the storming of the Golden Temple, Babbar Khalsa militants allegedly infiltrated buildings between CRPF lines and the positions of pro-Bhindranwale militants and fired in both directions in the hope of provoking firefights. This was allegedly done as a result of Babbar Khalsa leader Bibi Amarjit Kaur blaming Bhindranwale for the death of her husband, Fauja Singh, during the 1978 Sikh–Nirankari clash.

On 5 October 1987, LTTE fighters infiltrated between IPKF and Sri Lankan army positions in the Kankesanturai area and provoked a firefight between the two forces as part of the revenge operations in retaliation for the suicide in custody of 15 LTTE leaders who were about to be handed into Sri Lankan custody.

== Civilian usage ==
The term is popular among conspiracy theory promoters in referring to covert operations of various governments and claimed cabals. According to Columbia Journalism Review, this usage mostly "migrated to the right". However, because some historical false flag incidents occurred, historians should not fully cede the usage of the term to conspiracy theorists. Perlman says "The real danger is if we use the nonattributive 'false flags' as shorthand for conspiracy theories, without explaining what they are and who is promoting them." At the same time, Perlman writes that "people yelling that any attack attributed to someone on 'their side' was committed by 'the other side' drown out the voices of reason".

== Political campaigning ==
Political campaigning has a long history of this tactic in various forms, including in person, print media and electronically in recent years. This can involve when supporters of one candidate pose as supporters of another, or act as "straw men" for their preferred candidate to debate against. This can happen with or without the candidate's knowledge. The Canuck letter is an example of one candidate's creating a false document and attributing it as coming from another candidate in order to discredit that candidate.

In 2006, individuals practicing false flag behavior were discovered and "outed" in New Hampshire and New Jersey after blog comments claiming to be from supporters of a political candidate were traced to the IP address of paid staffers for that candidate's opponent.

On 19 February 2011, Indiana Deputy Prosecutor Carlos Lam sent a private email to Wisconsin Governor Scott Walker suggesting that he run a "'false flag' operation" to counter the protests against Walker's proposed restrictions on public employees' collective bargaining rights:

If you could employ an associate who pretends to be sympathetic to the unions' cause to physically attack you (or even use a firearm against you), you could discredit the unions ... Employing a false flag operation would assist in undercutting any support the media may be creating in favor of the unions.

The press had acquired a court order to access all of Walker's emails and Lam's email was exposed. At first, Lam vehemently denied sending the email, but eventually admitted it and resigned.

Some conservative commentators suggested that pipe bombs that were sent to prominent Democrats prior to the 2018 mid-term elections were part of a false flag effort to discredit Republicans and supporters of then-President Donald Trump. Cesar Sayoc, motivated by his belief that Democrats were "evil", was later convicted of mailing the devices to Trump's critics.

On the internet, a concern troll is a false flag pseudonym created by a user whose actual point of view is opposed to the one that the troll claims to hold. The concern troll posts in web forums devoted to its declared point of view and attempts to sway the group's actions or opinions while claiming to share their goals, but with professed "concerns". The goal is to sow fear, uncertainty, and doubt within the group often by appealing to outrage culture. This is a particular case of sockpuppeting and safe-baiting.

During the 2025 Canadian federal election campaign, Liberal Party of Canada strategists were exposed after their false flag operation failed. A CBC News journalist who was speaking with Liberal staff at a bar in Ottawa learned how "Stop the Steal" buttons were placed at a Conservative Party of Canada event. The operatives hoped attendees would wear them, which would allow Liberals to publicly conflate Conservative supporters and leader Pierre Poilievre with Donald Trump. After the false flag mission was reported by the journalist, Liberal leader Mark Carney reassigned those involved.

=== Ideological ===
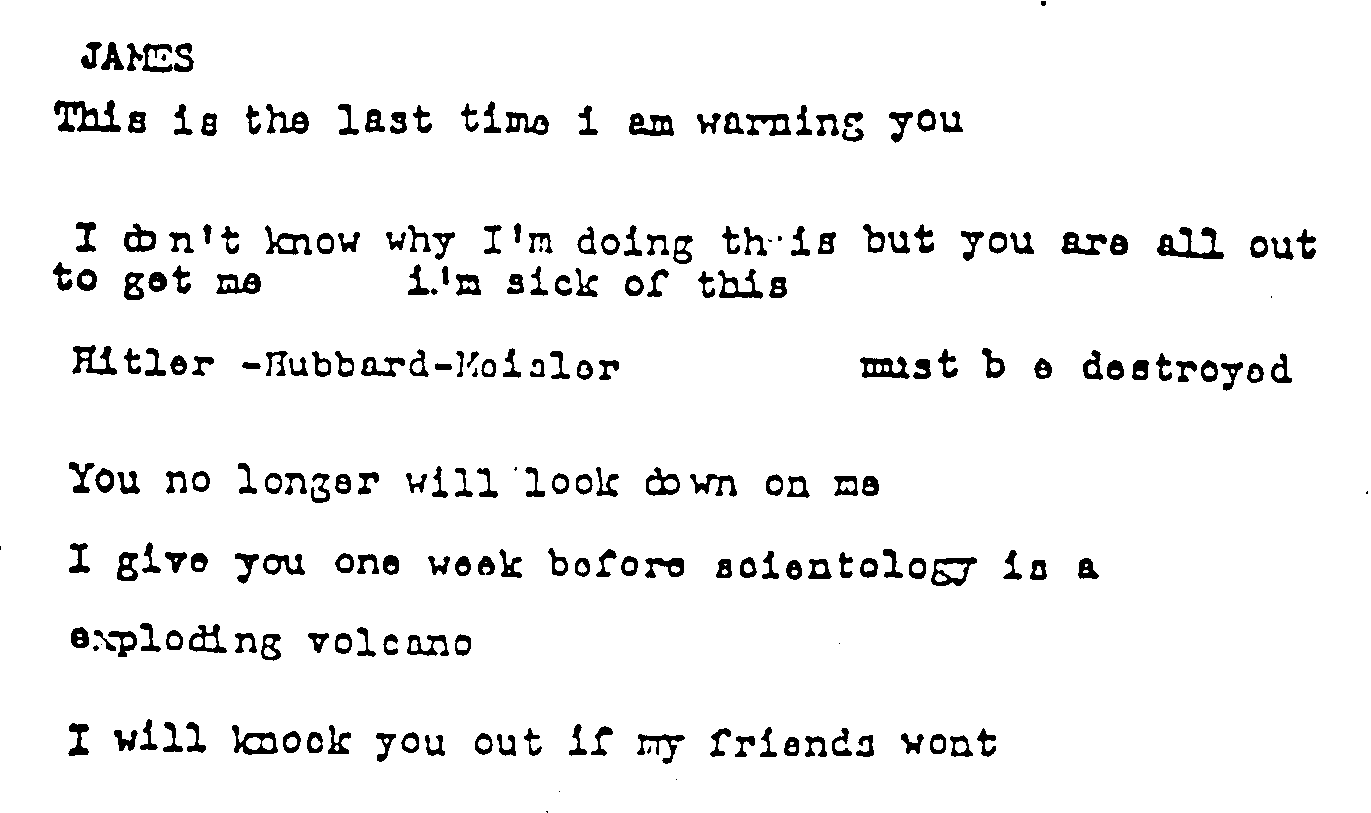
A bomb threat forged by Scientology operatives

Proponents of political or religious ideologies will sometimes use false flag tactics. This can be done to discredit or implicate rival groups, create the appearance of enemies when none exist, or create the illusion of organized and directed persecution. This can be used to gain attention and sympathy from outsiders, in particular the media, or to convince others within the group that their beliefs are under attack and in need of protection.

In retaliation for writing The Scandal of Scientology, some members of the Church of Scientology stole stationery from author Paulette Cooper's home and then used that stationery to forge bomb threats and have them mailed to a Scientology office. The Guardian's Office also had a plan for further operations to discredit Cooper known as Operation Freakout, but several Scientology operatives were arrested in a separate investigation and the plan was exposed.

According to PolitiFact, some false flag conspiracy theories (such as claims that mass shootings are hoaxes) are themselves spread by astroturfing, which is an attempt to create false impression of popularity in a belief.

== See also ==
- Agent provocateur
- Black propaganda
- Casus belli
- Denial and deception
- Fearmongering
- Fifth column
- Front organization
- Joe job, a similar online concept
- Mimicry
- Red herring
- State terrorism
- Strategy of tension
