= Mohamed Mediène =

Former head of Algerian intelligence

- Born: Mohammed Lamine Mediène; 14 May 1936 (age 90); Guenzet, Algeria
- Military career
- Allegiance: Algeria
- Branch: Algerian People's Army
- Service years: 1961–2015
- Rank: Général de corps d'armée

General Mohamed Mediène (Arabic: الجنرال محمد مدين), also known as Toufik (توفيق) is an Algerian intelligence officer who formerly served as head of the country's secret services, the Department of Intelligence and Security (Département du renseignement et de la sécurité, DRS), from 1990 to 2015. He was described as the world's longest serving "intelligence chief".

He was born in 1936 to a Kabyle family from Guenzet (Sétif Province), but grew up near Algiers at Saint-Eugene (Bologhine). He joined the National Liberation Army in 1961, a few months before the Évian Accords. He was an enlisted officer in the ALN.

== Career ==
=== Post-independence ===
Shortly after independence, he joined other ALN military members in studying at a KGB school in the Soviet Union. He was then posted to the 2nd military region (around Oran), then commanded by future President Chadli Bendjedid, where he established ties with Larbi Belkheir. In 1983, he was posted to Tripoli as military attaché. Soon after returning, he became head of presidential security for Bendjedid.

He later became head of army security in the Sécurité Militaire, led at the time by Mohamed Betchine. After Betchine's departure in 1987, Mediene was appointed general and a temporary chief of the intelligence organization. Soon after taking charge, he oversaw a reorganization of the Sécurité Militaire, and renamed it the Département du renseignement et de la sécurité (DRS).

=== Black Decade ===
At the time of the 1991 legislative election, which was won by the Islamic Salvation Front, Mediene joined a group of ruling generals in Les éradicateurs ("the Eradicator") faction. This name derives from the goal of eradicating the Islamists, as opposed to negotiating with them. This group is regarded as behind the military coup that followed the election's first round. The Eradicator faction is regarded to have gained and held power during the civil war triggered by the military coup. Since the 1992 coup, a "shadowy" group of generals and intelligence officers known to the Algerians collectively as le pouvoir (“the power”) and whose individual members are called décideurs has dominated Algerian politics with the FLN reduced down to a mere front for le pouvoir. Little is known for certain about le pouvoir, but Mediene has frequently been mentioned as a leading décideur.

During the civil war, the DRS, led by Mediene, headed efforts to repress Islamist groups. DRS agents, which reportedly number as high as 100,000, infiltrated and manipulated groups, and stopped efforts in both ruling and opposition groups to negotiate with the ISF. In 1993, he was promoted to general-major, and in July 2006, he was promoted to Lieutenant General (Général de corps d'armée.)

=== After the Black Decade ===
Although he supported President Abdelaziz Bouteflika as part of the Eradicator faction, Mediene through the DRS was later believed to be involved in a power struggle with Bouteflika. After supporting Bouteflika's first three terms, he did not support his fourth term bid, announced in January 2014. Preceding this, Ahmed Gaid Salah, the Chief of Staff of the Army and the Deputy Minister of Defense, accused the DRS of complacency in failing to prevent the In Amenas hostage crisis. And in September 2013, the DRS was reorganised to bring more of it under state control. In February 2014, the secretary general of Bouteflika's party, the FLN, accused the DRS of infiltrating and destabilizing several political parties.

Through the DRS' networks, Mediène was believed to hold significant power in Algeria's media, business lobbies, army, and different political parties. The Economist wrote in 2012 that "The most powerful man in the land may be Mohamed Mediène, known as Toufiq...". In 2013 The Economist reported: "Despite his leading role in defeating Islamic militants in a brutal civil war between 1991 and 2000, and his less public role as kingmaker in the pouvoir, General Mediene’s face remains unknown; it is said that anyone who has seen it expires soon after." A popular rumor in Algeria that cannot be verified has it that Mediène "always receives people in his office with his back turned - if you see his face, this is the last time you see someone in your life." Regardless if this rumor is true or not, the popularity of this rumor says much about Mediène's reputation in Algeria, a man widely viewed as the "Darth Vader" of Algerian politics. A popular game in Algeria is attempting to identify Mediène by examining photographs from the 1980s and 1990s of official functions to see if he can be found.

On 13 September 2015, it was announced that Mediène was retiring and President Bouteflika had appointed Athmane Tartag to succeed him. Mediène's dismissal was viewed as the culmination of a long "behind-the-scenes power struggle" with Bouteflika, leaving the latter fully in charge and giving him more power to determine his own successor.
