= Ministry of National Defense (Algeria) =

Government ministry of Algeria

Ministry of National Defence
- وزارة الدفاع الوطني
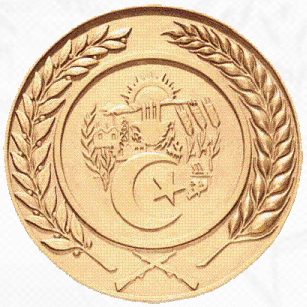
- Logo of the Ministry of National Defence

Agency overview
- Formed: 1958: Ministry of Armed Forces; 1962: Ministry of National Defence
- Jurisdiction: Government of Algeria
- Headquarters: Algiers, Algeria
- Employees: more than 400,000 employees (military, gendarmes, Republican Guards, agents, assimilated civilian personnel)
- Annual budget: 10,3 Billion $ (2013)
- Ministers responsible: Abdelmadjid Tebboune, President of the Republic, Supreme Commander of the Armed Forces, Minister of National Defence; Saïd Chengriha, Army General, Deputy Minister of National Defence, Chief of Staff of the People's National Army; Mohamed Salah Benbicha, Secretary General of the Ministry of National Defence
- Website: https://www.mdn.dz/site_principal/accueil_fr.php

The Algerian Ministry of National Defence (in Arabic: وزارة الدفاع الوطني) is the Algerian governmental administrative structure responsible for military defence policy, the organization and permanent management of the Algerian armed forces.

== Ministers of Defence ==
No.	Portrait	Name (Birth–Death)	Term of office			Political party	Cabinet(s)	Ref.
No.	Portrait	Name (Birth–Death)	Took office	Left office	Time in office	Political party	Cabinet(s)	Ref.
1		Krim Belkacem (1922–1970)	19 September 1958	18 January 1960	1 year, 121 days	National Liberation Front	Provisional Government I	
2		Houari Boumédiène (1932–1978)	27 September 1962	27 December 1978	16 years, 91 days	National Liberation Front	Bella I–II–III; Boumédiène I–II–III–IV	
3		Chadli Bendjedid (1929–2012)	8 March 1979	25 July 1990	11 years, 139 days	National Liberation Front	Abdelghani I–II–III; Brahimi I–II; Merbah; Hamrouche	
4		Khaled Nezzar (1937–2023)	25 July 1990	10 July 1993	2 years, 350 days		Hamrouche; Ghozali I–II; Abdesslam	
5		Liamine Zéroual (1941–2026)	10 July 1993	27 April 1999	5 years, 291 days	Independent	Abdesslam; Malek; Sifi I–II; Ouyahia I–II; Hamdani	
6		Abdelaziz Bouteflika (1937–2021)	17 June 2002	2 April 2019	16 years, 289 days	National Liberation Front	Benflis III; Ouyahia III–IV–V; Belkhadem I–II; Ouyahia VI–VII–VIII–IX; Sellal I–II–III–IV; Tebboune; Ouyahia X Bedoui	
—		Army corps general Ahmed Gaid Salah (1940–2019) acting	2 April 2019	19 December 2019	261 days	Independent	Bedoui	
7		Abdelmadjid Tebboune (born 1945)	19 December 2019	Incumbent	16 years, 289 days	Independent	Bedoui; Djerad I–II–III; Benabderrahmane I–II–III; Larbaoui I–II; Ghrieb	
