= Mohamed Betchine =

Algerian military officer and politician (1934–2022)

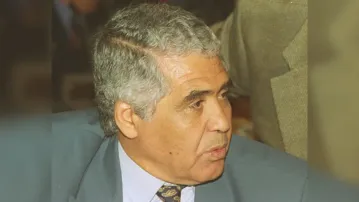
- Born: 28 November 1934; Constantine, French Algeria
- Died: 29 November 2022 (aged 88)
- Military career
- Allegiance: Algeria
- Branch: Algerian People's National Army
- Service years: 1956–1998
- Rank: General
- Conflicts: Algerian War; Algerian Civil War

Mohamed Betchine (Arabic: محمد بتشين; 28 November 1934 – 29 November 2022) was an Algerian military officer and politician who obtained the rank of general.

Betchine joined the Algerian People's National Army during the Algerian War and later directed the Algerian secret service under President Liamine Zéroual. He was also one of the founders of the Democratic National Rally. He served on the central committee of the National Liberation Front from 1979 to 1989.
