= Territorial Air Defence Forces =

Territorial Air Defence Force
- قوات الدفاع الجوي عن الإقليم (Arabic); Forces de défense aérienne du Territoire (French)
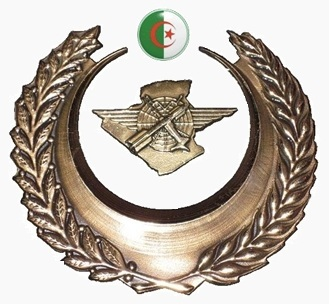
- Insignia of the Commander of the Territorial Air Defence Force
- Founded: 1988
- Country: Algeria
- Role: Air Defense
- Size: 10,000
- Part of: Algerian People's National Army

The Territorial Air Defence Force (DAT; Arabic: قوات الدفاع الجوي عن الإقليم,French: Forces de défense aérienne du Territoire) is an armed service/branch of the Algerian People's National Army, the armed forces of Algeria. It is one of the four service branches of the Algerian Armed Forces, along with the army, navy, and air force. It is tasked with the Algerian airspace protection mission. Its current commander is Major-General Amer Amrani.

The higher military school of the Air Defence Forces (école supérieure de la défense aérienne du territoire) is located at Reghaïa in Algeria's 1st Military Region. It provides engineering training.

Created in 1988, after being separated from the Ground Forces Command, it is currently under the command of the commander of air defense of the military region forces. Its equipment includes batteries of S-300s and Pantsir-S1s, and the Tor missile system. Other systems include: the SA-6 "Gainful" and Buk missile systems, the S-125 Neva/Pechora and the SA-8 Gecko, as well as the "Shilka" armed with 23 mm cannons and man portable 9K32 Strela-2s. In addition, the force possesses many types of radar.

Currently there are three air defence brigades and five surface-to-air missile regiments with SA-2, SA-3, SA-6, and SA-20.

== Equipment ==
Gear	Image	Origin	in service	Type	Comments
S-400		Russia	2 regiments	Strategic air defense SAM	Speculated to be delivered in 2021. Officially ordered in 2024 and operational by late May 2026.
S-300		Soviet Union	8 regiments	Medium-to-long-range SAM	8 regiments of S-300PMU-2 Favorit were ordered in 2006. One S-300 regiment consists of 12 launchers of 4 missiles.
Buk-M2		Soviet Union	48 systems	Medium-range SAM	
2K12		Soviet Union	Unknown	Medium-range SAM	
Pantsir-S1/SM		Russia	108	Air defense short and medium-term	
Tor M2		Soviet Union	48 systems	Short-range SAM	
9K31 Strela-1		Soviet Union	20 systems	Short-range SAM	
S-125 Neva		Soviet Union	36 S-125	Short-range SAM	

== Ranks ==
Commissioned officer ranks

Rank group	General / flag officers		Senior officers			Junior officers
Algerian Territorial Air Defence Forces
Algerian Territorial Air Defence Forces	لواء; Liwa	عميد; Amid	عقيد; Aqid	مقدم; Muqaddam	رائد; Ra'id	نقيب; Naqib	ملازم أول; Mulazim awwal	ملازم; Mulazim
Algerian Territorial Air Defence Forces	Général major	Général	Colonel	Lieutenant-colonel	Commandant	Capitaine	Lieutenant	Sous-lieutenant

Other ranks

Rank group	Senior NCOs				Junior NCOs		Enlisted
Algerian Territorial Air Defence Forces							No insignia
Algerian Territorial Air Defence Forces	مساعد أول; Mosa'id awwal	مساعد; Mosa'id	رقيب أول; Raqib awwal	رقيب; Raqib	عريف أول; Earif 'awal	عريف; Earif	جندي; Jundiun
Algerian Territorial Air Defence Forces	Adjudant chef	Adjudant	Sergent chef	Sergent	Caporal chef	Caporal	Djoundi
