= Saïd Chengriha =

Algerian military officer

- سعيد شنقريحة
- Chengriha in 2026

Chief of Staff of the People's National Army
- Incumbent
- Assumed office 23 December 2019
- Preceded by: Ahmed Gaid Salah

Commander of Ground Forces
- In office 20 September 2018 – 17 March 2020

Personal details
- Born: 1 August 1945 (age 81) El Kantara, Algeria

Military service
- Allegiance: Algeria
- Branch/service: Algerian People's National Army
- Rank: Army general
- Battles/wars: Six-Day War; Yom Kippur War

Saïd Chengriha (Note: also romanized as Chanegriha) (Arabic: سعيد شنقريحة; born 1 August 1945) is a senior official in the Algerian People's National Army. He was the commander of the ground forces in September 2018 and was named acting chief of staff after the death of Ahmed Gaid Salah on 23 December 2019 until 3 July 2020 when he was officially appointed by president Abdelmadjid Tebboune. In November 2024, General Chengriha joined the Tebboune government as delegate for national defense.

== Military service ==
After graduating from Saint-Cyr Military Academy, Chengriha took part in the Six-Day War in 1967 and the Yom Kippur War in 1973. He then attended the Voroshilov Academy. He has received a number of awards, including the PNA 1st, 2nd and 3rd chevron medals, Medal of the PNA participation in the middle-east wars 1967 and 1973, Medal of Military Merit, Medal of Honor and the Medal of Bravery of the PNA. He was promoted to the rank of brigadier general in 1998, to major general in 2003, to army corps general in 2020 and then to army general in 2022 by president Tebboune, on the occasion of the 60th anniversary of the Algerian independence.

== Personal life ==
Chengriha is married and has six children.
