= Mohamed Samraoui =

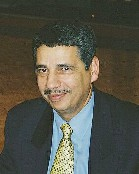
Mohamed Samraoui

Mohamed Samraoui (born 1953) is a former member of the Algerian secret services (Intelligence and Security Directorate, DRS) who wrote a book claiming that the DRS had been involved in torture and extralegal killings, and had manipulated the Armed Islamic Groups on a large scale to commit further massacres.

== Biography ==
He joined the Algerian army in July 1974. After studying biochemistry and going through officer training, he became an instructor at a Military Security school (Sécurité Militaire (SM), the army's secret service) at Beni-Messous, and rose through the SM's ranks, moving to various towns as his postings changed. From March 1990 to July 1992, he worked in Algiers in the counterespionage bureau, as well as becoming part of the state of emergency administration from 1991 on. In 1992, he asked to resign, but was not permitted to do so; instead, he accepted a posting to the Algerian embassy in Germany as military attaché and advisor, eventually reaching the position of Lt. Colonel in the DRS. In 1995, he reports that he was asked by Smaine Lamari to assassinate two FIS leaders abroad, Abdelbaki Sahraoui and Rabah Kebir. On 12 February 1996, he left his post and sought political asylum in Germany. In 2003, he published a book, Chronique des années de sang, attributing a variety of misdeeds, including the majority of the assassinations and massacres attributed to Islamists, to the Algerian secret services in the course of the Algerian Civil War.

On 22 October 2007, Samraoui was arrested by Spanish police whilst attending a meeting in the town of Benalmádena in Southern Spain. It is believed that the arrest was in response to a request from Interpol that had come from the Algerian authorities. Samraoui is currently under conditional release in Spain awaiting the outcome of the extradition request presented by the Algerian authorities. He was not allowed to return to his home and family in Germany whilst this request was being dealt with by the Spanish judicial system. However, in early December 2007 Samraoui decided to return to Germany claiming that he had been warned that he could be in danger if he remained in Spain.

Samraoui is a correspondence chess player and received the chess title of Senior International Correspondence Chess Master in 2003. He was the President of International Correspondence Chess Federation from 2005-2008.
