= People's National Army (Algeria) =

Combined military forces of Algeria

- الجيش الوطني الشعبي
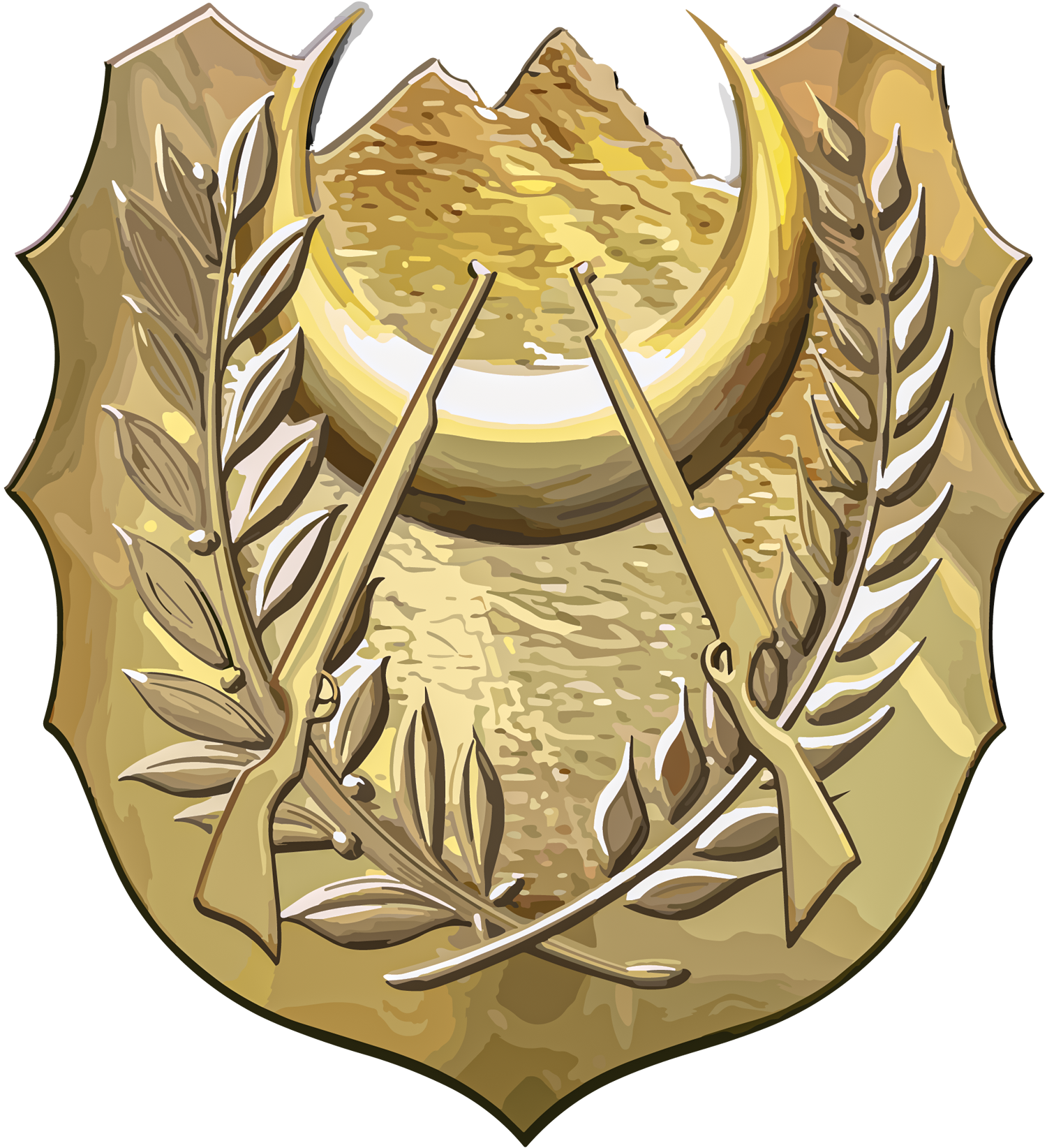
- People's National Army emblem
- Founded: 1954 (as National Liberation Army)
- Current form: 1962
- Service branches: Algerian Land Forces; Algerian National Navy; Algerian Air Force; Territorial Air Defence Forces; National Gendarmerie; Republican Guard
- Headquarters: Algiers

Leadership
- Supreme Commander of the Armed Forces and Minister of National Defence: President Abdelmadjid Tebboune
- Chief of Staff of the PNA and Deputy Minister of National Defence: Army General Saïd Chengriha

Personnel
- Conscription: Yes
- Active personnel: 130,000
- Reserve personnel: 150,000

Expenditure
- Budget: DZD 3.208 trillion ($25 billion) (2025-2026)

Industry
- Domestic suppliers: Military Industry of Central Direction; SNVI; ECMK-K; ENIM; BCL; ECM-R; SCAFSE
- Foreign suppliers: China; Italy; United States; Germany; Russia

Related articles
- History: Military history of Algeria; Algerian War of Independence; Sand War; Socialist Forces Front rebellion in Algeria; Six-Day War; Yom Kippur War; Western Sahara War; Algerian Civil War; Insurgency in the Maghreb; ISIL insurgency in Tunisia
- Ranks: Military ranks of Algeria

The People's National Army (PNA; Arabic: الجيش الوطني الشعبي الجزائري, romanized: al-Jaysh al-Waṭanī al-Shaʿbī al-Jazāʾirī) is the military of Algeria. It is the direct successor of the National Liberation Army (ALN), the armed wing of the nationalist National Liberation Front (FLN), which fought French colonial rule during the Algerian War (1954–1962).

The People's National Army include the Algerian Land Forces, the Algerian Air Force, the Navy, and the Territorial Air Defence Forces. The antecedents of the army were the conventional military units formed in neighbouring Morocco and Tunisia during the war of independence from France.

== History ==
=== Role in politics ===
The Algerian military elite has played a dominating role in Algerian politics ever since independence in 1962, when the army emerged as the only effective powerbroker in a shattered political landscape characterized by weak and competing political factions. At the end of the war of independence, a split developed between the National Liberation Army and the Provisional Government of the Algerian Republic (GPRA). The GPRA was set up in 1958 to represent the National Liberation Front abroad, mobilise the funds needed to organise the underground movement and support the refugees who had fled to Morocco and Tunisia. But it was the general staff of the ALN that was actually in charge of the revolution. When the war ended, it "dismissed" the GPRA and took over the running of the new state.

After independence in 1962, the Army, led by Houari Boumediène, backed Ahmed Ben Bella to become president. Recognizing the role that the military played in bringing him to power, Ben Bella appointed senior officers as ministers and other important positions within the new state, including naming Boumediène as the defence minister.

Just three years later, Boumediène deposed Ben Bella in a coup, which also saw the former take power and the National Assembly replaced by the Revolutionary Council to oversee the development of state structures. The council was set up by 26 military officers, including Chadli Bendjedid and Abdelaziz Bouteflika, and it gradually entrenched the military establishment as the founders and the backbone of the Algerian regime. Despite the influence of the army that time was limited due to state and army leadership were joined under Boumediène's highly authoritarian presidency, after his death in 1978, the role of the military in politics started to grow from the late 1970s. The Ministry of Defence took over administrative control of the government after Boumediène fell ill. After Boumediène's death in 1978, the military ensured the continuation of its influence in politics by choosing Colonel Chadli Benjedid to succeed as the President, as he increasingly relied on the a small number of military advisers for advice. Despite this, factionalization and rivalries within the military and political élites remains a major factor in Algerian politics.

After being structured as a politicized "people's army" in the Boumédiène era, and retaining its allegiance to the FLN during the one-party state years of Algerian history, the military forces were formally depoliticized in 1988, as a multi-party system was introduced. This, however, did not end military influence over Algerian politics. It was extremely suspicious of Islamist parties, such as the Islamic Salvation Front (FIS), and opposed the FIS's legal recognition in 1989. Since most of the officers were trained overseas in states practicing secular laws, such as France and the Soviet Union, they believe Islamism was a threat to state foundations and a threat to the military's interests. This was reflected in decisions by army chiefs to ban the hijab and its reluctance to support Iraq during its invasion of Kuwait.

In 1991, fearing Algeria becoming an Islamic state governed by strict Sharia law, the Algerian Army cancelled free elections that were likely to bring an Islamist party, the Islamic Salvation Front (FIS) to power. They also launched a coup d'état in January 1991 and forced Bendjedid to resign the presidency. For many officers, the election of an Islamist Algerian government would be a disaster as they believed it would be catastrophic for the economy through capital flight and foreign petrol companies cancelling their agreements to extract oil and gas in Algeria. Politically, the military believed the election of the FIS could bring instability to the country, as there were indications that the FIS's opponents are preparing to start armed conflicts against any future Islamist governments. Despite Benjedid assured the officers that he could keep the FIS in check with his constitutional and institutional powers, the military were still suspicious, as they doubted Benjedid's ability to exercise such powers and feared he might compromise with the FIS to maintain his position, including sacking senior personnel. The coup and the cancellation of elections triggered the Algerian Civil War in December 1991, a conflict which is believed to have claimed 100–350,000 lives during the 1990s. During the war, both the armed forces and Islamist insurgents have been severely criticized by outside observers for their conduct of the war on humanitarian and human rights grounds. The state and army suppressed Islamist resistance in the late 1990s, but local and sporadic fighting persists in 2009, along with occasional bomb attacks against government targets in major cities. The most active insurgent group is al-Qaeda in the Islamic Maghreb (AQIM), formerly known as GSPC. Since major fighting subsided in about 1997, the army has been engaged in refitting itself for the tasks of a conventional army, after more than a decade of anti-guerrilla action.

Over Boutiflika's 20-year-presidency, the military's influence over politics decreased, as commanders who once held strong political power started to retire, and Boutiflika himself secured more mandate from the people, as his foreign policies rejuvenated Algeria's international status and domestic policies were successful in achieving reconciliation between different sides of the civil war and achieving peace.

However, the military still has a role in Algerian politics. This was displayed during the Algerian protests that forced Bouteflika to resign from office in 2019, after losing support of the military, which Chief of Staff of the military, General Ahmed Gaid Salah, demanded that he be declared unfit for office and be removed immediately.

=== Border disputes ===
The major part of Algeria's armed forces are directed towards the country's western border with Morocco and Western Sahara. Algeria supported the guerrilla Western Sahara War (1975–1991) against Moroccan control of Western Sahara by the Polisario Front, a national liberation movement of Sahrawi Bedouin exiled in Algeria's Tindouf Province. Algeria has had longstanding border disagreements with Morocco, due to the non-recognition of the colonial borders by the Moroccan regime. Although now basically resolved, these continue to linger as a factor in the consistently troubled but generally non-violent relations between the two neighboring states. The Algeria-Morocco border has been closed since 1994. Both countries' armed forces have engaged in costly equipment upgrades in recent years, clearly viewing each other as the principal threat to their sovereignty, and equally reluctant to let the other nation gain the upper hand militarily.

By contrast, Algeria's post-independence border disagreements with Tunisia and Libya, which were at times a cause for poor relations, both appear to have been peacefully resolved (to its advantage). The Algerian army has also, especially in later years, been very active along the Algeria-Mali border, where various insurgent movements are based. Algeria has fought only two brief wars and battles after independence (the Sand War, a border conflict with Morocco in 1963 and the First battle of Amgala in 1976), but the country is also, like most Arab nations, formally at war with Israel since 1948.

In 1984, after promoting eight colonels to become the first generals in independent Algeria, Chadli Benjedid announced the establishment of an ANP general staff. Previously, the armed forces had relied on the secretary general of the Ministry of National Defence to coordinate staff activities. The previous secretary general of the ministry, Major General Mostefa Belloucif, was named the first chief of staff. Belloucif had risen quickly in the ANP and was also an alternate member of the FLN Political Bureau. However, he was dismissed in 1986 without explanation; in 1992 the regime announced that Benloucif would be tried for corruption and the embezzlement of US$11 million, which had been transferred to European accounts.

Bouteflika sought to reassert the power of the presidency over the largely autonomous armed forces. As Minister of Defence, he nominated new commanders for military regions in August 2004. He also issued a presidential decree creating the position of General Secretary within the Ministry of Defence. Nevertheless, current and retired officers—"le pouvoir"—remain important decision-makers. In order to encourage Algerian military reforms, the U.S. decided to allow Algeria to receive International Military Education and Training (IMET) funds.

Algeria has the largest defence budget in Africa. Historically, Algeria bought weapons and military equipment from the Soviet Union. United Press International reported in March 2013 that Algeria was undergoing a process of military modernization, which includes the introduction of new, more modern warships, aircraft, and tanks.

On 19 January 2013, Algerian troops killed 32 militant hostage-takers and freed more than 650 hostages held at the Tigantourine gas facility, situated near in Amenas in the Illizi Province. Nearly 48 hostages are confirmed to be dead. The kidnappers said the assault on the gas plant was launched in retaliation for French intervention against Islamist groups in neighboring Mali.

== Composition ==
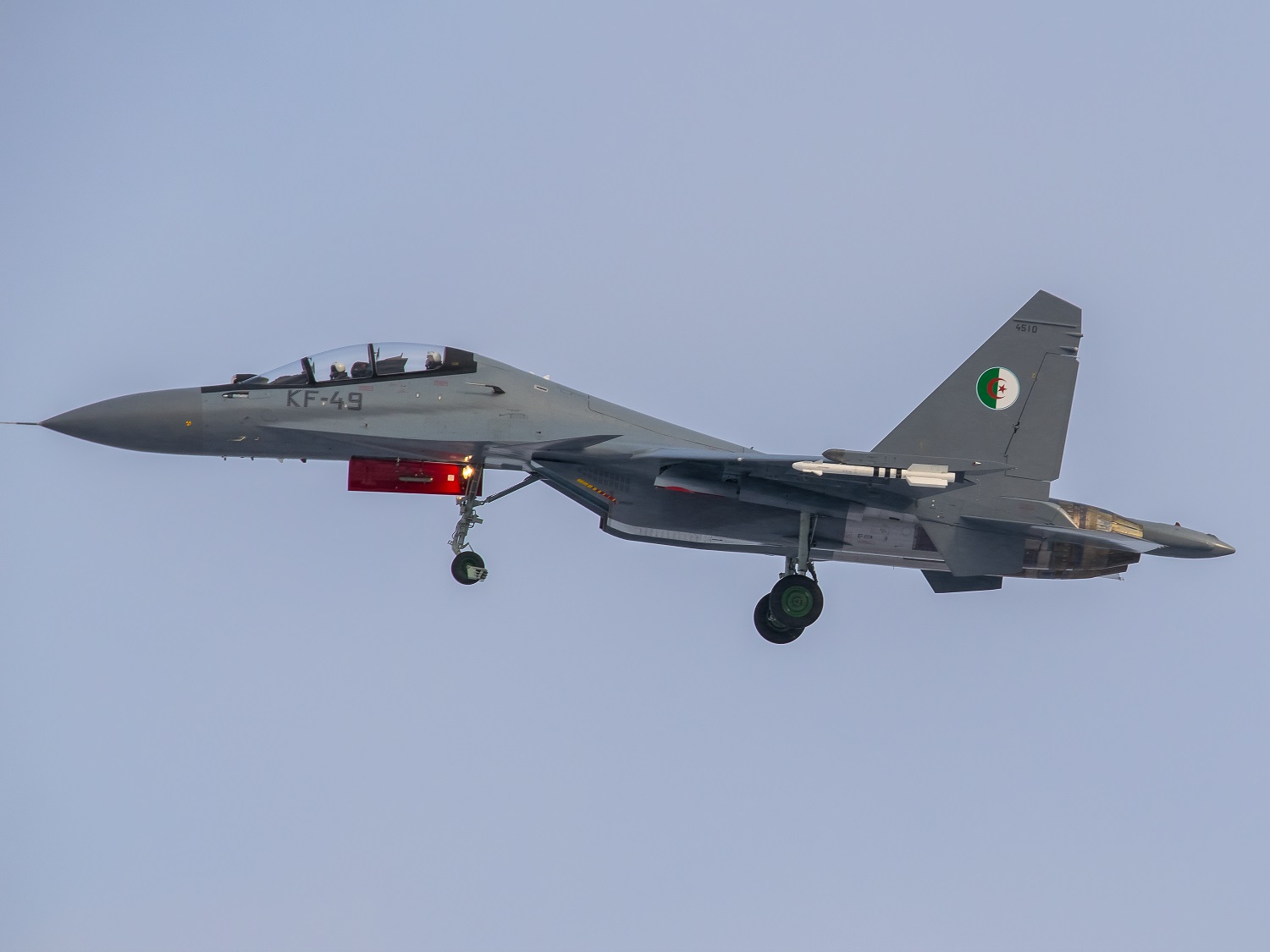
An Algerian Sukhoi Su-30 fighter

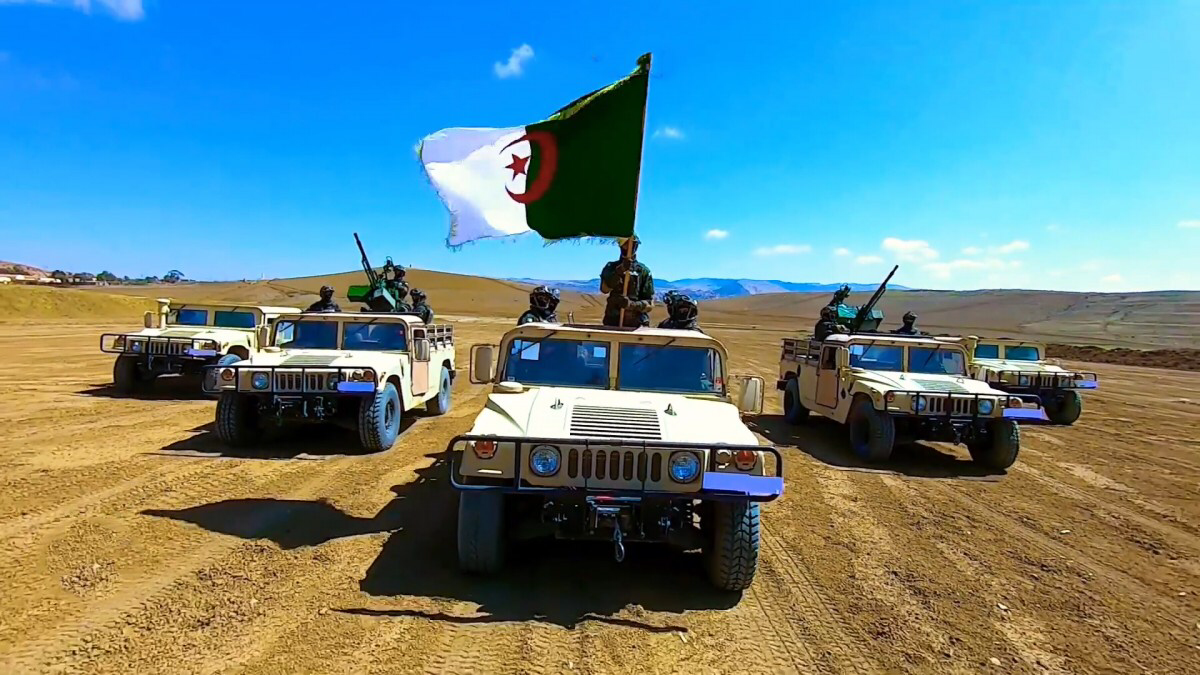
Algerian soldiers mounted on some Humveess

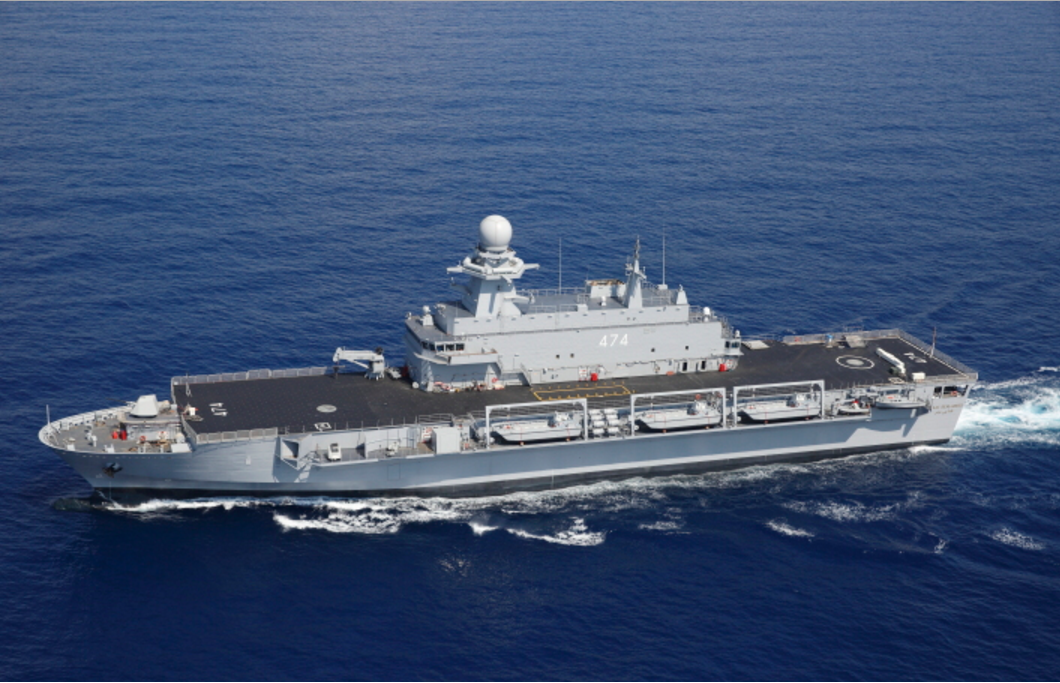
Amphibious assault ship of type LPD Kalaat Béni Abbès, flagship of the Algerian fleet

The army is under the control of the president, who also is the minister of National Defence. The U.S. Central Intelligence Agency estimated that military expenditures accounted for some 6% of GDP in 2019.

Before 1984, the armed forces had relied on the secretary general of the Ministry of National Defence to coordinate staff activities. That year, Chadli Bendjedid announced the establishment of an ANP general staff. The general staff had responsibility for operational planning for the integrated armed forces, budgeting, information and communications, logistics and administrative support, mobilization, and recruiting. It was not, however, part of the regular chain of command. In practice, the armed forces chief of staff dealt directly with the chiefs of the service branches and with the commanders of the six military regions. Along with the minister of defence (Nezzar in 1993), Helen Chapin Metz wrote in 1993 that the senior hierarchy of the armed forces included the Chief of Staff of the People's National Army, Abdelmalek Guénaizia; the commander of the National Gendarmerie, Abbas Ghezaiel; the chief of the DRS, Mohamed Médiène; and the inspector general of the land forces, Tayeb Derradji.

In October 2013 Jeune Afrique predicted the recreation of an inspectorate of the armed forces, possibly to be headed by General Ben Ali Ben Ali.

The armed forces comprise:

- Algerian Land Forces (270,000 in 2012), operating T-90S tanks, and other vehicles, as well as Iskander-E ballistic missiles, BMPT Terminator and BMPT-62. Their standard-issue rifle is a Chinese variant of the AK-47/AKM.
- Algerian National Navy (MRA) (est. 30,000 in 2012), operating MEKO A200 frigates, Kilo-class submarines, heavy C-28A stealth corvettes and other vessels.
- Algerian Air Force (AAF) (14,000 in 2012, this figure included AD numbers), operating Su-30MKAs, MiG-25, MiG-29 and other aircraft.
- Territorial Air Defence Forces (Defense aerienne du territoire) (8,000 in 2012) (3 brigades, 3 regiments with SA-2/3/6/20, 725 AA guns) 8 system S-300 (missile), 4 system S-400 (missile), 24 batteries tor M2, 108 Pantsir-S1/SM and 48 Buk M2. 40 SA-6 were reported in service in 2012.

The army was in the process of being reorganized into four divisions in 1993, and also has numerous independent brigades and battalions. There are seven military regions, the seventh being added in 2013. The 6th Military Region was created in 1975 to cover the south, and the 7th Military Region in 2013. Regular military forces are composed of conscripts; all Algerian men are required to do a year of military service.

Military intelligence, recognized to have played a major political role, was long called Sécurité militaire (Military Security, SM) but reorganized in the late 1980s and early 1990s into Département du Renseignement et de la Sécurité (Department of Intelligence and Security, DRS). The DRS and its counter-espionage branch, DCE, was a leading role in the fight against the Islamist insurgency of the 1990s through a number of its own special forces units, as well as by establishing joint task force commands which assumed control over specialized military and police units.

Since 2016 the DRS has been dissolved and the new Algerian intelligence service is the "Direction des services de sécurités" (DSS).

Military forces are supplemented by a 150,000-member National Gendarmerie (Gendarmerie Nationale), a paramilitary body, which is used mainly as a police force in rural areas. The 200,000-member Sûreté nationale or metropolitan police force is under the Ministry of the Interior.

Algeria is one of four Saharan states which will create a Joint Military Staff Committee, to be based at Tamanrasset in southern Algeria. Algeria, Mauritania, Niger, and Mali will take part. Mortimer wrote that '..In March 2010, the Centre d'Etat-Major commun Opérationel Conjoint (CEMOC) was established'. A later report said the committee had a secretariat with four staff sections: operations, intelligence, logistics, and communications.

== Equipment ==
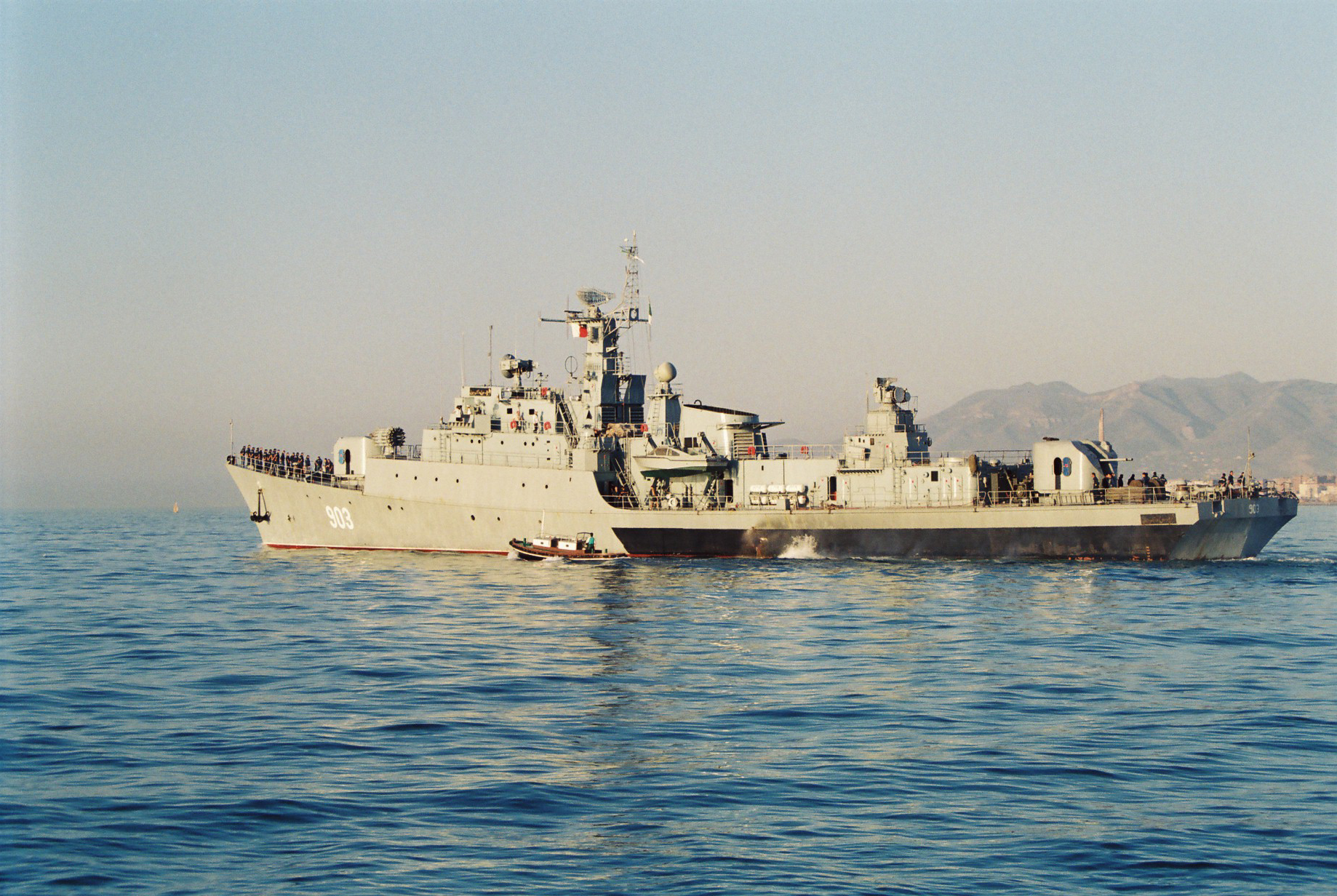
The Russian made Rais Korfou frigate

Algeria's primary military suppliers have been the former Soviet Union, which sold various types of sophisticated equipment under military trade agreements, and the People's Republic of China. Since independence in the 1960s, no foreign bases are known to have been allowed in Algeria, although in the 1970s and 1980s, large numbers of Soviet military advisers were stationed in the country. Since 2001, security cooperation with the United States has increased, and US forces have taken part in training missions in the country's Saharan south.

Another weapons supplier of Algeria is France. France and Algeria have had a significant connection since the French Algeria colonial era, as France supplies weapons and armor to Algerian forces. As of October 2009, it was reported that Algeria canceled a weapons deal with France over the presence of Israeli parts.

Four or eight battalions of Russian S-300PMU2 long-range anti-aircraft missiles were ordered in 2006. In 2006, multibillion-dollar purchases of Russian military equipment were made in order to upgrade the country's conventional arsenal. This included a deal by the Algerian Air Force to buy 28 Su-30MKA and 36 MiG-29SMT for up to $3.5 billion. However, those MiG-29s were returned to Russia in February 2008 because of poor airframe quality, after technical evaluations in Algeria. In May 2008 the two governments agreed on a new deal to replace those 36 MiG-29SMT by a new batch of 16 Su-30MKA which meet all requirements of Algerian Air Force.

Algeria also has a small domestic military industry of its own. The army produces AK-47 and AKM-47 assault rifles, licensed by Russia and China, as well as rocket-type RPGs in the Construction Company Mechanical Khenchela (ECMK).

Moreover, the ECMK also builds under license the UAE Caracal pistol. The logistics base station produces various types of AICV (Armoured Infantry Fighting Vehicle) for the transport of troops and light armored vehicles. The air force produces two types of light aircraft for the basic training and has produced its own reconnaissance drone since December 2010. The Russian company, Rosoboronexport, has expressed a request for financial assistance to several countries including Algeria, Iran, Saudi Arabia, and the UAE to participate in the project for the production of the T-50 (PAK-FA) 5th generation fighter aircraft.

=== Military industry ===
Starting in 2021 the Algerian T-62 fleet underwent a unique homemade upgrade, turning the vehicle from an MBT into a fire-support vehicle by replacing the old turret with a Berezhok combat turret containing a PKT, a 30 mm autocannon, four Kornet ATGMs and a teleoperated AGS-30 grenade launcher. This new format has been likened to a "Mini-Terminator" or a "BMPT-62".

Algeria also has a military industrial company called the Military Industry of Central Direction, which produces military arms, vehicles, weapons, ships, jets, helicopters, tanks, and other equipment. It was founded in 1998.

The military industry of Algeria dates back to 1980, when Algeria needed to diversify and sought to have its own national equipment so as to be less reliant on weapons imported from the Soviet Union and France. The development of the military industry in Algeria in the 1980s played a crucial role when the Algerian Civil War occurred a decade later. The indigenously manufactured weapons helped the Algerian military in combating the Islamists around the country, contributing to the government's victory in 2002.

Algeria exports its indigenously manufactured weapons to Tunisia, Mali, Niger, Libya, Mauritania and several other African as well as Arab states in the Middle East.

Since 2017 the Société Algérienne de Fabrication de Véhicules de Marque Mercedes Benz (SAFAV-MB) supplied the Algerian armed and security forces with several types of Mercedes-Benz vehicles like the Mercedes-Benz Unimog, Zetros, Sprinter, Actros, G-class...

Additionally, all of these vehicles are made in Algeria with the vehicles of the "Société Nationale des Véhicules Industrielles" (SNVI).

== See also ==
- List of wars involving Algeria
- Algeria military ranks
- Defense industry of Algeria
- Special forces of Algeria
- Garde communale
