= Ahmed Gaid Salah =

Algerian military officer (1940–2019)

Lieutenant general Ahmed Gaid Salah
- أحمد قايد صالح
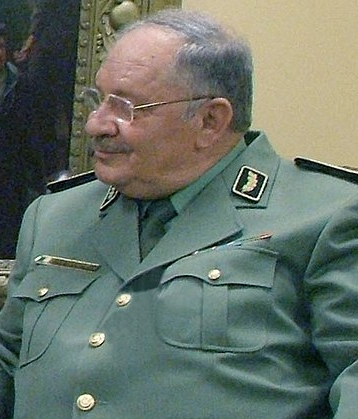
- Ahmed Gaid Salah in 2006

Chief of Staff of the People's National Army
- In office 3 August 2004 – 23 December 2019
- President: Abdelaziz Bouteflika; Abdelmadjid Tebboune
- Preceded by: Mohamed Lamari
- Succeeded by: Saïd Chengriha

Deputy Minister of Defense
- In office 11 September 2013 – 23 December 2019
- Preceded by: Abdelmalek Guenaizia
- Succeeded by: Saïd Chengriha (2024)

Commander of Ground Forces
- In office 1994 – 3 August 2004
- Preceded by: Khelifa Rahim
- Succeeded by: Ahcene Tafer

Personal details
- Born: 13 January 1940 Batna, French Algeria
- Died: 23 December 2019 (aged 79) Algiers, Algeria

Military service
- Allegiance: FLN (1957–1962); Algeria (1962–2019)
- Branch/service: Algerian People's National Army
- Years of service: 1957–2019
- Rank: Lieutenant general
- Unit: Corps of Artillery
- Commands: Chief of Staff of the People's National Army
- Battles/wars: Algerian War; Sand War; War of Attrition; Western Sahara War; Algerian Civil War

Ahmed Gaid Salah (Arabic: أحمد قايد صالح; 13 January 1940 – 23 December 2019) was an Algerian military officer and chief of staff of the Algerian People's National Army from 2004 to 2019. In 2004, he was appointed by then-President Abdelaziz Bouteflika to the position of chief of staff of the army. On 15 September 2013, he was appointed Deputy Minister of Defense. Gaid Salah served as Algeria's de facto leader in 2019.

== Biography ==
On 26 March 2019, after months of unrelenting anti-Bouteflika protests, Gaid Salah compelled President Bouteflika to resign. The president handed over his resignation under intense public pressure after having announced that he was seeking reelection for a fifth term. Later, in an effort to ease public tension, General Gaid Salah ordered the arrest of the president's brother and close adviser, Said Bouteflika, alleging that he was conspiring with two former intelligence chiefs, retired General Toufik Mediene and General Tartag, to make changes in the leadership of the armed forces, including the removal of Gaid Salah himself from his top position.

In an effort to remove opposition, General Gaid Salah ordered the arrest of two former prime ministers as well as other former ministers and several business leaders who were close to presidential advisor Said Bouteflika. His actions at that point gained him a lot of public support. The anti-corruption activity that started in the second quarter of 2019 was used by the Algerian anti-government movement as an opportunity to demand that the military hand over power to a civilian government, a demand that was rejected by General Gaid Salah. Instead, General Gaid Salah said that only a presidential election could bring the country out of its political crisis.

== Death ==
Gaid Salah suffered a heart attack on the morning of 23 December 2019 and was rushed to a military hospital in Algiers, where he died a few hours later. He was 79 years old. His last public appearance was four days earlier when he received the National Order of Merit from President Abdelmadjid Tebboune. After his funeral, he was buried on 25 December 2019 at El-Alia cemetery, Algiers.

== Honours ==
- Collar of the National Order of Merit (Algeria)
- Medal of the Order of Military Merit (Algeria)
- Medal of Bravery (Algeria)
- Medal of Courage (Algeria)
- Medal of Honour (Algeria)
- Medal of Longevity and Exemplary Service (Algeria)
- Medal for participation in the Middle East Wars 1967 and 1973 (Algeria)
- Commander of the Order of the Republic of Tunisia
