= Department of Intelligence and Security (DRS) =

Algerian state intelligence service

Agency overview
- Formed: September 1958
- Dissolved: March 2016
- Headquarters: Algiers, Algeria
- Annual budget: Classified

The Department of Intelligence and Security (DRS) (Arabic: دائرة الاستعلام والأمن) (French: Département du Renseignement et de la Sécurité) was the Algerian state intelligence service. Its existence dates back to the struggle for independence.

In 2016, it was dissolved by President Abdelaziz Bouteflika and replaced by the Direction des services de sécurité.

== History ==
=== MALG (1958–1962) ===
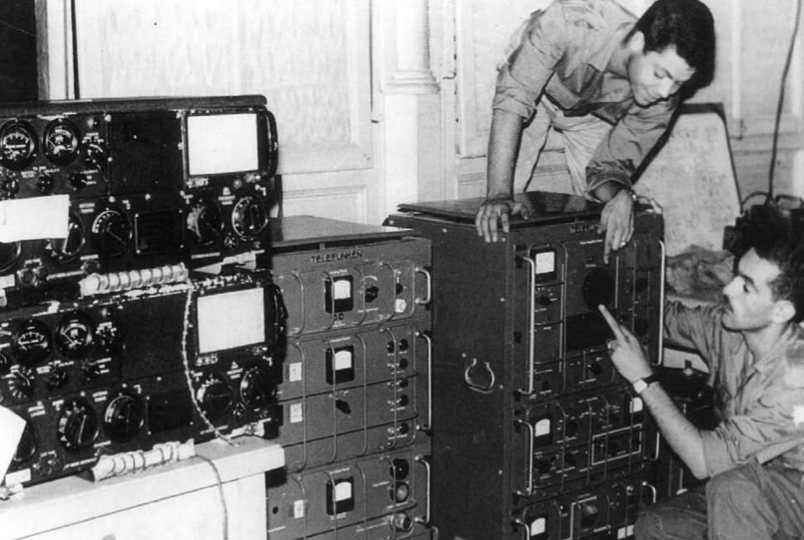
Members of the National Communications department (DTN) of MALG

The DRS was formed as the Ministère de l'Armement et des Liaisons générales (MALG) during the Algerian War for independence, under the direction by Abdelhafid Boussouf, whose role was to lead both the national and international networks of the Front de libération nationale (FLN). After independence in 1962, and particularly with the accession of Houari Boumédiène to the leadership of the country in 1965, the Algerian intelligence services greatly professionalised and institutionalised.

MALG was organized under five departments :

1. DTN: National Communications department
2. DDR: Documentation and Research department, responsible for military research
3. DVCR: Vigilance and Counter Intelligence
4. DLG: Army post network
5. Management of logistics for acquiring, storing, and routing weapons and equipment.

=== Sécurité Militaire (1962–1990) ===
This change of internal organization was modeled to a large extent on the intelligence and internal security services of the then Eastern bloc Nations. Renamed Sécurité Militaire, 'Military Security', its directives were:

- Counter-espionage
- Internal security
- Foreign intelligence

The first appointed Chairman of Military Security was the colonel Kasdi Merbah who stayed until the death of president Boumédiène in 1978. Then he was succeeded for a short time by colonel Yazid Zerhouni. President Chadli Bendjedid, who mistrusted the SM, dismantled it and renamed it the DGPS. Chadli appointed to the chair of the DGPS general Lakehal Ayat, reorganising the agency to work solely in foreign intelligence.

=== DRS (1990–2016) ===
The riots and turmoil of October 1988 caused president Chadli Bendjedid to dismiss General Ayat, who was succeeded by General Betchine. His tenure saw major political change, beginning with the advent of a multi-party political system and the rise of the Islamist movement of the FIS. Betchine was then replaced by Mohamed Mediène in November 1990, who served until 2015. Following this, the Services changed its name once again, from DGPS to DRS. Outside observers have charged that Mediène was one of the junta of generals who forced the cancellation the 1991 elections which the Islamists were set to win, plunging the nation into a war against the Islamist, and greatly increasing the power of the military—and the DRS—in Algeria's government.

It was in this period that the DRS reasserted its role in internal security, becoming an active player in the Algerian Civil War of the 1990s. It reportedly had as many as 100,000 agents that infiltrated many segments of society. DRS agents infiltrated and manipulated terrorist groups, and repressed different Islamist groups. It also blocked negotiations both by the ruling and opposition powers with the FIS.

In September 2013, the DRS was reorganized to bring more of its power under the state's control. In 2016, it was dissolved entirely and replaced.

== Chairmen of the DRS ==
- Abdelhafid Boussouf from 1954 to 1958
- Houari Boumédiène from 1958 to 1965
- Kasdi Merbah from 1965 to 1978
- Yazid Zerhouni from 1979 to 1981
- Lakehal Ayat from 1981 to 1988
- Mohamed Betchine from 1988 to 1990
- Mohamed Mediène from 1990 to 2015
- Athmane Tartag since 2015 to 2019
