= Marine Fusilier Regiments =

Regiments of the Algerian Navy

- الفوج الأول للرماة البحرين; Al-Fawj al'awal Lilrumat al-Bahriiyn
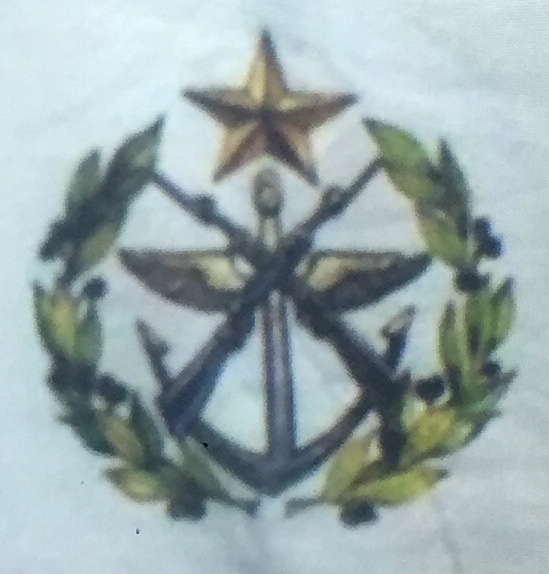
- Active: 1985-today
- Country: Algeria
- Allegiance: Algerian Army
- Branch: Algerian Navy
- Type: Naval infantry
- Role: Amphibious warfare Quick reaction force

Marine Fusilier Regiments (RFM or Marine Rifle Regiments) in Arabic: الفوج الأول للرماة البحرين, romanized: Al-Fawj al-Awal Lilrumat al-Bahriiyn are marine infantry regiments belonging to the Algerian Navy.

They are the Algerian equivalents of the USMC.

== History ==
The first Marine Rifle Battalions were created in 1986, the officer behind the creation of these units was General Abdelmadjid Chérif.

The Marine Riflemen, like the Parachute Commandos of the Algerian Land Forces, are recognised as elite units of the Algerian Army. Moreover, following the creation of these units, the Navy wanted to have a landing force that could operate in amphibious zones and that could lead to an operation in depth like their parachute counterparts in the Army.

The Marine Riflemen are also a rapid-action and specialised operations force, they are fully autonomous and have their own logistics, combat and support capabilities.

However, it was in 2005 that the Marine Commandos Corps was created with the release of its first class.

== Organization ==
The Marine Rifle Regiments have an organization quite similar to their Parachute Commando counterparts in the Algerian Land Forces.

There are currently 8 identified Marine Rifle Regiments:

- 1st Marine Fusiliers Regiment "Martyr Housh Mohamed" of Jijel (الفوج الأول للرماة البحريين "الشهيد حوش محمد Al-Fawj Al'awal Lilrumat al-Bahriiyn "Al-Shahid Housh Mohamed)
- 3rd Marine Fusiliers Regiment of Azzefoun (الفوج الأول للرماة البحريين Al-Fawj Al'awal Lilrumat al-Bahriiyn)
- 4th Marine Fusiliers Regiment of El Milia (الفوج الرابع للرماة البحريين Al-Fawj al'rrabie Lilrumat al-Bahriiyn)
- 5th Marine Fusiliers Regiment of Ténès (الفوج الأول للرماة البحريين Al-Fawj Al'awal Lilrumat al-Bahriiyn)
- 7th Marine Fusiliers Regiment of Boumerdes (الفوج الأول للرماة البحريين Al-Fawj Al'awal Lilrumat al-Bahriiyn)
- ?? Marine Fusiliers Regiment of Dellys (الفوج الأول للرماة البحريين Al-Fawj Al'awal Lilrumat al-Bahriiyn)
- ?? Marine Fusiliers Regiment of Mers-El-Kebir (الف وج الأول للرماة البحريين Al-Fawj Al'awal Lilrumat al-Bahriiyn)
- 12th Coastal Artillery Regiment of Collo "Martyr Ferendi Mohamed" ( الفوج 12 للمدفعية الساحلية الشهيد فرندي محمد Al-Fawj 12 Lilmadfaeiat al-Sahiliat "al-Shahid Ferendi Mohamed)

== The operational organization ==
The Marine Rifle Regiments are organized like all the regiments of the Algerian Army:

- 1 General staff
- 3 Fighting companies
- 1 Logistics company
- 1 Anti-tank company
- 1 Recognition and support company
- 1 Transmission company

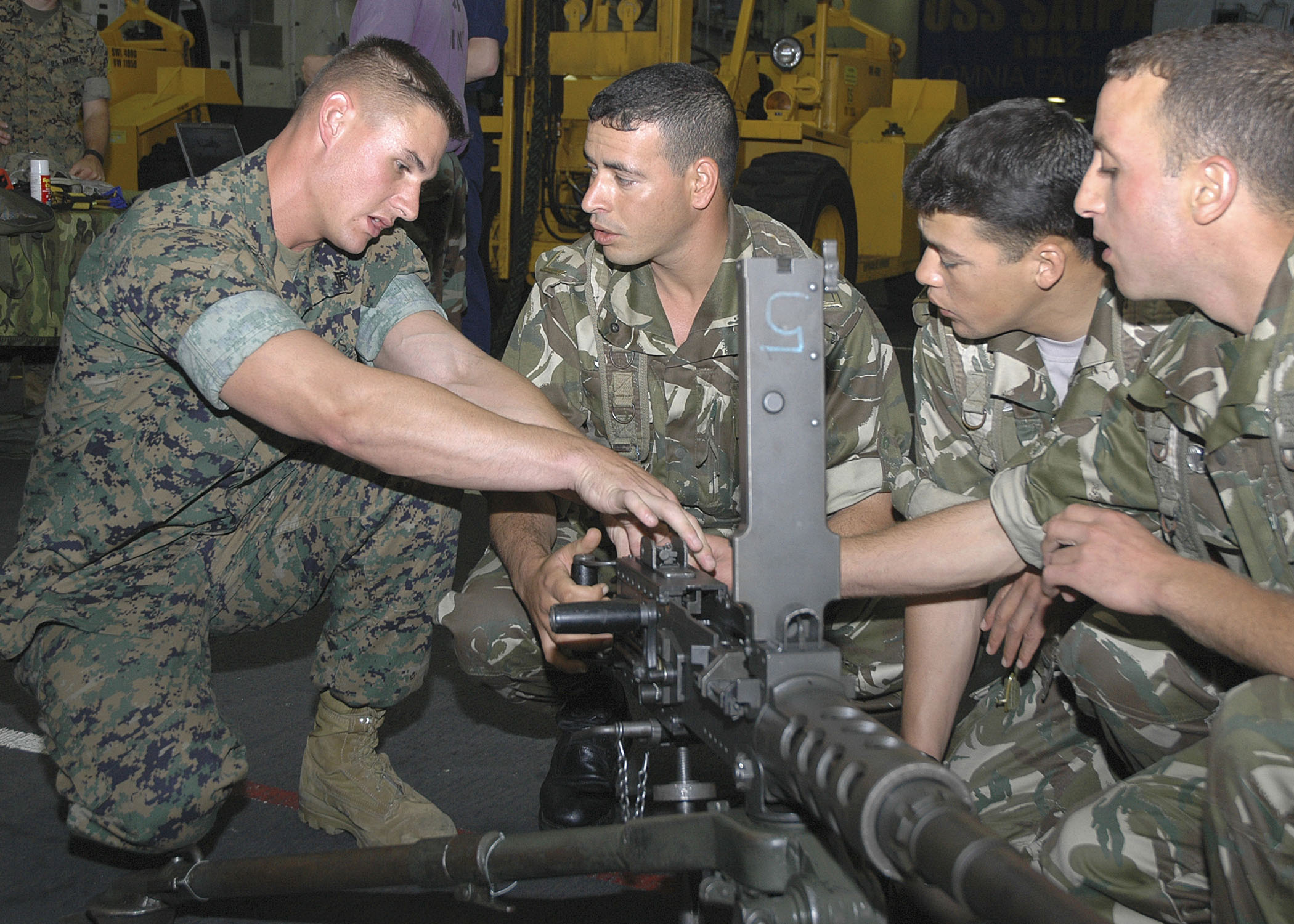
Marine Riflemen with a member of the USMC during training in the United States.

== Tasks ==
Marine Fusiliers act primarily in the amphibious environment, in the maquis and on the seaside, Marine Fusiliers provide the material and human resources that enable them to carry out their missions, hence their autonomy.

With the other units of the Algerian Navy, Army and Air Force, it therefore deals with all operations in strategic areas, at depth and in hostile environments, such as :

- Special reconnaissance
- Specialized action in depth
- Counter-terrorism on land and at sea
- Amphibious support and sustainment to special operations (with special forces)
- Recovery, protection and surveillance of strategic points
- The fight against illicit trafficking at sea and on the Algerian coast
- Protection of the Algerian coast from various threats (pollution, traffic...)
- Securing the Algerian maritime space
- Search and Rescue Support
- The protection of strategic points belonging to the Algerian Navy.

== Training ==
Marine Riflemen are trained at the Marine Rifle and Diver School (EFMP) in Jijel. This school trains Marine Riflemen, Marine Commandos and Combat Divers of the Algerian Navy and other army corps.

Following his training, the student will be incorporated into a Marine Rifle Regiment and will then be able to pass specialized training such as mine clearance... or pass the selection and training to become a Marine Commando.

In addition, Marine Riflemen also take part in training sessions abroad, notably in the United States with the USMC, the US Army and the US NAVY, in Italy with the San Marco Regiment, and in Spain with the FGNE and the Marine Infantry units.

== Equipment and armaments ==
=== Armament ===
==== Handgun ====
- Glock 17 & 18
- Caracal

Assault rifle

- AKMS
- AKM
- Type 56

Machine gun

- PKM
- RPK

Precision rifle

- Zatsava M93 Black Arrow
- SVD

Others

- RPG 7

=== Individual equipment ===
- Spectra Helmet
- Algerian Army lattice with DPM camouflage
- Tactical vest
- Bullet-proof vest
- Gloves
- Knee and elbow pads
- Thigh Holster (and Belt Holster)
- Rangers
- Protective goggles
- Camelback
- Fighting bag
- Communication Headset

=== Vehicles ===
- Mercedes-Benz G Class
- Toyota Land Cruiser
- Nissan Patrol
- Mercedes-Benz Zetros
- Mercedes-Benz Unimog
- SNVI M 120
- SNVI M 230
- SNVI M 260

==== Special vehicles ====
- BTR 80

==== Support vessels ====
- BDSL Kalaat Beni Abbes of San Giorgio class
- Kalaat Beni Class Landing Vessel
- Landing ship Polnochny class

==== Aeral ====
- MI-17 of the Algerian Air Force
