= UoE =

UoE may refer to:

- University of Edinburgh
- University of Essex
- University of Exeter
- Unidad de Operaciones Especiales
