= Navy Special Action Regiment =

Special forces regiment of the Algerian naval forces

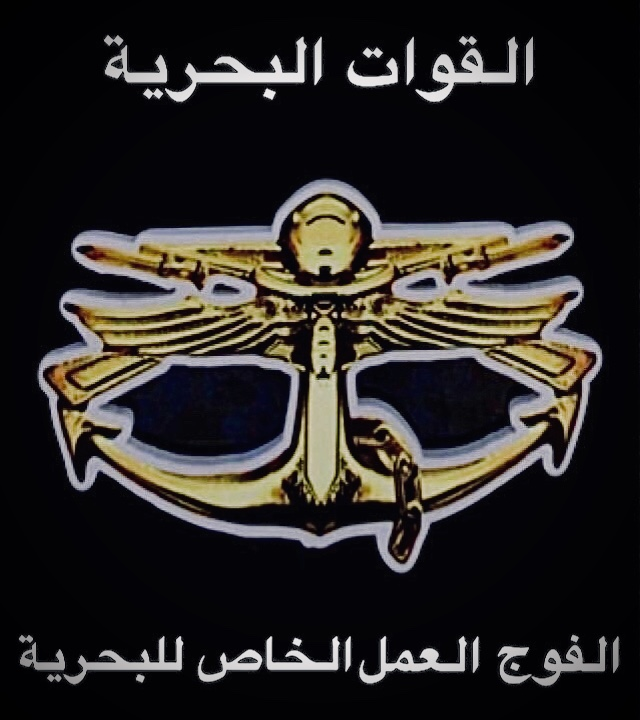
- Founded: 2005
- Service branches: Algerian Navy
- Headquarters: Algiers

The Navy Special Action Regiment (RASM; Arabic: الفوج العمل الخاص للبحرية), also known as "Commandos Marine" ("مغاوير البحرية"), is a special forces regiment belonging to the Algerian naval forces.

== History ==
The Special Action Regiment of the Navy is a special forces regiment of the Algerian naval forces.

It was in 2005 that the first promotion of commandos was born, they were directly affiliated to the Régiments de Fusiliers Marins (RFM) as a detachment of fighter commandos (DCC).

The first promotions also benefited from a commando course at the EFCIP in Boghar.

There were 4 commando sections within the marine fusiliers regiments (RFM).

However, it was decided to gather all the commando and combat diver sections in order to create a new special operations regiment for the Algerian Navy.

In addition, the RASM took over the combat divers of the former special intervention group (GIS) shortly after the latter was disbanded in 2015.

== Missions ==
The mission of the RASM is :

- Special reconnaissance
- Land combat actions from the sea or on the coast
- Hostage rescue and extraction of persons at sea or on the coast
- Destruction and sabotage of strategic targets
- Interventions at sea in the framework of the State's action at sea (fight against terrorism, maritime piracy, illicit trafficking and maritime offences...)
- The liberation of hostages on boats or ships and the resolution of serious crises at sea

== Organization ==
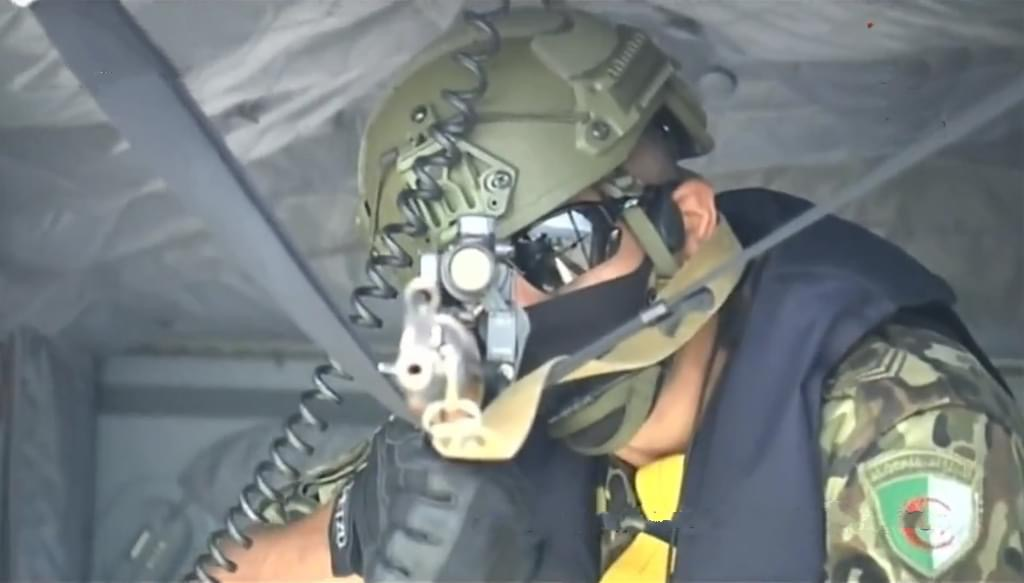
RASM sniper during a training.

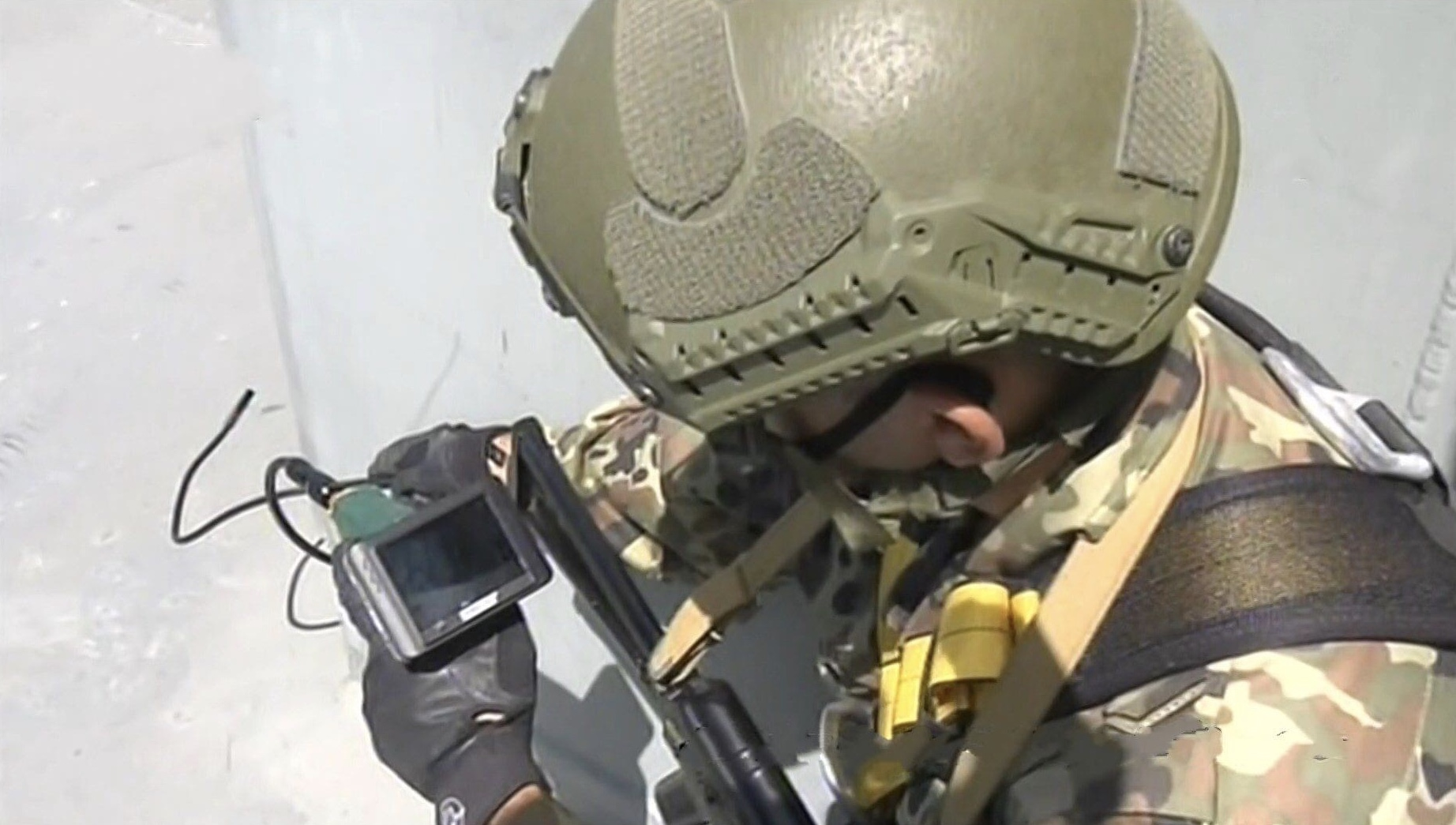
RASM operator during a training.

The RASM has several companies with various specialties:

- A headquarters
- Assault company which is specialized in sea assaults and maritime counterterrorism
- Hostage rescue company which is specialized in counterterrorism and hostage rescue
- Reconnaissance and support company, which is specialized in reconnaissance and intelligence acquisition, but also in remote neutralization and support to units engaged in combat zones (snipers...)
- Combat diver company, which is specialized in underwater action and maritime counterterrorism actions, and in hostage rescue, and is made up exclusively of combat swimmers.
- Patrol company, which is specialized in maritime patrol and search.

Each company includes a group specialized in hostage rescue on maritime or land targets, which are hostage rescue groups.

However, divers are divided into 2 parts, there are the combat divers, and the clearance divers.

- Combat divers: Combat divers have offensive missions. These divers are in charge of placing mines, assaulting port, coastal and ship targets, hostage rescue and participation in the first phases of the amphibious assault, and they can also perform intelligence.
- Mine clearance divers: the missions assigned to mine clearance divers are the search for and identification of mines, their neutralization, destruction and removal of explosive devices placed underwater or on board vessels.

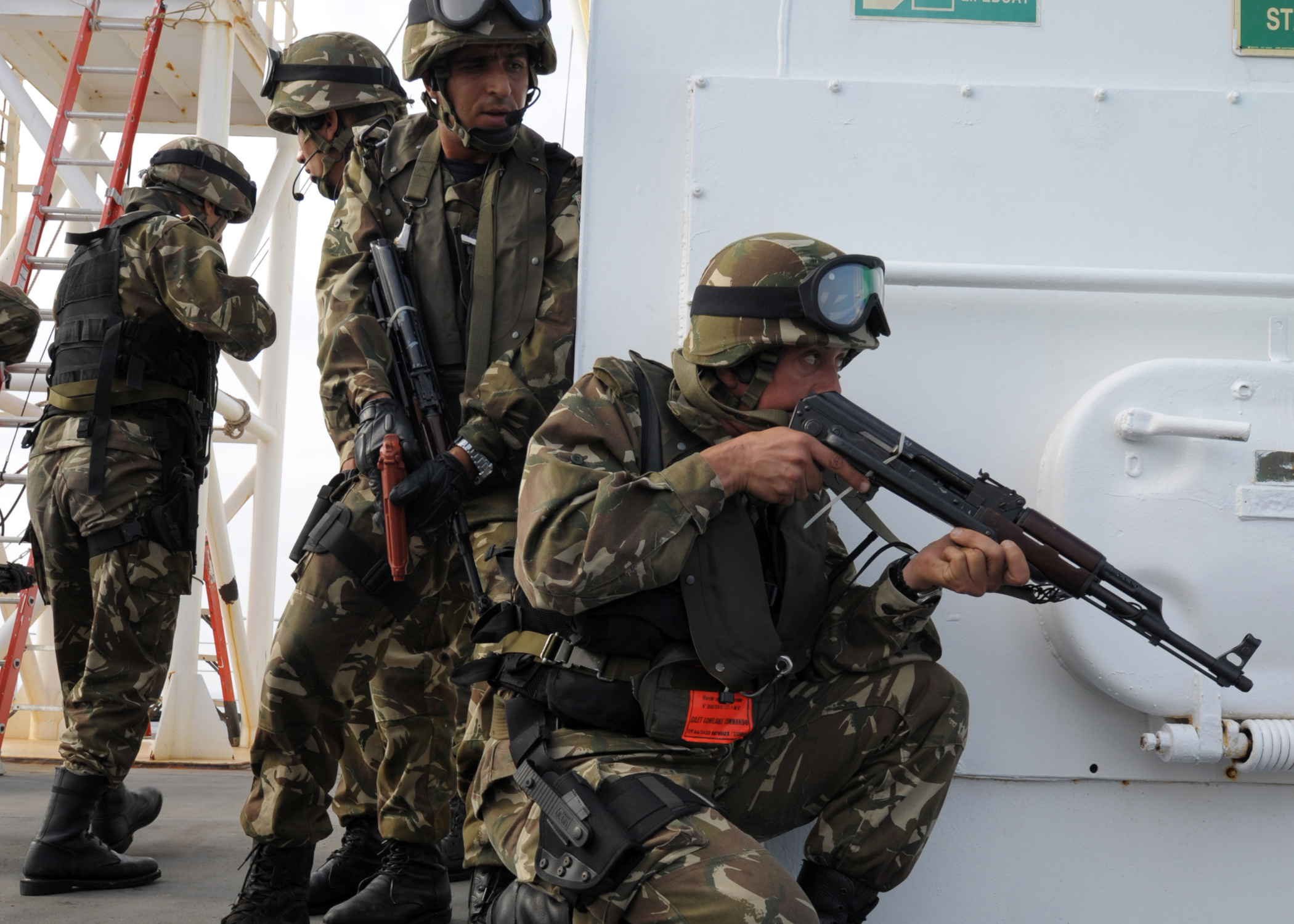
Algerian Marine commando during an exercise for Phoenix Express in 2012.

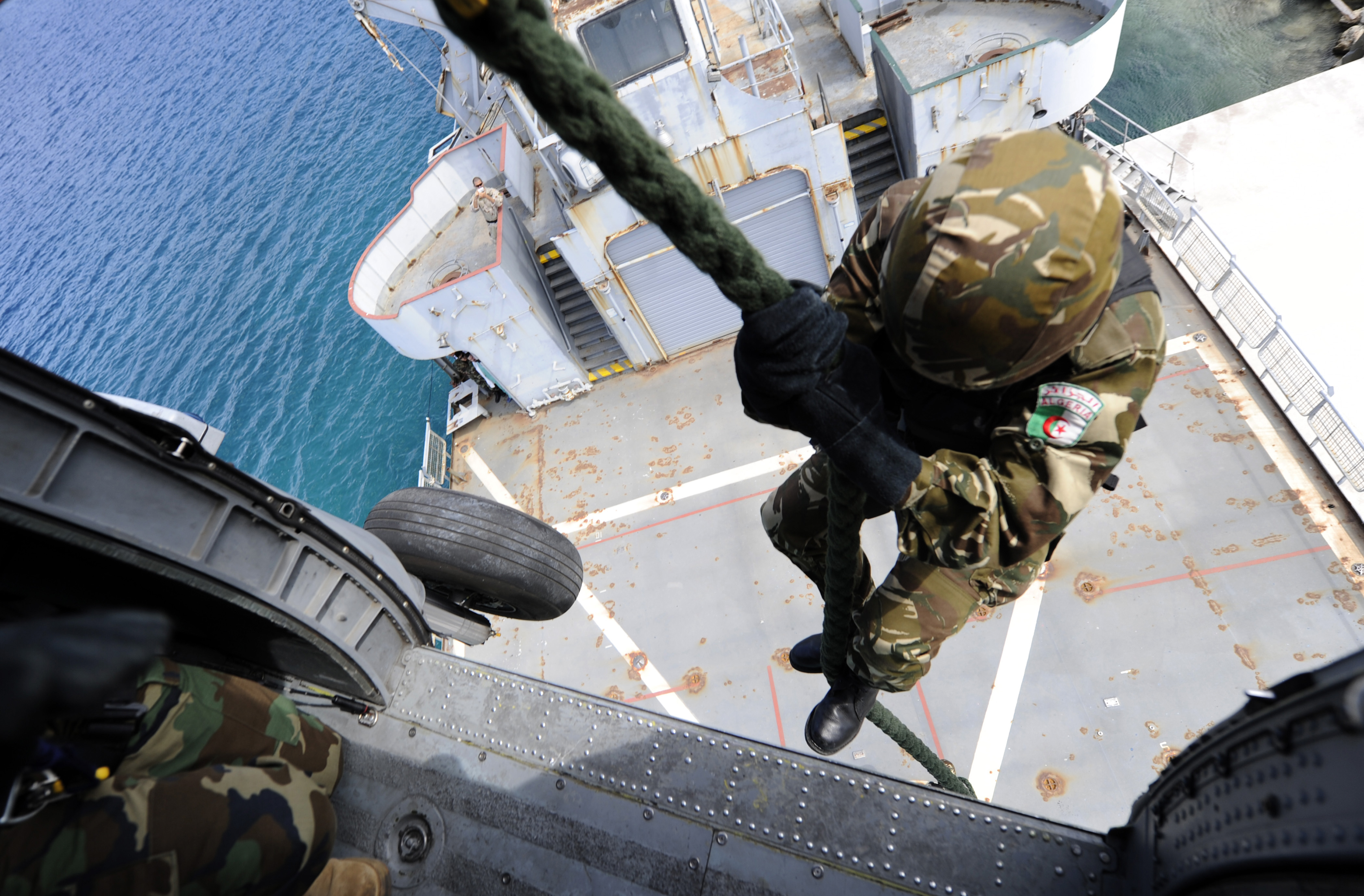
An Algerian marine commando during a training with the NATO in Greece in 2012.

An Algerian marine commando during a training with the NATO in Greece in 2012.

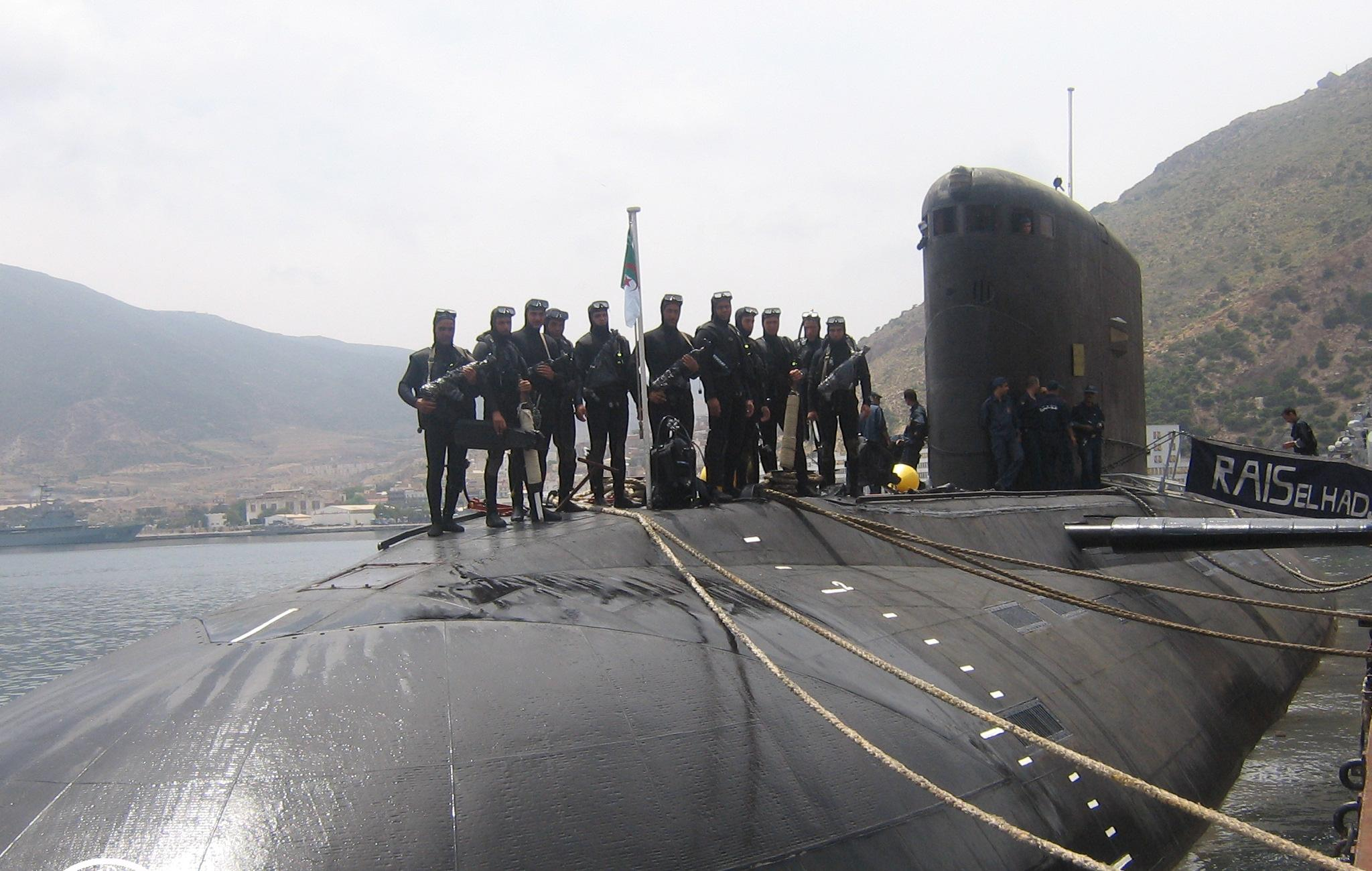
Algerian combat divers after an exercise in 2007.

== Training and coaching ==
The marine commandos are directly recruited within the marine rifle regiments, to become a marine commando it is mandatory to be a marine rifleman to participate in the selections.

Future commandos are trained at the Ecole d'application des troupes de marine (EATM) in Jijel.

Firstly, the marine riflemen who want to join the marine commandos have to pass a one-week selection phase at the EATM. At the end of the selection phase, if the candidate is selected, he will continue his studies with a commando training course, and will start the marine commando training at the school.

The duration of their training is 4 months, the training is based on three axes:

- Improving physical performance
- Shooting
- The fight

Apart from this training, the focus is on diving, which consists of carrying out Maritime Commandos Operations (MCO), the objective is to be able to carry out attacks on coastal targets.

In addition, marine commandos also take part in training abroad, in particular in the United States with the US Navy Seals, US Marines, Spanish FGNE, Tunisian marine commandos among others.

== Equipment and armament ==
=== Armament ===
The marine commandos are always in double equipment during their actions (automatic pistol + assault rifle), however according to the speciality and the mission the weapons can change, for example the divers do not have the same armament as the assault units...

==== Handgun ====
- Glock 17 in 9 × 19 mm
- Caracal in 9 × 19 mm

==== Assault rifle ====
- AKS-74U
- Crossbow (for divers)
- Underwater combat weapons with darts

Moreover, the assault rifles are custom made for each operator.

==== Machine gunner rifle ====
- PKM
- RPK

==== Precision rifle ====
- Sako TRG 22
- [Fusil de précision [Dragunov|SVD]]

==== Others ====
- Suction cup mines

== Individual equipment ==
=== For hostage rescue groups, support and recognition units ===
- Algerian navy uniform (flecktarn camouflage)
- Footwear: Tactical boots
- Helmet: Fast ops core
- Bullet-proof vest
- Tactical vest
- Elbow and knee pads
- Protective goggles
- Balaclava
- Protective gloves
- Thigh Holster
- Camelback
- Combat backpack
- Ghillie suit (for snipers and marksmen)
- Communication headset

=== Special ===
- Bullet shield
- Night vision apparatus
- Night and infrared and thermal sights
- Individual transmission apparatus
- Radios
- Silencers (which they place on their armaments)
- Eotech viewfinder, acog...
- Kayak
- Diving thruster

== Resources ==
=== Land vehicles ===
- All Terrain Vehicles, Toyota Land Cruiser, Mercedes G-Class

=== Watercraft ===
- Semi-rigid boat of the zodiac type
- Inflatable dinghy
- Stars and patrol boats Alusafe 2000, Ocea FPB-98, Kebir-class
- Intervention boat BK-10M

=== Aircraft Means ===
- Mil Mi-171Sh of the Algerian Air Force
- Helicopters of the Algerian navy
- Transport aircraft belonging to the Algerian Air Force (C130, Casa C295, Il-76...)
