= Spanish Marine Infantry =

Amphibious infantry component of Spain's navy

Marine Infantry
- Infantería de Marina
- Emblem of the Spanish Marine Infantry
- Founded: February 27, 1537
- Country: Spain
- Allegiance: King of Spain
- Type: Naval infantry
- Role: Amphibious warfare
- Size: 5,700 men
- Part of: Spanish Navy
- Garrison/HQ: San Fernando, Cádiz
- Mottos: "Per Terra et Mare" ("By Land and Sea!") "Brave by land and sea" ("¡Valientes por tierra y por mar!")
- March: Marcha heroica de la Infantería de Marina
- Anniversaries: 27 February
- Engagements: Battle of Lepanto; War of Jenkins' Ear; Siege of Pensacola; Peninsular War; Spanish–American War; Rif War; Spanish Civil War; Ifni War; Yugoslav Wars; Bosnian War; NATO intervention in Bosnia and Herzegovina; Kosovo War; Operation Allied Force; Global War on Terrorism; Iraq War; War in Afghanistan; Operation Atalanta

Commanders
- Current commander: Divisional General Rafael Roldán Tudela

The Marine Infantry (Spanish: Infantería de Marina) are the marines of the Spanish Navy. Responsible for conducting amphibious warfare. Fully integrated into the Spanish Navy's structure, the branch's history dates back to 1537 when Holy Roman Emperor Charles V formed the Compañías Viejas del Mar de Nápoles, making it the oldest marine unit in existence.

== History ==
=== First period ===
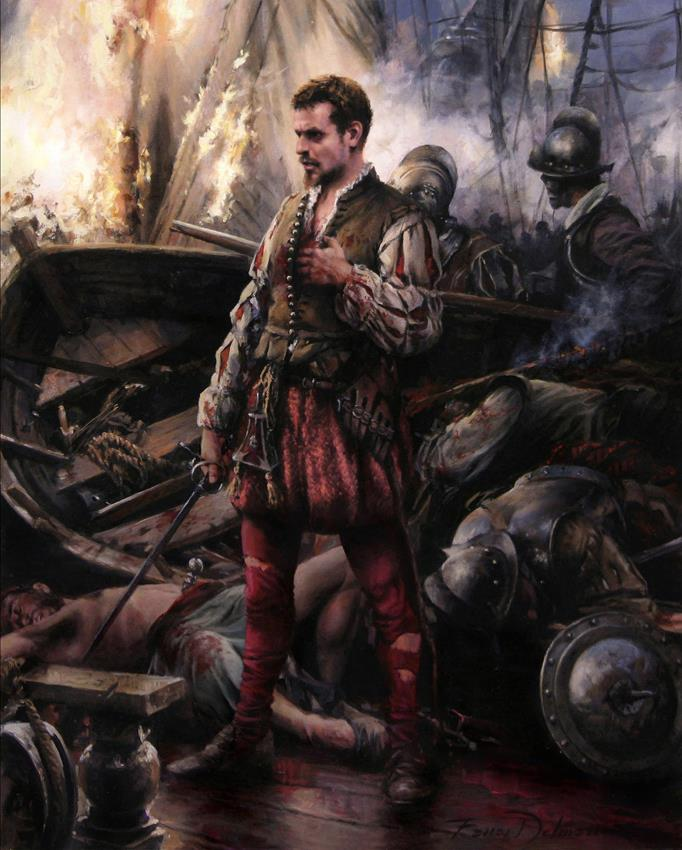
One of the most famous Spanish Marines is Miguel de Cervantes, author of the novel Don Quixote, who was wounded in the Battle of Lepanto in 1571. Another famous writer, Pedro Calderón de la Barca, also served with the marines.

The Infantería de Armada (Navy Infantry) was created by Charles V in 1537, when he permanently assigned the Compañías Viejas del Mar de Nápoles (Old Sea Companies of Naples) to the Escuadras de Galeras del Mediterráneo (Mediterranean Galley Squadrons). But it was Philip II who established today's concept of a landing force. This was a pure naval power projection ashore by forces deployed from ships that could maintain their ability to fight despite being based on board. This is the period of the famous Tercios (literally "One Third", due to its organisation: one third of musketeers, one third of swordsmen and the final third of pikemen):

- Tercio Nuevo de la Mar de Nápoles.
- Tercio de la Armada del Mar Océano.
- Tercio de Galeras de Sicilia.
- Tercio Viejo del Mar Océano y de Infantería Napolitana.

Of the Tercios above, the first is considered the core of the Spanish Marine Infantry, and it bears in its coat of arms two crossed anchors that became the Corps' coat of arms until 1931.

In 1704, the Tercios became regiments: Regimiento de Bajeles (Vessel's Regiments), Regimiento de la Armada (Navy Regiment), R. del Mar de Nápoles (Naples' Sea Regiment), and R. de Marina de Sicilia (Sicily's Navy Regiment), detaching some small units to the Army, and the main body remained in the Navy becoming the Cuerpo de Batallones de Marina (Navy Battalions Corps).

The battles that the marines served in during this period included:

- Algiers expedition (1541).
- Battle of Lepanto (1571).
- Conquest of the Azores (1583).
- 3rd Spanish Armada (1597).
- Recapture of Salvador (1625).

=== Second period ===
In 1717, the Cuerpo de Batallones de Marina was definitively settled and organized into a 12-battalion corps with a corresponding regimental HQ overseeing the supervision of these units. The first ones were named: Armada, Bajeles, Marina, Oceano, Mediterráneo and Barlovento. Their mission was to form the "Main body of landing columns and ship's soldiers tasks" in a time that boarding was still a critical part of battle at sea. They were also gun crews. In 1728 the battalion Mediterráneo and in 1731 the battalion Barlovento were disbanded. In 1741 there were eight battalions and ten years later another was added. In 1740 a marine artillery corps was founded. At mid 18th century there were 12,000 marine infantry and 3,000 marine gunners. The infantry formed boarding parties while the gunners manned the ship cannons. As needed landing parties were formed. Both corps also garrisoned the navy's coastal fortresses. During the War of Spanish Independence both the marine infantry and the marine artillery were reorganized as an administrative division of seven regiments, mainly fighting on land as part of army divisions in an operational role. In a 1793, a woman, Ana Maria de Soto, disguised as a man, and answering to the name of Antonio Maria de Soto, enlisted in the 6th company of 11° Battalion of the Navy, being licensed with pension and honors in 1798, when she was discovered to be a woman.

The major actions they took part in during this period were:

- Spanish conquest of Sardinia (1717).
- Spanish conquest of Oran (1732).
- Battle of Cartagena de Indias (1741).
- Siege of Havana (1762).
- Invasion of Algiers (1775).
- Siege of Pensacola (1781).
- Siege of Toulon (1793).
- Ferrol Expedition (1800).
- British invasions of the River Plate (1806).

=== Third period ===
Color of the 3rd Marine Regiment of Cartagena, today Tercio de Levante

The increasing efficiency of the naval artillery made boarding obsolete after the Napoleonic Wars, the marine infantry and marine artillery was merged in 1827 into a brigade, Brigada Real de Marina with focus on artillery. The brigade that consisted of two battalions was renamed the Real Cuerpo de Artillería de Marina in 1833. In the First Carlist War 1834-39, three battalions of marine infantry were organized, serving as field infantry, with an additional battalion raised to reinforce the Royal Guards in Madrid. In 1839 the corps was renamed Cuerpo de Artillería y Infanteriá de Marina. In 1841 the infantry was transferred to the army. The marine artillery remained in the navy under the name of Cuerpo de Artillería de Marina . However, in 1848, the naval infantry was re-established by the formation of a new Corps, Cuerpo de Infantería de Marina, , then as an infantry regiment organized into three battalions and the regimental HQ, as well as support units and the band. The marine artillery was abolished in 1857. The five battalions of marine infantry were reorganized in 1869 to three regiments, one for each naval station. By this time, the mission of the marines changed from naval garrison troops, to a landing force serving mainly in the colonies.

During the Third Carlist War 1872–1876 the marines fought as field infantry. In 1879, the marine infantry academy, the Academia General Central de Infantería de Marina was founded. The colonial wars in the Philippines and on Cuba, with constant landing operations, lead to a reorganization of the marines into three brigades of two regiments each. In 1886 the marines contained four brigades, each with four tercios, while the reorganization of 1893 created three regiments of two battalions each. During the Philippine Revolution and the Spanish–American War the marines fought as part of army divisions.

Though Spain's empire was dismembered in the nineteenth century the marines continued to be active abroad. Its most important actions in this period were:

- Spanish reconquest of Santo Domingo (1808)
- Cochinchina campaign (1858)
- Second French intervention in Mexico (1862)
- Spanish–American War (1898)
- Kert campaign (1911)

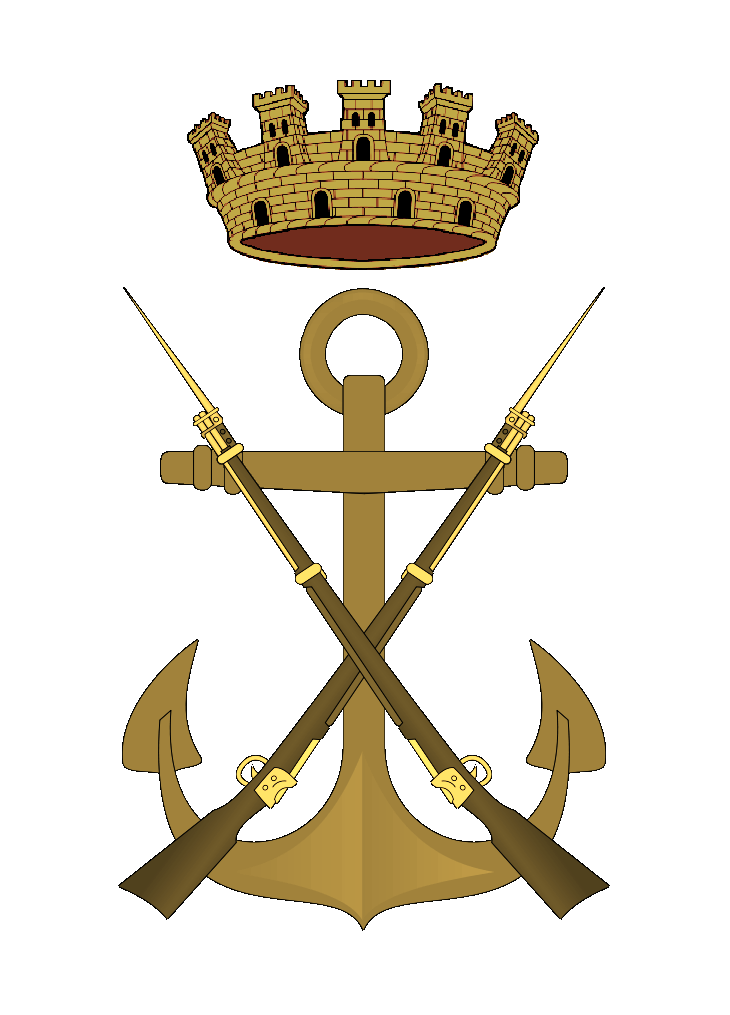
Insignia during the Republican period (1931–1939)

Insignia during the Francoist period (1939–1975)

These actions were carried out by the Batallones Expedicionarios (Expeditionary Battalions), some of them campaigning abroad for up to ten years.

=== Fourth period ===
At the end of the World War I, the Battle of Gallipoli made almost all countries abandon the idea of amphibious assault. The world's marine corps fell into a deep crisis, with the Spanish Marine Infantry being no exception, though it enjoyed success during the Third Rif War in its innovative Alhucemas amphibious assault in 1925, when it employed coordinated air and naval gunfire to support the assault.

Owing to its high-profile action in the unpopular Rif Wars, the Spanish Navy Marine corps was branded as a leftover of the Spanish colonial era. After the proclamation of the Second Spanish Republic in 1931, the reforms of the armed forces introduced by newly nominated Republican Minister of War Manuel Azaña within the first months of the new government sought to disband the corps.

Before it was officially disbanded, however, the Spanish Civil War intervened and the corps split and served both sides. The garrisons stationed in Ferrol and Cádiz aligned with the Nationalist and the Navy Marines stationed there quickly secured the naval bases there. The detachment stationed on the two gunboats docked in Cartagena sided along with the crew of the gunboats with the Republicans, as well as a detachment in Madrid. During the bitterly fought war the Marines performed garrison duties, led landing parties, and provided expert artillery and machine gun crews. However, the Republican 151 Brigada Mixta who absorbed the marines who aligned with the Republicans fought mostly inland battles far away from the sea under the command of Commander Pedro Muñoz Caro. They took part in the Battle of the Segre where photographer Robert Capa had a famous photograph taken of them in that battle. Republican Infantería de Marina Lieutenant Colonel Ambrosio Ristori de la Cuadra, killed in action during the Siege of Madrid, was posthumously awarded the Laureate Plate of Madrid.

=== Fifth period ===
After the civil war, during the dictatorship of Francisco Franco, the strength of the Infantería Marina was increased. In 1957, the Grupo Especial Anfibio (Amphibious Special Group) was created, and the Spanish Marine Infantry returned to its primary duty as a Landing Force Mission. In 1958 it established a beachhead in Spanish Sahara and Ifni during the Ifni War. The capabilities and strength of the Spanish Marine Infantry were increased: new amphibious vehicles, anti-tank weapons, individual equipment and artillery.

The Tercio de Armada (TEAR) became the main amphibious unit and has experienced several restructures that led to the E-01 Plan, which defines the requirements and structures from the year 2000 for the Spanish Marine Infantry. The Spanish Marines have been present in Europe, Central America and Asia in an anonymous role as an "emergency force" ready to evacuate civilians in conflict areas, or as a deterrence force in providing cover for the actions of allied forces. The current base for the Spanish Marines is in San Fernando.

=== 21st century ===
The Spanish Marine Infantry have been deployed to various NATO operations such as Afghanistan.

== Mission ==
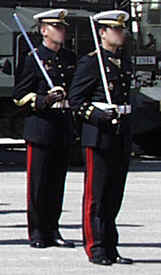
Marine Infantry uniform

The Spanish Marine Infantry is an elite corps, highly specialised in amphibious warfare, that is, to project an amphibious force onto a hostile, or potentially hostile, coast. Its ability to embark on a short term notice with (land, air and naval) Navy assets, makes it a unit with a high strategic value. Adding to this a high degree of training, and the capability to deploy swiftly in international waters, results in a potent dissuasive force available at a short notice in distant regions.

One of the main characteristics of a marine is the uniform that he wears. On the sleeves of the Spanish Marines are the three "Sardinetas", which marks it as a member of the Royal House Corps. This was given in recognition for a heroic last stand at the Morro Castle during the siege of Havana in 1762. The only other unit to wear the sardinetas and red trouser stripes is the Spanish Royal Guard. Spanish Marines have modern assets to comply with its mission, having personnel specialised in artillery, sapping, helicopters, special operations, communications, tanks, among others. Some vehicles form the Grupo Mecanizado Anfibio del Tercio de Armada (the Mechanized Amphibious Group of the Navy Tercio). The Marines of Spain are not only a fleet force, as the Spanish Royal Marine Guard Company are responsible for the defense and security forces of naval bases and facilities, naval schools and training units, and all facilities that support the Marines themselves.

=== Special operations deployments ===
In June 2009, the Special Naval Warfare Force (FGNE) was created through the fusion of the Special Operations Unit (UOE) of the Marine Infantry as well as the Special Combat Divers Unit (UEBC) and the Special Explosives Defusers Unit (UEDE) from the Navy Diving Center. The FGNE is organized inside the whole Navy. This unit has taken part in several operations including Atalanta in Somalia, United Nations Interim Force in Lebanon, Hispaniola in Haiti and the hijack of the fishing vessel Alakrana in Somali waters.

== Organization ==
=== Marine brigade ===
The main fighting Force of the Spanish Marine Infantry is the Marine Infantry Brigade, which includes the following units:

- Marine Infantry Brigade (BRIMAR)
  - Headquarters Battalion, with 1x Headquarters, 1x Signals, 1x Military Intelligence, Battlefield Surveillance & Electronic Warfare and 1x Reconnaissance & Target Acquisition Company
  - 1st Landing Battalion, with 1x HQ & Service, 3x Naval Fusiliers and 1x Weapons Company
  - 2nd Landing Battalion, with 1x HQ & Service, 3x Naval Fusiliers and 1x Weapons Company
  - 3rd Mechanized Landing Battalion, with 1x HQ & Service, 2x Mechanized (Piranha IIIC 8x8), 1x Tank (M60A3 TTS) and 1x Weapons Company
  - Amphibious Mobility Group, with 1x HQ & Service, 1x Engineer, 1x Amphibious Assault Vehicle, 1x Anti-Tank (TOW) and 1x Boat Company
  - Artillery Landing Group, with 1x HQ & Service, 2x Field Artillery (105mm Mod. 56), 1x Self-propelled Artillery (155mm M109AE), 1x Air-Defense Artillery Battery (Mistral) and 1x Fire Support Coordination and Control Company
  - Combat Service Support Group, with 1x HQ & Service, 1x Transport, 1x Medical, 1x Supply, 1x Maintenance Company and 1x Beach Organization & Movement Company

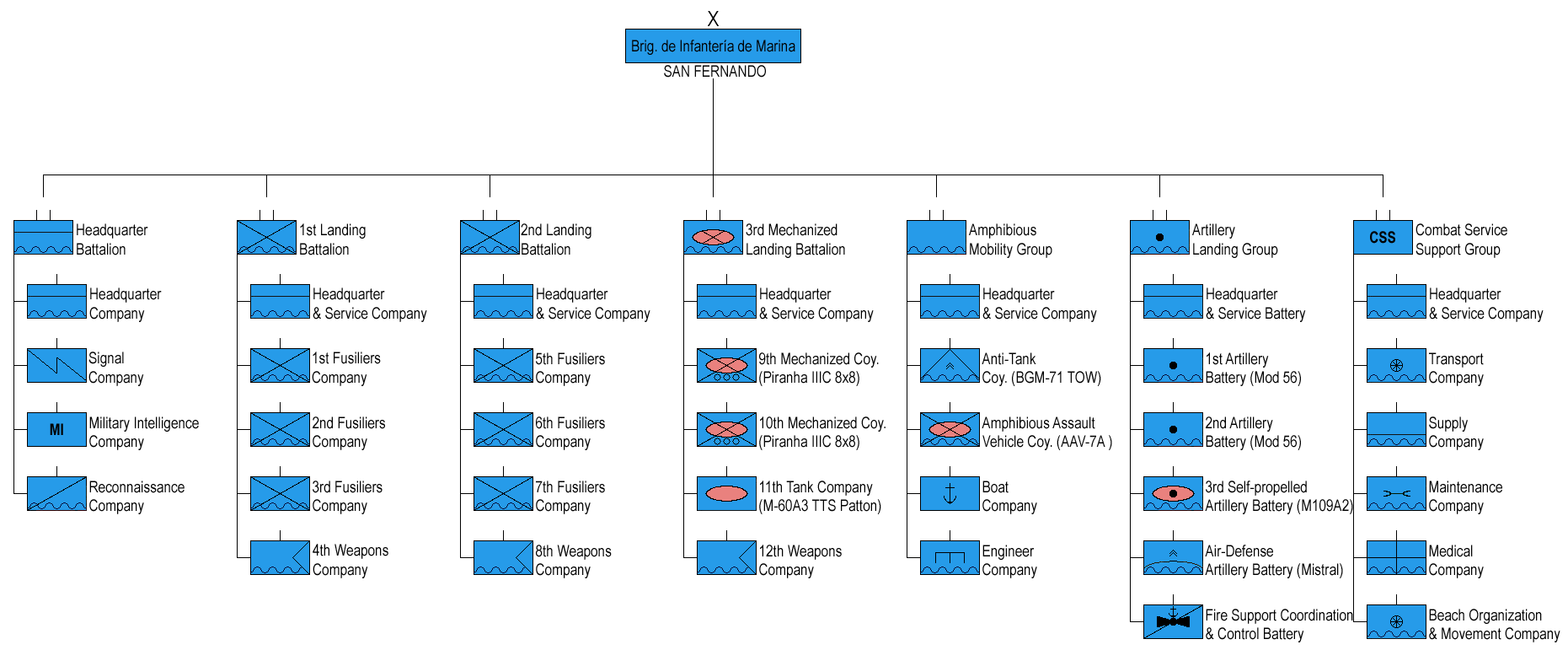
Structure of the Marine Infantry Brigade, 2017

=== Protection Forces ===
Spanish Naval Protection Forces emblem

The Protection Force (FUPRO) is in charge of ensuring the security of naval and other designated facilities and contains around 2000 troops. FUPRO is commanded by a brigadier general and is made up of the following battalion sized Tercios (En:Thirds):

- Tercio del Norte (TERNOR) - Northern Regiment
- Tercio de Levante (TERLEV) - Eastern Regiment
- Tercio del Sur (TERSUR) - South Regiment
- Unidad de Seguridad del Mando Naval de Canarias (USCAN) - Canary Islands Naval Command Security Unit
- Agrupación de Infantería de Marina de Madrid (AGRUMAD) - Madrid Marine Infantry Group

=== Special Forces ===
See article: Fuerza de Guerra Naval Especial

Emblem of the Spanish Naval Special Warfare Force.

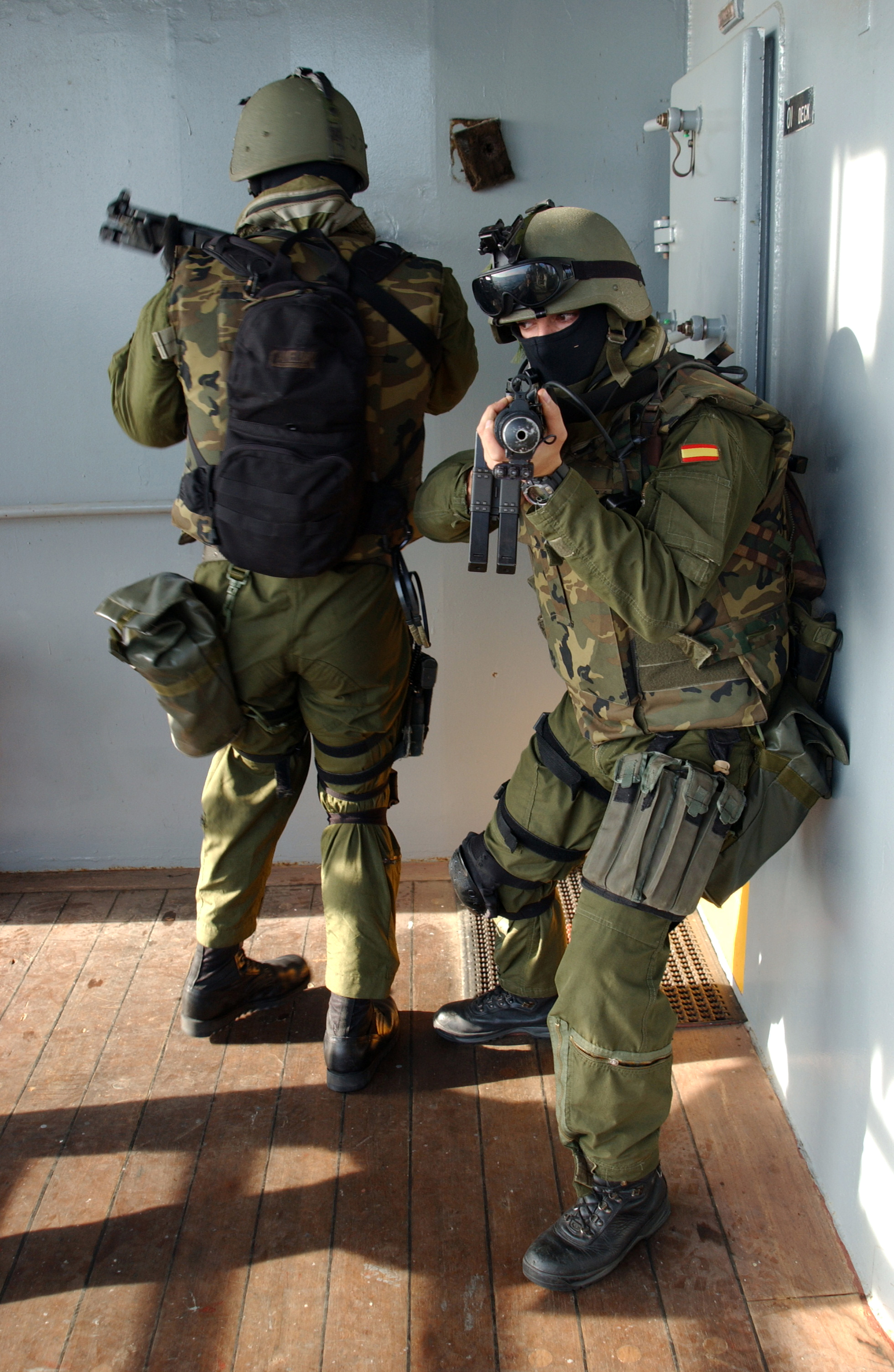
Members of the Special Operations Unit (UOE) during a boarding practice.

The Fuerza de Guerra Naval Especial (FGNE) is the special operations force of the Spanish Navy specializing in maritime, land and coastal environments. It is made up of the former Special Naval Warfare Command, which comprised the Special Operations Unit (UOE) of the Tercio de Armada and the Special Combat Divers Unit (UEBC).

These units are grouped into elements with the following main tasks:

- Command and control: Command Group and Staff and CIS Platoon of the Staff and Support Unit
- Combat: Estoles
- Combat Support (CSU): Boat and parachute unit of the Staff and Support Unit.
- Combat Services Support (CSSU): Health, Provisioning, Transportation, folding, Weapons and Material and Cargo of the Staff and Support Unit

=== Marine Company of the Royal Guard ===
Flag of the Marine company of the Spanish Royal Guard.

The Compañía Mar Océano de la Guardia Real was created on 1 December 1981 as part of the Royal Guard. Its organization is that of a Rifle Company.

=== Naval Police ===
Naval Police emblem

The Naval Police Units are basically organized for the performance, both in peace and in war, of specific security and order missions. They fulfill the duties of surveillance of units and units of the Navy, custody, escort and regulation of transport and military convoys, protection of authorities, identification of personnel and vehicles, etc. In the exercise of their functions they will have the character of agents of the authority.

=== Target Acquisition and Reconnaissance (TAR) Company ===
The Compañía de Reconocimiento y Adquisición de Blancos (Target Acquisition and Reconnaissance, TAR) was created in 2012, replacing the Reconnaissance Unit (URECON) assigned to the Headquarters Battalion. Its mission is the reconnaissance for the Marine Infantry Brigade (BRIMAR) operations. Its tasks are observation and reconnaissance, target acquisition, control of fire support (artillery and air strikes), close air support (helicopter precision marksmanship), direct action and mobility. For this, the most veteran marines train in insertion / extraction using skydiving and diving techniques.

=== Sección Martín Álvarez ===
While she remained active, the Spanish aircraft carrier Príncipe de Asturias (R11) had an assigned section of embarked Marines who were responsible for the security and control of the vessel, conducting Maritime Interdiction Operations (MIO) using helicopters or RIBs.

Once the ship began its decommissioning process, the Section was dismantled and its members assigned to other units.

== Personnel structure ==
Spanish Marines Infantry Direct Entry 2018
Rank Level	Education	Training	Rank Span
Officers	Bachillerato and University Entrance Exam; 18–21 years old	Escuela Naval Militar (ENM); 5 years	First Lieutenant - Lieutenant General
Officers	Bachelor's degree, not older than 26 years	ENM 1 year	First Lieutenant - Lieutenant General
Officers	Master's degree, not older than 27 years	ENM 1 year	First Lieutenant - Lieutenant General
Non-commissioned officers	Bachillerato; 18–21 years old	Escuela de Infantería de Marina General Albacete Fuster * Curso de Acceso a la Escala de Suboficiales; 3 years	OR6 - OR9
Non-commissioned officers	Técnico Medio (secondary vocational degree), not older than 21 years	Escuela de Infantería de Marina General Albacete Fuster * Curso de Acceso a la Escala de Suboficiales; 3 years	OR6 - OR9
Non-commissioned officers	Entrance exam to Vocational College, not older than 21 years	Escuela de Infantería de Marina General Albacete Fuster * Curso de Acceso a la Escala de Suboficiales; 3 years	OR6 - OR9
Men	Educación Secundaria Obligatoria; 18–29 years of age	Escuela de Infantería de Marina General Albacete Fuster: * Curso de Acceso a Militar Profesional de Tropa y Marinería	OR1 - OR5

== Ranks of the Spanish Marine Infantry ==
Even though the ranks of the Marine Infantry are similar to Spanish Army ranks they wear also sleeve and cuff insignia to recognize them as part of the naval establishment, aside from shoulder rank insignia.

=== Commissioned officer ranks ===
The rank insignia of commissioned officers.

NATO code	OF-10	OF-9	OF-8	OF-7	OF-6	OF-5	OF-4	OF-3	OF-2	OF-1
Battledress
Spanish Marine Infantry
Spanish Marine Infantry			Teniente general	General de división	General de brigada	Coronel	Teniente coronel	Comandante	Capitán	Teniente	Alférez

=== Other ranks ===
The rank insignia of non-commissioned officers and enlisted personnel.

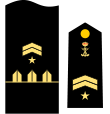
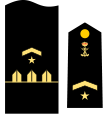
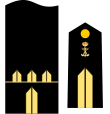
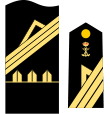
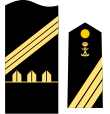
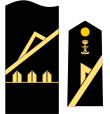
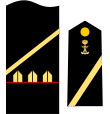
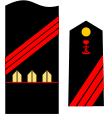
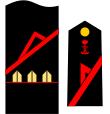
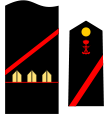
NATO code	OR-9		OR-8	OR-7	OR-6	OR-5	OR-4	OR-3	OR-2	OR-1
Battledress
Spanish Marine Infantry
Spanish Marine Infantry	Suboficial mayor	Subteniente	Brigada	Sargento primero	Sargento	Cabo mayor	Cabo primero	Cabo	Soldado de primera	Soldado

=== Cadets, candidates and recruits ===
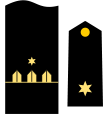
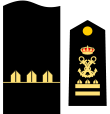
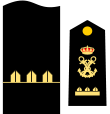
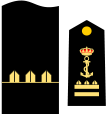
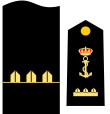
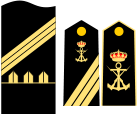
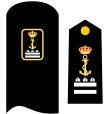
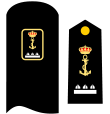
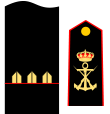
NATO Code	Officer cadets					NCO candidates			Recruit
(Spain) Spanish Marine Infantry
(Spain) Spanish Marine Infantry	Alférez (Alumno 5º)	Guardiamarina de 2º (Alumno 4º)	Guardiamarina de 1º (Alumno 3º)	Aspirante de 2º (Alumno 2º)	Aspirante de 1º (Alumno 1º)	Sargento Alumno 3º año	Alumno 2º año	Alumno 1º año	Aspirante MPTM

== The Spanish Marine's Decalogue ==
=== Original Spanish ===
- 1º mandamiento : Mi primer deber como infante de marina es estar permanentemente dispuesto a defender España y entregar si fuera preciso mi propia vida
- 2º mandamiento : Seré siempre respetuoso con mis mandos, leal con mis compañeros, generoso y sacrificado en mi trabajo
- 3º mandamiento : Estaré preparado para afrontar con valor abnegación y espíritu de servicio cualquier misión asiganada a la Infantería de Marina
- 4º mandamiento : Seré siempre respetuoso con las tradiciones del cuerpo, estaré orgulloso de su historia y nunca haré nada que pueda desprestigiar su nombre
- 5º mandamiento : Ajustaré mi conducta al respeto de las personas, su dignidad y derechos serán valores que guardaré y exigiré
- 6º mandamiento : Como Infante de marina la disciplina constituirá mi norma de actuación, la practicaré y exigiré en todos los cometidos que se me asignen
- 7º mandamiento : Como Infante de marina mi misión será sagrada, en su cumplimiento venceré o moriré
- 8º mandamiento : Aumentar la preparación física y mental será mi objetivo permanente
- 9º mandamiento : Seré duro en la fatiga, bravo en el combate, nunca el desaliento en mi pecho anidará, nobleza y valentía serán mis emblemas
- 10º mandamiento : ¡Mi lema! ... ¡Valiente por tierra y por mar!

=== English ===
- 1st commandment: As a Marine my first duty is to be constantly ready to defend Spain and give my life if necessary.
- 2nd commandment: I shall be always loyal with my brothers, respectful with my superiors, generous and devoted to my task.
- 3rd commandment: I shall be always ready to face with courage, dedication and spirit of service any mission assigned to the Marine Infantry.
- 4th commandment: I shall be always respectful about the traditions of the Corps, be proud of its history and will never do anything that may adversely reflect on its name.
- 5th commandment: I shall guide my conduct with respect for people, their dignity and rights I shall guard.
- 6th commandment: As a Marine, discipline will be my standard of acting in all tasks assigned to me.
- 7th commandment: As a Marine, my mission is sacred; in its fulfillment, I shall either win or die.
- 8th commandment: Improving my body and training my mind shall be my permanent goals.
- 9th commandment: I shall be strong on fatigue, brave in battle, discouragement shall never nest in my heart, for honor and courage are my banners.
- 10th commandment: My motto!: Bravery in land and in the sea!

== Equipment ==
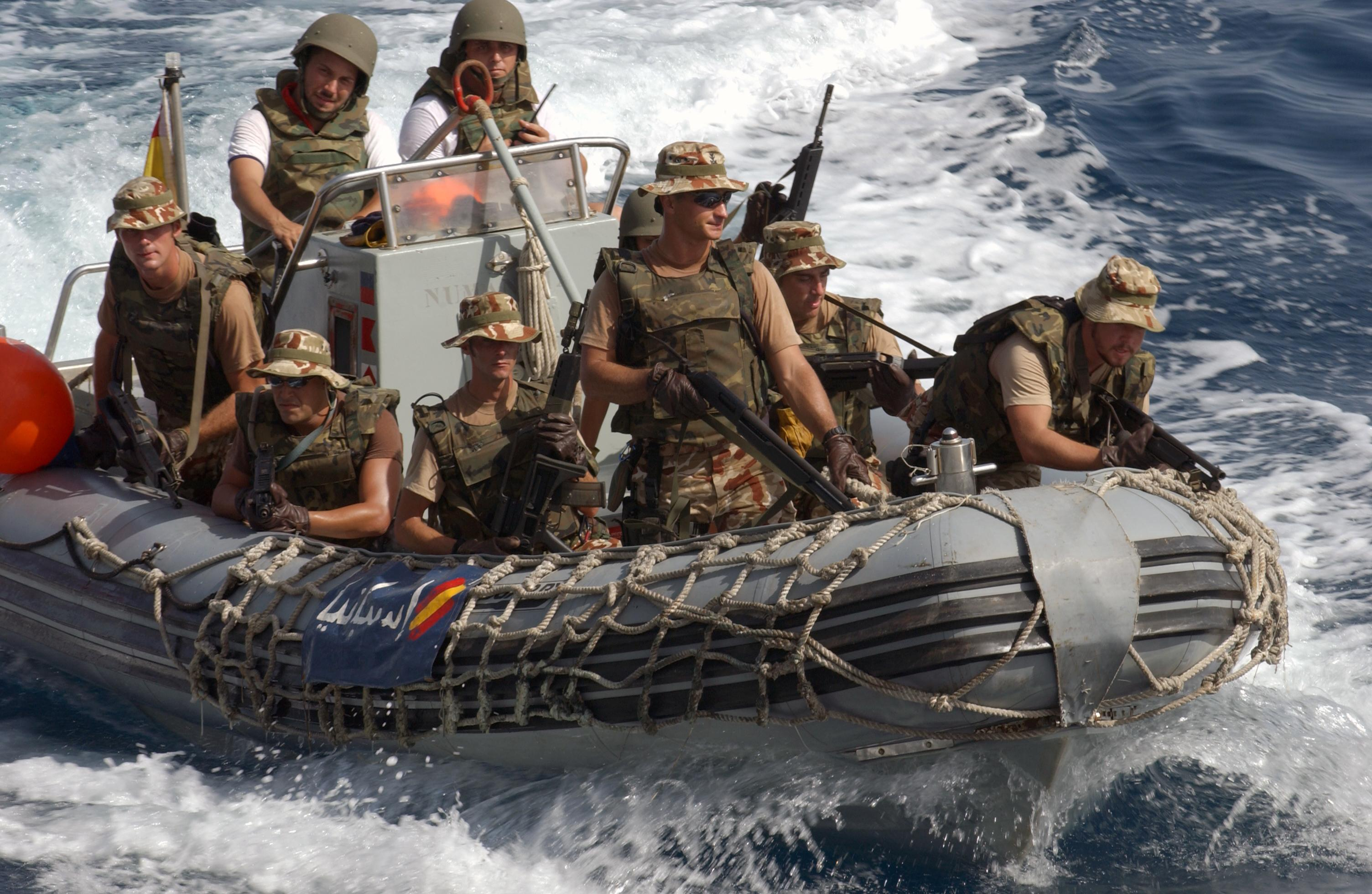
Spanish marines assigned to the frigate SPS Numancia (F83)

=== Infantry weapons ===
Weapon	Image	Origin	Notes
Pistols
FN Herstal P9-17		Belgium	Replaced by the Glock 45 as standard issue handgun.
Glock 17 Gen.5		Austria	Standard issue pistol used by the Special Naval Warfare Force
Heckler & Koch USP-Compact		Germany	
Glock 26		Austria	used by security detail
Assault rifles
Heckler & Koch G36		Germany	E, K (short barrel) and C (carbine) versions in active service
Heckler & Koch HK-416A5		Germany	New standard issue rifle
CETME		Spain	Some CETME LV (with SUSAT visor) and LC (with retractable stock) in 5.56mm NATO and CETME C in 7.62mm NATO remain in limited service
Grenade launchers
AG36		Germany	The AG36 is a 40 mm single-shot grenade launcher for the G36 assault rifle and variants (G36K, G36V etc.) from Heckler & Koch
LAG-40M1		Spain	The SB-40 LAG is a 40 mm automatic grenade launcher developed and produced in Spain by the Empresa Nacional Santa Bárbara
Mk.19 Mod.3		United States	Quantity 46
Sniper rifles
Heckler & Koch HK417 SNIPER		Germany	
Accuracy International Arctic Warfare		United Kingdom	including AXM and AXMC .338
Barrett M82A1		United States	
Barrett M95		United States	
Submachine guns
Heckler & Koch MP5		Germany	A3, A4 and A5 versions remain in service
FN P90		Belgium	
Machine guns
FN Minimi Para 5.56×45mm NATO		Belgium	
FN Minimi MK3 7.62×51mm NATO		Belgium	Replaced the CETME Ameli
Rheinmetall MG-3		Germany	Replaced by FN Minimi Used only in vehicles or as stationary weapon
Browning M-2 HB QCB		United States	
Anti-tank weapons
Instalaza C-100 Alcotán		Spain	100mm
Instalaza C-90C		Spain	90mm
Spike missile		Israel	24 launchers and 240 rockets
Anti-aircraft
Mistral		France	

=== Vehicles ===
Weapon	Image	Origin	Notes
Armoured vehicles
Piranha IIIC 8x8		Switzerland	Quantity 39 (26 ACV, 2 command vehicles, 1 ambulance, 1 recovery vehicle, 1 for Electronic Warfare, 4 sapper vehicles and 4 recon vehicles armed with a 30mm main gun)
AAV-7A1		United States	Quantity 19 (17 AAVP, 1 AAVC, 1 AAVR) Replaces by 34 Amphibious Combat Vehicle(ACV)
Humvee		United States	Quantity 123 Humvee (are being replaced by URO VAMTAC ST5, between 190 and 280 in various versions)
M-88 E		United States	The Marine Corps has a single example of this tank.
Unarmoured vehicles
Volkswagen Amarok		Germany	
Land Rover Defender		United Kingdom	
Ssangyong Rexton		South Korea	Quantity 14

=== Artillery ===
Weapon	Image	Origin	Notes
ECIA		Spain	81 mm mortar
M-109A5E		United States	Six vehicles loaned from the Spanish Army
OTO Melara M-56		Italy	Quantity 12

== Traditions ==
=== Hymn ===
The Marcha Heroica de la Infanteria de Marina (Heroic March of the Marine Infantry), also known as the Himno de la Infantería de Marina, is the official march of the Spanish Marines. It was authored by J. Raimundo and composed by Colonel Don Agustín Díez Guerrero. The text is as follows:

Marines
let's go fight
The Homeland enlarge
and its glory increase
nobility and bravery
our emblems are:
not abandon the ensign
to the noise of the cannon
why die for it
It is our obligation.

Don't cry to me, my mother
if in the fight I have to stay
what is the duty of the Spanish
for my country!
your blood spill

To fight, to fight
brave Marines
to win or die
for defending the noble Spain
For his honor, for his honor
let's all fight incessantly
until we achieve our soil
the admiration of the whole world

Marines
let's go fight
The Homeland enlarge
and its glory increase
nobility and bravery
our emblems are:
not abandon the ensign
to the noise of the cannon
why die for it
It is our obligation

Don't cry to me, my mother
if in the fight I have to stay
what is the duty of the Spanish
for my country!
your blood spill

Glory to the brave
that by sea and land
heroically they died
defending his flag

Let's follow their example
of unparalleled bravery
that the Marines
gloriously they know how to succeed

=== Motto ===
Its official motto is "Valientes por Tierra y por Mar" ("Braves by Land and Sea"), which is similar to other mottos used by marine units such as the Royal Marines.

=== Bands ===
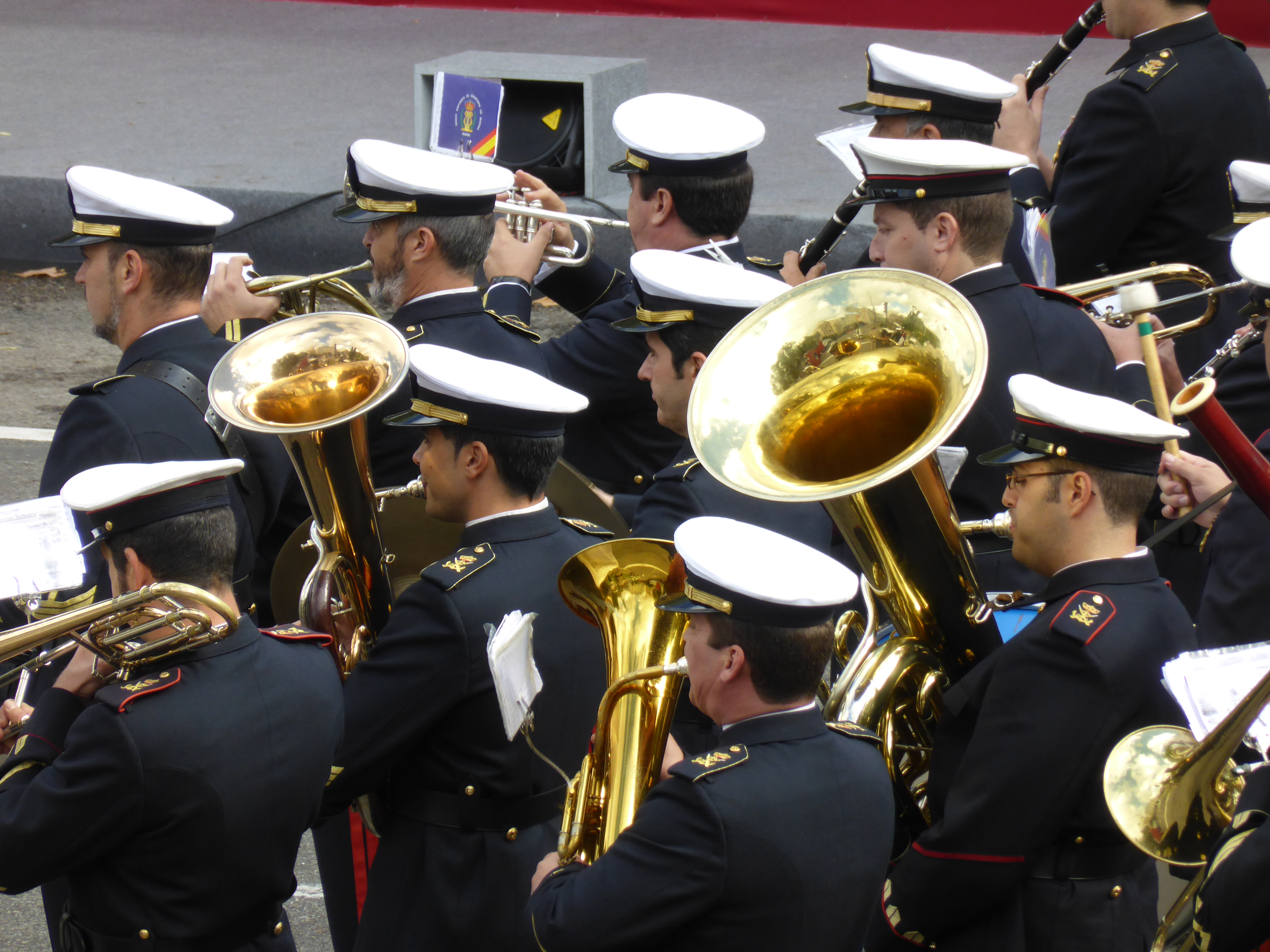
The band on Spanish National Day.

The Music Band of the Marines is the military band of the Marine Infantry and the larger Spanish Navy. For this, it has the Music Band, created in 1950, it is made up of a select group of non-commissioned officers and professional musicians. Its first performance was in the Paseo de la Castellana in Madrid on 1 April 1951. It marches in both military ceremonies and parades, as well as in civil events. Based in Madrid it serves as the successor to bands of both that service and the whole of the Navy. The Madrid Marine Corps Battalion (AGRUMAD) Music Band, also based in Madrid, also serves this branch. Since 1990, which was the year of its reestablishment, it has participated in concerts organized by the aforementioned association as well as military festivals in Spain. In 1970, it performed in the International Contest of Military Music Bands held in Valencia in 1970, in which its bandsmen obtained 1st prize. It also has taken part in foreign activities in neighboring countries such as Belgium.

== Uniforms ==
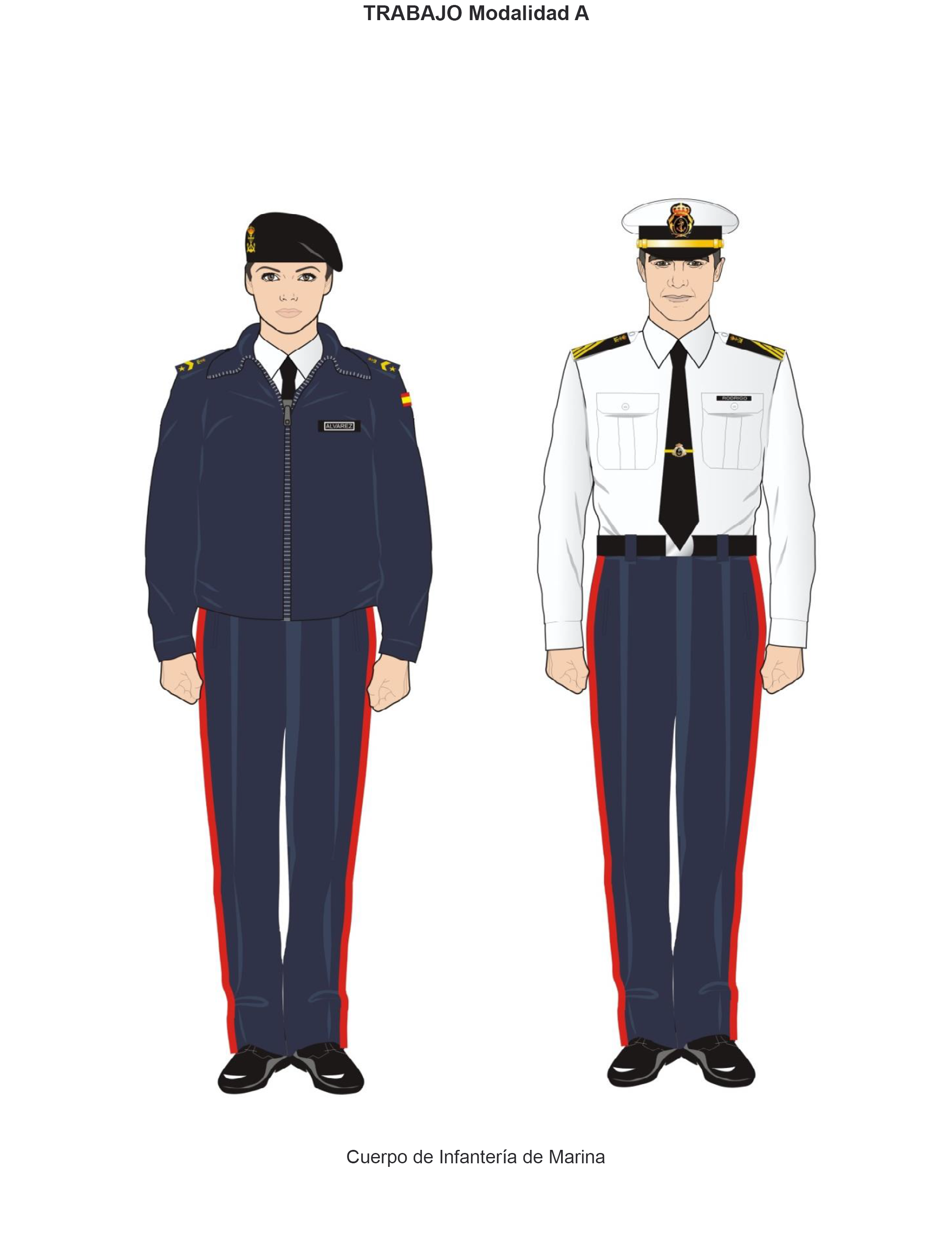
Barrack Dress A

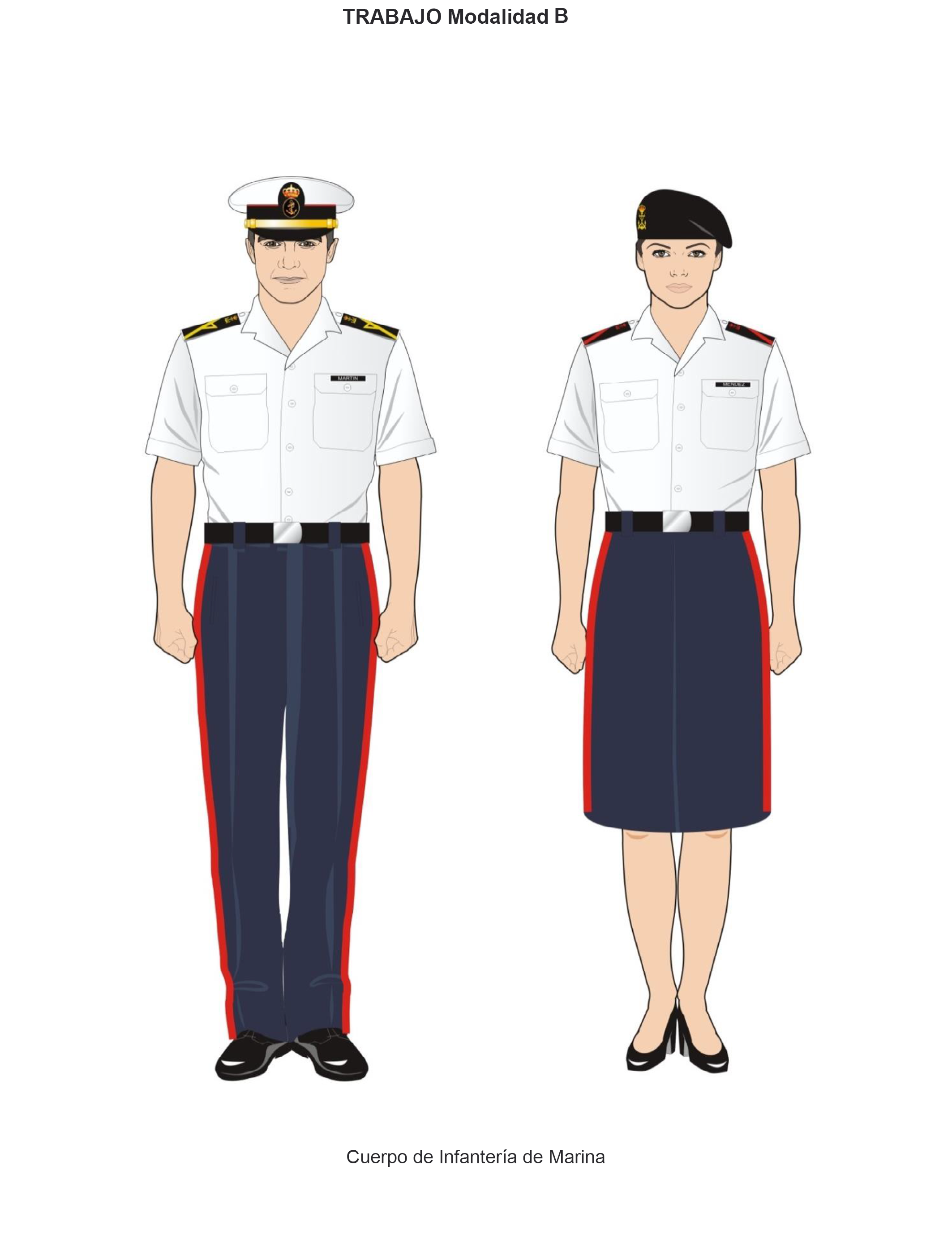
Barrack Dress B

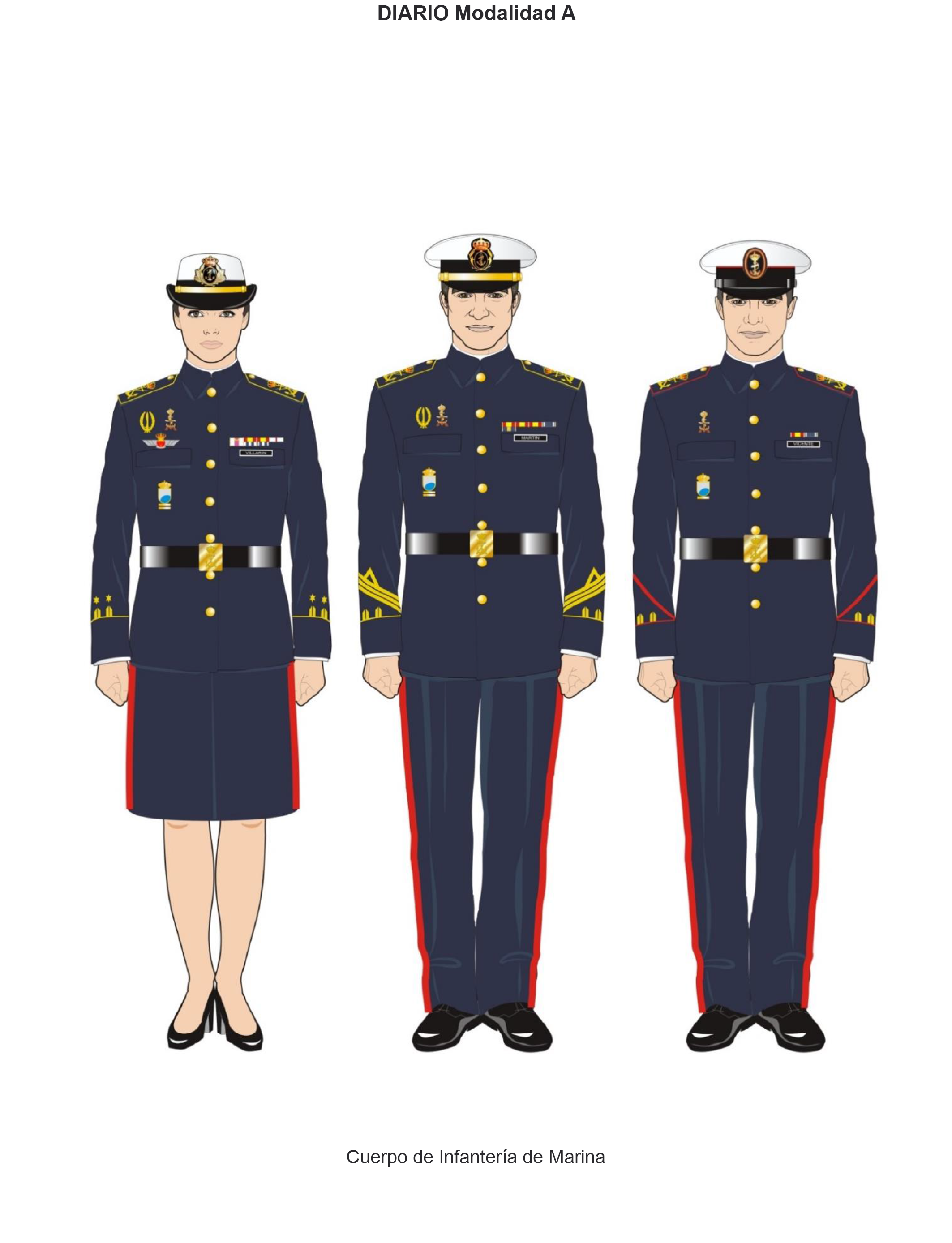
Service Dress A

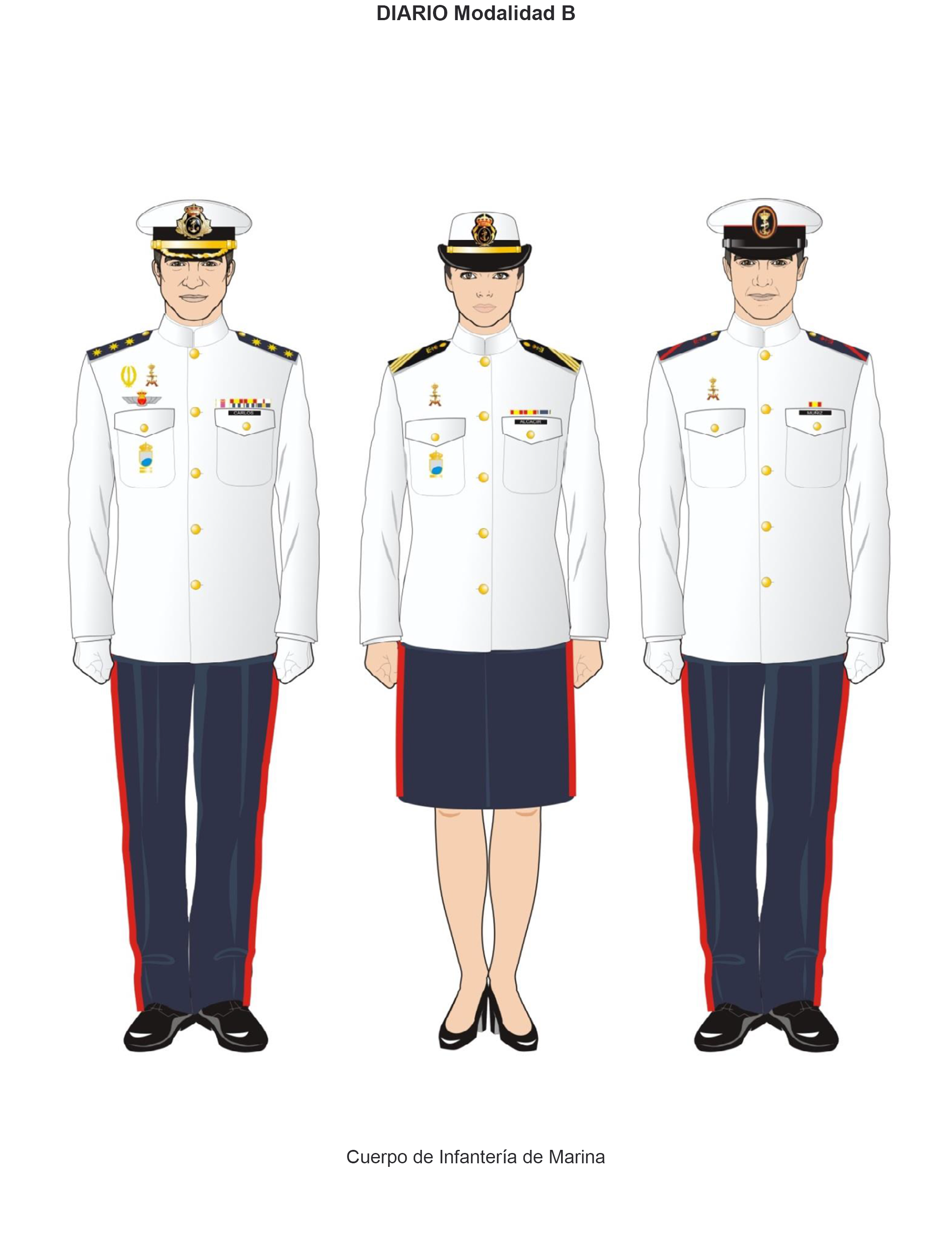
Service Dress B

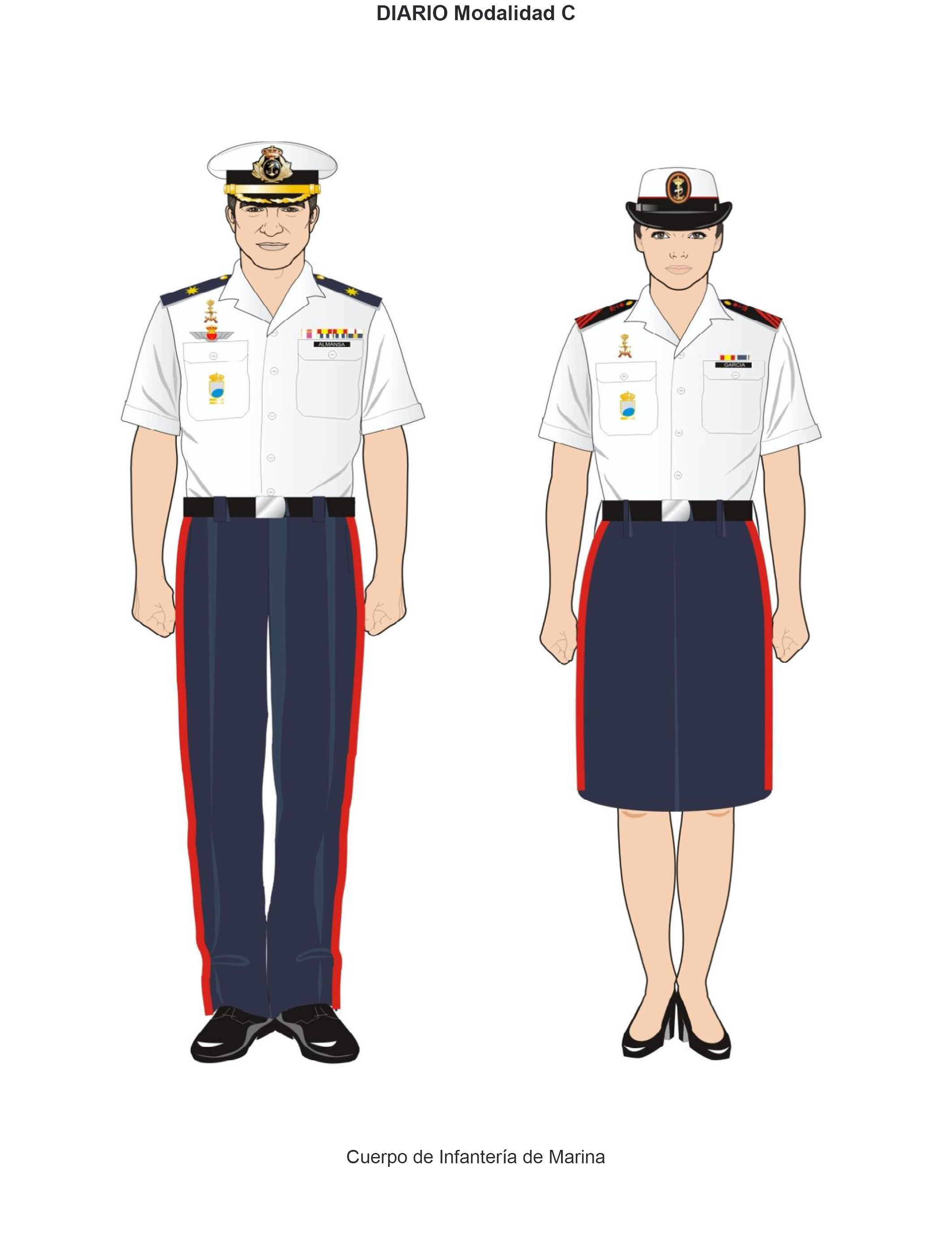
Service Dress C

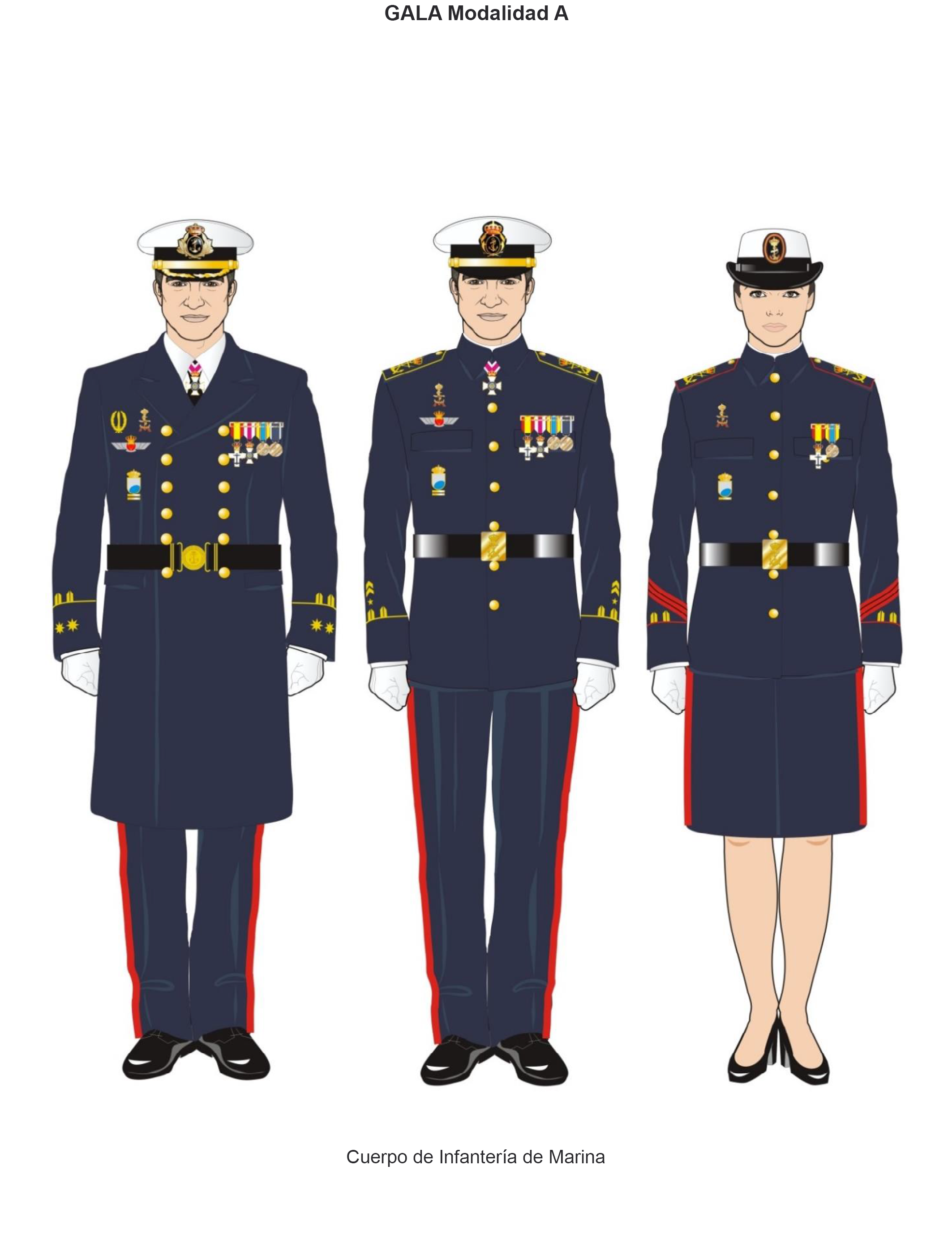
Dress Uniform A

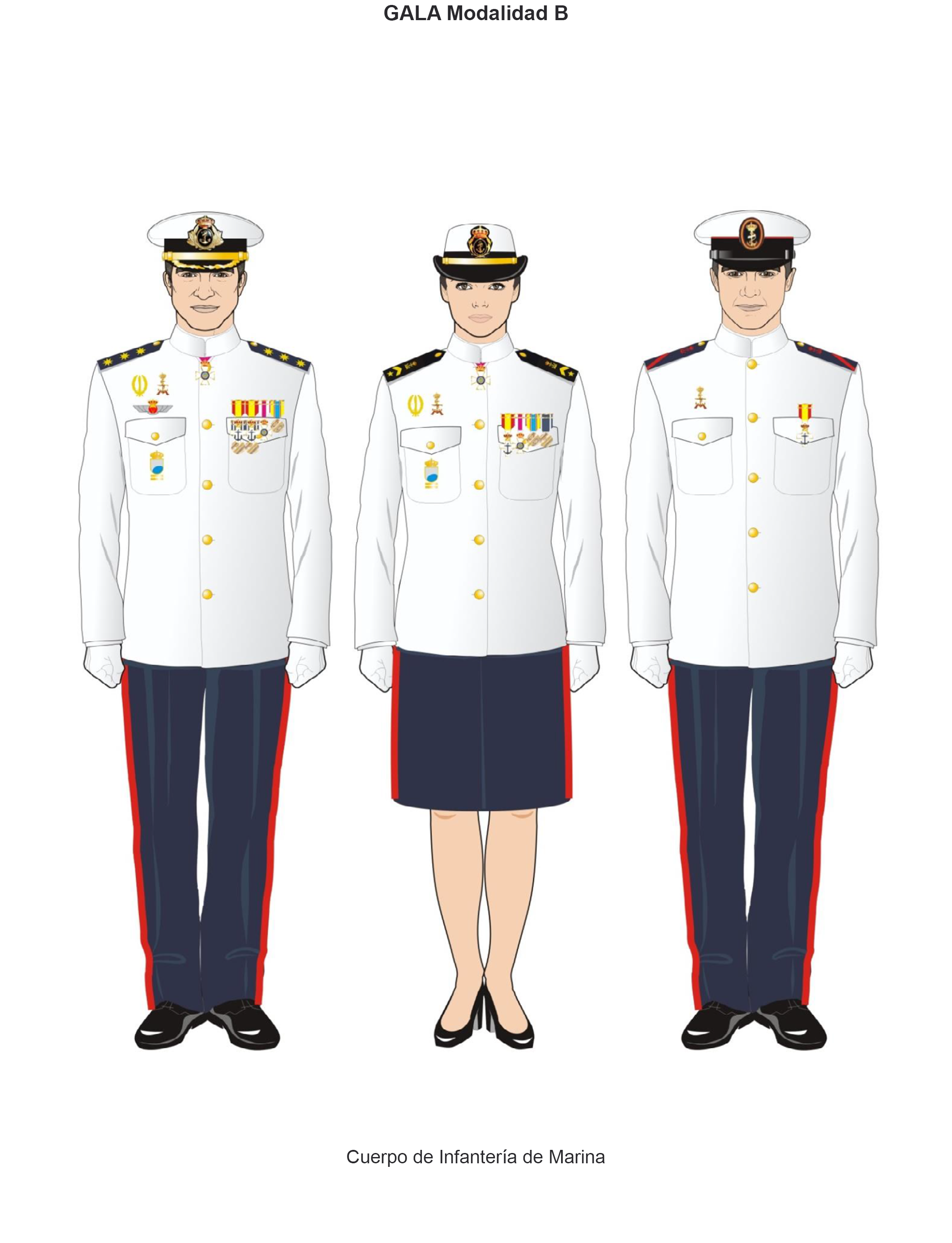
Dress Uniform B

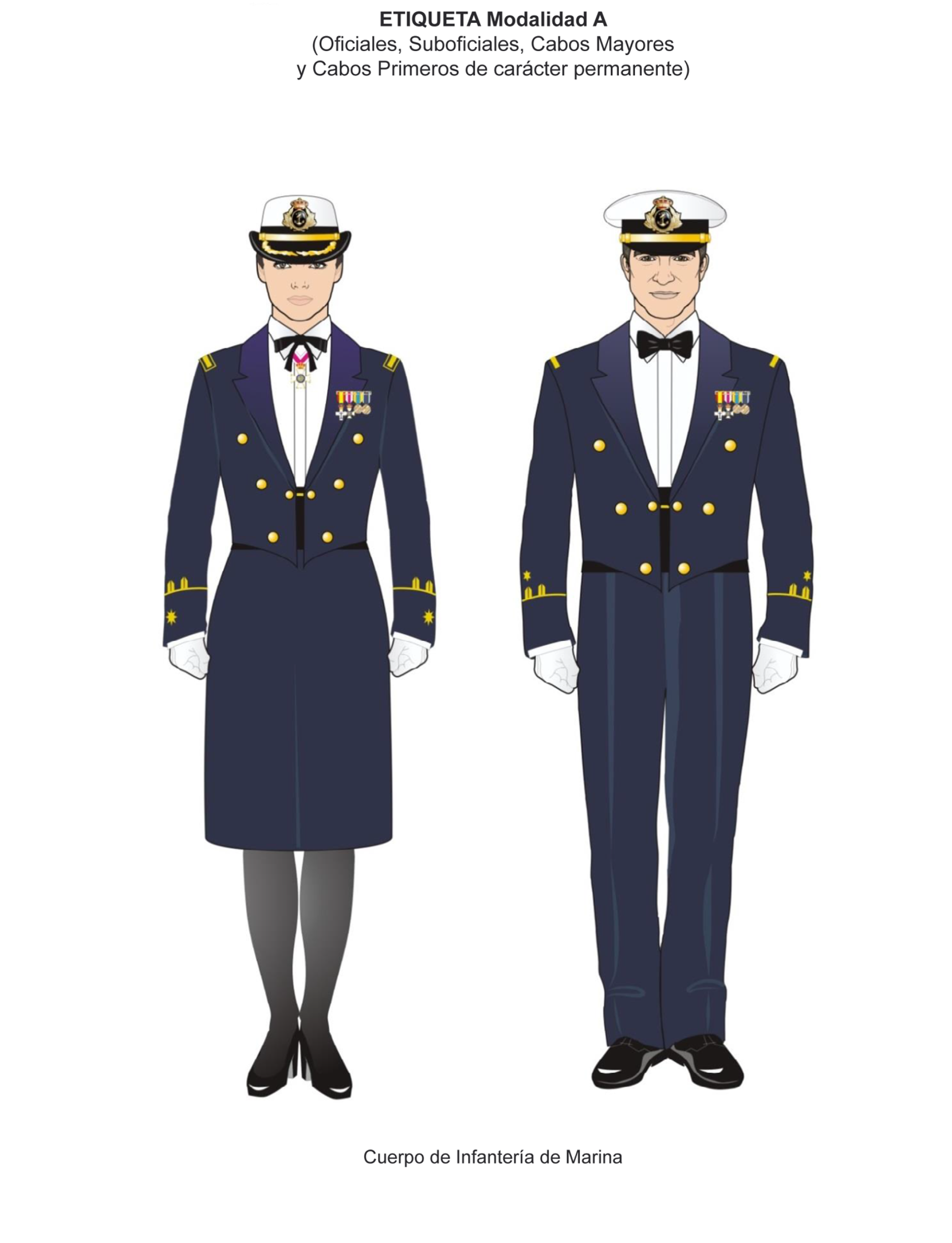
Mess Dress A

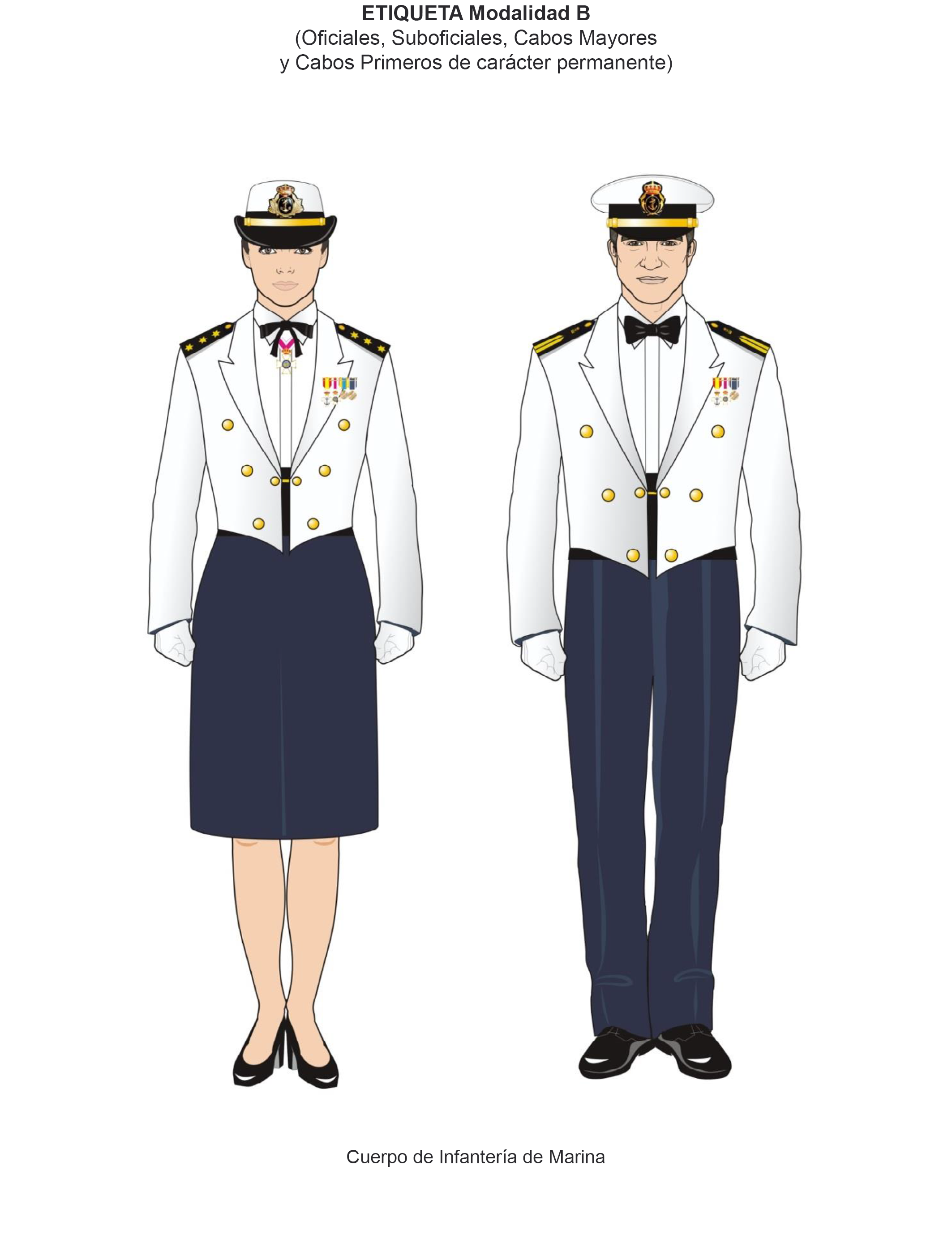
Mess Dress B

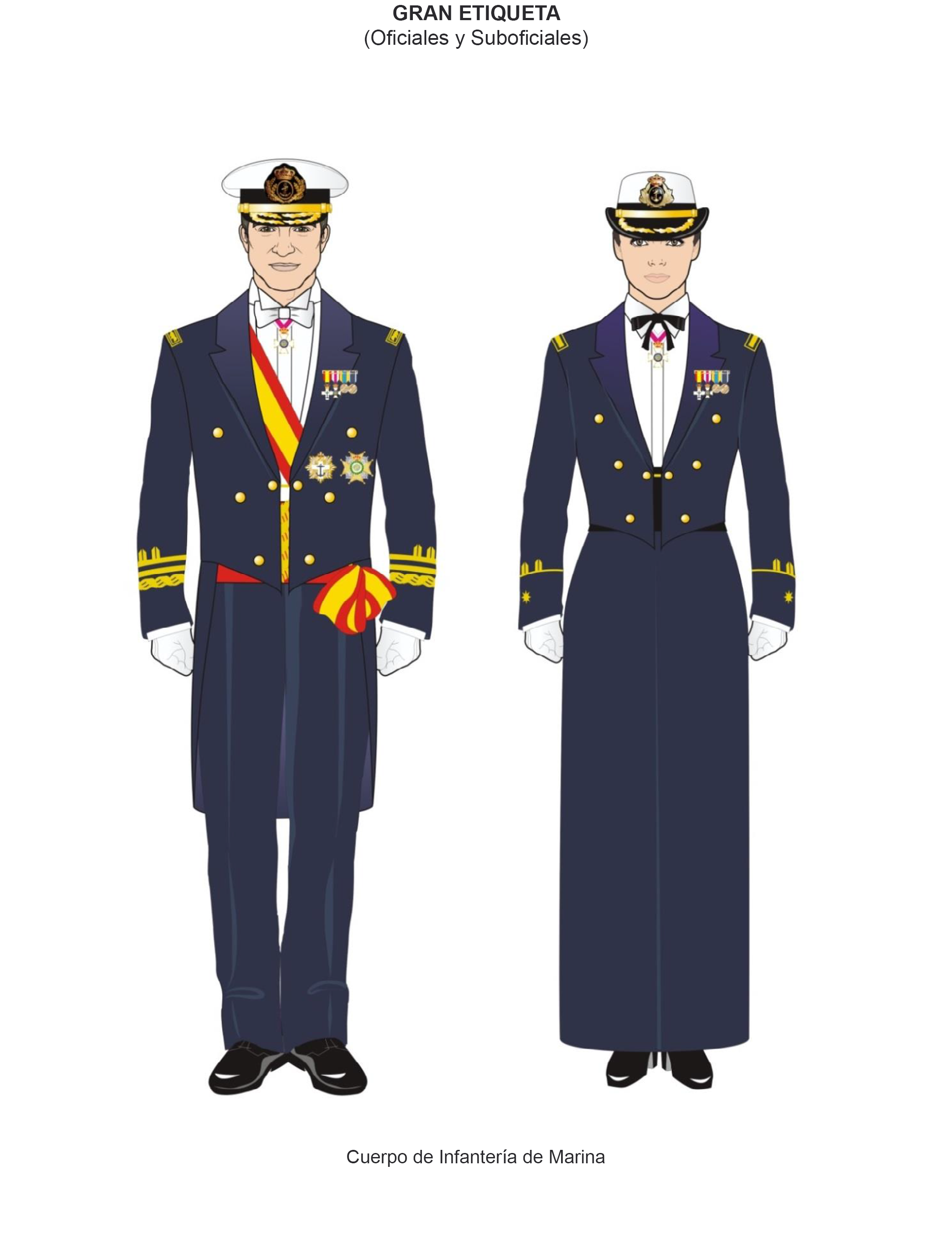
Ceremonial Dress

== See also ==
- Marine (military)
- Unidad de Operaciones Especiales (UOE)
- Alonso Pita da Veiga at the "Battle of Pavia" captured King Francis I of France (1513–1525)
- Miguel de Cervantes Spain's most famous Marine, injured at the Battle of Lepanto (1571), where the Spanish marines played a decisive part.
- Salve Marinera, Spanish Navy anthem. Some of its best versions are sung by choruses of the Infantería de Marina
- Armada of Spain
- Spanish Republican Navy
