= Spanish special operations =

Spanish special operations forces

Spain has a long history of combating domestic and international violence and of training units for special warfare or intervention. The following military and police units currently operate under a Special Operations mandate:

Navy

- Fuerza de Guerra Naval Especial (FGNE) (Special Naval Warfare Force)

Army

- Mando de Operaciones Especiales (MOE) (Special Operations Command)
  - Grupo de Operaciones Especiales

Air Force

- Escuadrón de Zapadores Paracaidistas (EZAPAC)

== See also ==
- List of special forces units
