= Special Naval Warfare Force =

Spanish Navy military unit

- Fuerza de Guerra Naval Especial
- Shield of the FGNE
- Active: 10 June 2009
- Country: Spain
- Branch: Spanish Navy
- Type: Special forces
- Role: Special operations
- Part of: Spanish Marine Infantry
- Garrison/HQ: La Algameca Naval Station, Cartagena, Murcia, Spain
- Nicknames: Hombres rana (Frogmen), Boinas verdes (Green Berets)
- Motto: Serenitas et audacia

Commanders
- Current commander: Ilmo. Sr.Colonel D. Vicente Gonzalvo Navarro

The Special Naval Warfare Force (Spanish: Fuerza de Guerra Naval Especial, FGNE) is the special forces unit of the Spanish Navy. It was created on June 10, 2009, through the fusion of the Special Operations Unit (UOE) of the Spanish Navy Marines and the Special Combat Divers Unit (UEBC) of the Navy Diving Center. Before the merger, between 2004 and 2009, the two units operated under a single Special Naval Warfare Command. Between 1967 and 2009, the special operations of the Spanish Navy were conducted by the UOE, whose many traditions the FGNE adopted – including the use of the special forces "green beret", the Capacitación selection course, and the organization of operational units into Estoles. Inheriting the reputation and continuing the record of the UOE, the FGNE "has long been one of Europe's most respected special forces."

== Mission and organization ==
The Special Naval Warfare Force is the special forces unit of the Spanish Navy specialized in operations in maritime, land and coastal environments. The unit is composed mainly of members of the Marines.

It is composed of a Command and Control unit, a support unit for the Command and Control unit, combat units and their support units, and the services combat units (health, supply, transportation, weapons, material, etc.).

Jobs assigned to them:

- Reconnaissance of maritime coastlines and beaches
- Inland reconnaissance in depth
- Direct actions on terrestrial targets, such as the destruction of enemy installations or the capture of enemy personnel
- Assault on ships
- Military assistance
- Non-combatants evacuation operations
- Hostage rescue
- Counter-insurgency and counter-terrorism operations

=== Commander ===
The Special Naval Warfare Force is under the command of a colonel or a ship-of-the-line captain who receives the title of Commander of the Special Naval Warfare Force. As a force integrated into the Spanish Marines, it is under the purview of the General Commander of the Marines.

== Deployments ==
The FGNE has been deployed across several operations, including Atalanta in Somalia, United Nations Interim Force in Lebanon and Hispaniola in Haiti.

The Special Naval Warfare Force also took part during the hijacking of the Spanish fishing vessel Alakrana in October 2009, parachuting into Somali waters and being recovered after by the frigate Canarias.

They have also seen action in Iraq and Afghanistan as well as being deployed to Senegal and Cape Verde.

== Equipment ==
- SIG Sauer P230
- Llama M82
- FN P9-17
- Glock 17 Gen.5
- FN Five-seven
- FN P90
- Heckler & Koch MP5A3/A4/A5
- Heckler & Koch MP5SD3/SD4/SD5
- Heckler & Koch G-36E/K/C
- SIG 553
- Heckler & Koch HK-416A5 11"
- CETME C
- CETME L/LC/LV
- Remington 870
- FN Minimi Para 5.56mm
- FN Minimi MK3 7.62mm
- MK46, MK48 mod 0
- CETME Ameli
- M-60D
- Rheinmetall MG3
- Accuracy International Arctic Warfare
- AXMC .338
- Barrett M82A1/M95
- Heckler & Koch HK-417 12" ASSAULTER and 20" SNIPER
- Rocket launcher C-100
- Rocket launcher C-90C
- Mk.19 Mod.3 grenade launcher
