= Operación Hispaniola =

Operación Hispaniola (Operation Hispaniola) was Spain's military relief operation for Haiti, following the 12 January 2010 earthquake. The mission was expected to last until at least 4 May 2010.

The headquarters for the mission was the SPS Castilla. Their encampment at Petit-Goâve was named "Camp Gloria".

== Force composition ==
- Castilla, an amphibious assault ship
  - Castilla's complement:
    - 4 helicopters
    - Fast boats
  - Transported on Castilla:
    - Field hospital
    - 423 ground troops
      - Engineering unit
        - Bulldozers
      - Logistics unit
        - 2 water purification units
    - 50 medical officers
      - 28 doctors and nurses
    - 23 Guardia Civil
- 37 members of the Unidad Militar de Emergencias

== Mission timeline ==
On 17 January 2010, the Unidad de Emergencias Militares (UME) arrived to help. It was the first deployment of the UME outside of Spanish territory.

On 19 January 2010, it was announced that Castilla would transport a field hospital, 50 medical officers, 450 troops. Also on board are three helicopters, and several fast boats.

On 21 January 2010, the mission for the 37 members of the Unidad de Emergencias Militares (UME) ended.

Castilla left Rota (Province of Cádiz) on 22 January 2010, carrying 23 members of the Guardia Civil, 423 troops, and 4 helicopters, headed for Petit-Goâve, Haiti.

On 29 January 2010, the first six troopers of the expanded mission arrived in Port-au-Prince.

On 1 February 2010, Castilla arrives at San Juan in Puerto Rico to pick up additional supplies.

On 4 February 2010, Castilla arrives at Petit-Goâve. 350 people were treated, and 2 surgeries performed at the onboard sickbay.

As of 5 February 2010, landing craft from the ship have started disgorging equipment. Spanish military sappers have started to clear the road to Port-au-Prince, which had been covered by landslides.

Castilla is expected to remain on-station at Petit-Goâve for three months.

As of 7 February 2010, the Spanish medical team has been using the hospital in Petit-Goâve, Notre Dame de Petit-Goâve.

On 9 February 2010, 10 kilolitres of water were distributed. The water purification plants have been producing 12 kL of water per day.

As of 11 February 2010, 155 patients have been treated, 144 tonnes of aid have been delivered.

As of 15 March 2010, the Spanish frigate Álvaro de Bazán, delivered supplies and fresh personnel.
