= Unidad de Operaciones Especiales =

Special Operations Unit
- Unidad de Operaciones Especiales
- Spanish UOE Insignia
- Active: 1952 (officially 1967) – 2009
- Country: Spain
- Branch: Spanish Navy and Marines
- Type: Special Forces
- Role: Maritime Special Operations
- Size: 170 (approx.)
- Part of: Naval Special Warfare Command
- Garrison/HQ: Tercio de Armada
- Nickname(s): La Unidad (The Unit); Boinas Verdes (Green Berets)
- Motto(s): "Entra quien puede, no quien quiere" Enter those who can, not those who want

The Special Operations Unit (Spanish: Unidad de Operaciones Especiales, UOE) was the elite special operations force of the Spanish Navy and marines from 1967 to 2009. In June 2009, the unit was absorbed into the newly formed Special Naval Warfare Force, which inherited the reputation and which continues the record of the UOE. The UOE was formerly garrisoned in the Tercio de Armada in San Fernando, Cádiz and operated under the direct control of the Admiralty and Special Naval Warfare Command. It was thought to comprise approximately 100 men organized into three Operational Teams (Estoles) as well as command and support personnel. The unit (and today's FGNE) has long been one of Europe's most respected special forces.

The UOE was tasked with Special Operations in maritime, coastal, and inland environments usually up to 50 km from the sea, though this was not a restriction and its teams were known to operate deep inland. The unit's remit covered all aspects of modern Naval Special Warfare, including: Maritime Counter-Terrorism, ship boarding (MIO non-compliant), combat diving and swimming, coastal infiltration, airborne insertion, special reconnaissance, direct action, VIP protection and escort, and combat search and rescue (CSAR).

For these purposes, the UOE employed a wide range of naval and other military platforms, including submarines, frigates, soft- and rigid-hull inflatable boats, land vehicles, as well as helicopters and airplanes for airborne insertions.

== History ==
Origins of the UOE. (Source: Armada Española)

La Unidad ("The Unit"), as it was informally known in Spain, traces its roots to the Amphibious Climbing Company (Compañía de Escaladores Anfibios), established in 1952 as an all-volunteer unit tasked with coastal assaults and infiltration. In 1967, using the US Navy SEALs and British SBS as its guides, the unit expanded its mandate and range of skills to include combat diving, underwater demolitions, airborne insertions and direct action missions. In 1985 the UOE was re-designated COMANFES (Comando Anfibio Especial), but reverted to its original name in the early 1990s. Today, the unit is one of two operational elements within the Spanish Navy's Naval Special Warfare Force.

The UOE collaborated and trained closely with similar NATO units, such as the United States Navy SEALs, the Italian Navy's COMSUBIN, the French Commando Hubert, and the Portuguese DAE, as well as with special intervention units of the Spanish police forces (UEI and GEO).

The UOE and its parent Naval Special Warfare Force are one of only three units in the Spanish military formally tasked with Special Operations, along with the Army's MOE and the Air Force's EZAPAC.

== Selection and training ==
UOE commandos rendezvous with a submarine.

After completing basic training and having served in a conventional unit, candidates aspiring to attain the "green beret" must undergo comprehensive medical and psychological reviews as well as physical trials, and then, if approved, pass a selection course (Capacitación). The course is divided into Basic and Advanced phases and is staffed exclusively by UOE officers and NCOs, all of them fully qualified in special operations.

The Basic phase lasts for about four weeks and is aimed at testing the physical and psychological endurance of candidates through a grueling combination of intense physical exercise, long-distance marches carrying up to 50 kilograms (110 lb) of weight, and numerous trials at sea and in mountain environments. The Advanced phase of selection lasts for about two months and, though the physical rigor of the course steadily increases, candidates also receive more specific training in basic naval commando skills:

- Combat swimming
- Small-craft navigation
- Shipboarding
- Mountaineering and rappelling
- Demolitions
- Marksmanship
- Communications
- Hostage rescue
- Orienteering
- Escape and evasion in enemy territory
- Land/maritime survival techniques
- Battlefield medicine

Candidates are free to drop out of the course at any moment, from the first day to the last. Though some drop-outs result from physical injury (or even death), most instances are voluntary. The attrition rate for the UOE selection process can occasionally be as high as 100% and averages from 70 to 80%—the highest failure rate of any course in the Spanish armed forces. It is not uncommon that by the end of the course the instructor-candidate ratio is 3:1. The unit's harsh entrance criteria have furnished its official motto, "Entra quien puede, no quien quiere" ("He who can enters, not he who wants").

Successful candidates are immediately sent to parachuting school on arrival at the UOE and proceed to more advanced and specialized training in Naval Special Warfare skills (diving, sniping, intelligence, etc.).

== Deployments ==
UOE team boards North Korean vessel. (Source: Armada Española)

The UOE always maintains one of its three operational teams on maximum alert (Alpha-1) for immediate deployment on a rotational basis.

The UOE was first deployed overseas in 1969, just two years after it was founded, when it spearheaded the evacuation of Spanish citizens from the former Spanish colony of Equatorial Guinea in Africa. Since then, the unit has been reported to have participated in the fight against Basque ETA violence inside Spain (though today this is strictly the preserve of civilian police forces).

More recently, among its publicly known missions, the UOE was deployed to the former Yugoslavia as part of the Spanish IFOR and SFOR contingents. Also, in December 2002, while participating in Operation Enduring Freedom in the Indian Ocean, UOE commandos stormed a suspect North Korean vessel, the So San, transporting a shipment of SCUD missiles destined for Yemen. The unit is also known to have recently deployed its teams on undisclosed missions in the Middle East.

The UOE is a central element of the Spanish Maritime counter-terrorism capability.

== Weapons ==
UOE commandos with German Heckler & Koch G36KE carbines.

Weapons held at the UOE armory include, but are not limited to, the following:

- Sound-suppressed SIG Sauer P230 pistol
- Sound-suppressed Sterling submachine gun
- MP5 and MP5SD submachine guns
- HK G36E assault rifle
- HK G36KE carbine
- M16 assault rifle
- Remington 870 shotgun
- FN MINIMI machine gun
- Ameli light machine gun
- M60 machine gun
- MG3 machine gun
- Accuracy AW sniper rifle
- Barrett M95 heavy sniper rifle
- HK 416 assault rifle

== See also ==
- Spanish special forces units
