= Abd al-Aziz =

- Gender: Male
- Language: Arabic

Origin
- Meaning: Servant of (the Almighty) Allah

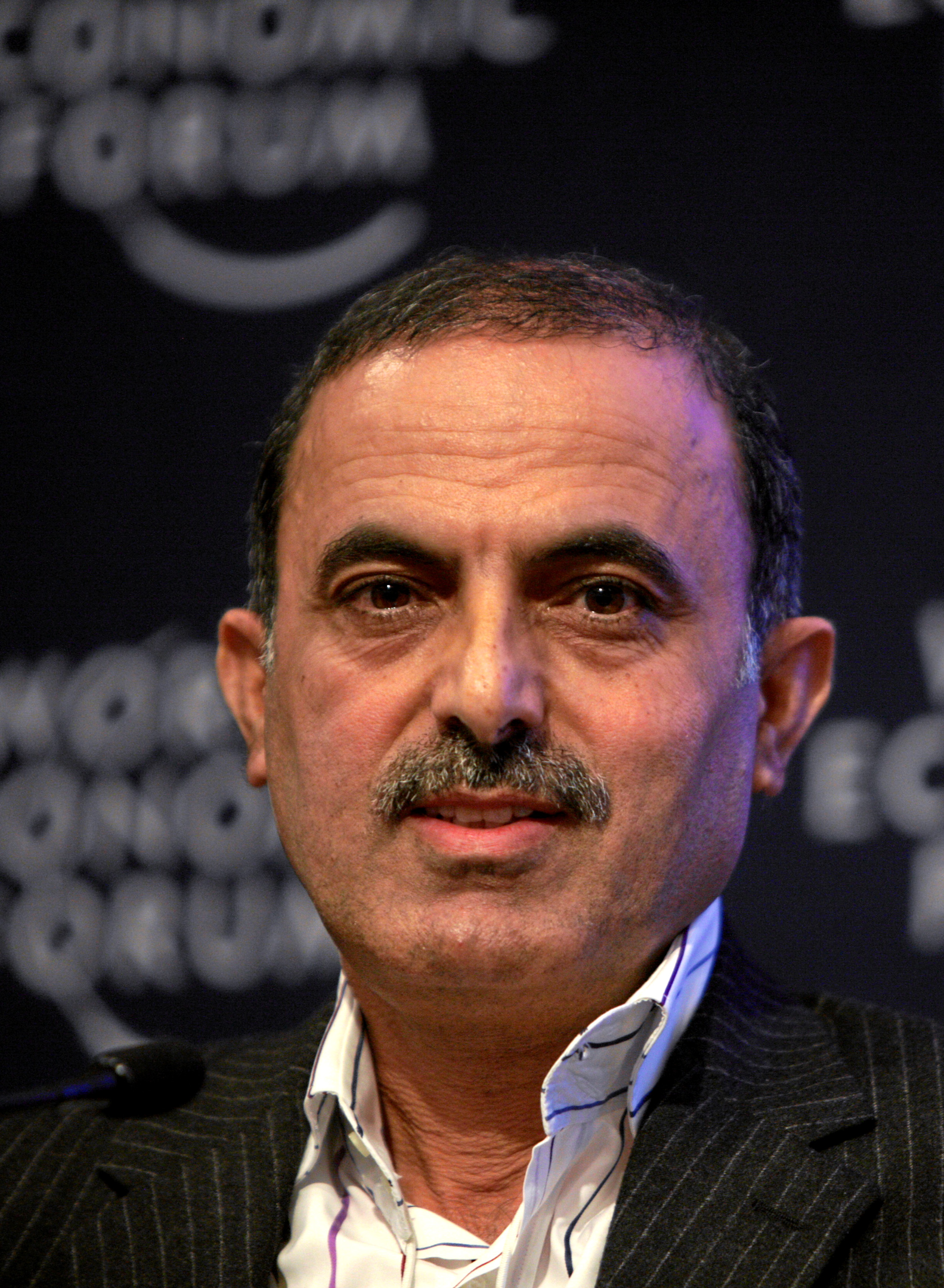
Abdulaziz Alghurair, Speaker, Federal National Council, United Arab Emirates, 2009

Abd al-Aziz (Arabic: عبد العزيز, DMG: ʽAbd al-ʽAzīz), frequently also transliterated Abdul Aziz, is a masculine given name of Arabic origin. It is built from the words ʽAbd, the Arabic definite article and ʽAzīz "Almighty". The name is commonly abbreviated as "ʽAzīz". The name means "servant of the Almighty", al-ʽAzīz being one of the names of God in Islam, which give rise to the Muslim theophoric names. The letter a of the al- is unstressed, and can be transliterated by almost any vowel, often by u. So the first part can appear as Abdel, without spacing and hyphenation. Abdelaziz (with an e) is the most common transliteration of the name in the Maghreb. Notable people with the name include:

== Given name ==
=== Abd al-Aziz ===
- Abd al-Aziz II ibn Ahmad II (1375–1396), Marinid Sultan
- Abd al Aziz al-Amawi (1832–1896), Somali diplomat, historian, poet, jurist, and scholar
- Abd al-Aziz ibn Umar ibn Abd al-Aziz, Umayyad governor of Medina and Mecca
- Abd al-Aziz ibn Abd Allah ibn Baaz (1910–1999), Saudi Islamic scholar
- Abd al-Aziz al-Dabbagh (1684–1718/19), Moroccan Sufi mystic, ascetic, and Islamic scholar
- Abd Al-Aziz Fawzan Al-Fawzan (born 1964), Saudi writer and televisor
- Abd al-Aziz al-Fishtali (1549–1621), Moroccan poet and historian
- Abd al-Aziz al-Ghumari (1920–1997), Moroccan Islamic scholar
- Abd al-Aziz ibn Idris ibn Hasan (died 1652/53), co-ruler of the Sharifate of Mecca
- Abd al-Aziz Khan (Bukhara) (1614–1683), Khan of Bukhara
- Abd al-Aziz al-Mansur (1005–1061), king of the Taifa of Valencia
- Abd al-Aziz ibn Mansur (1088–1121), ruler of the Hammadids
- Abd al-Aziz al-Maqdishawi, Somali ruler of Kinolhas, Maldives
- Abd al-Aziz ibn Marwan (died 705), Umayyad prince and governor of Egypt
- Abd al-Aziz ibn Musa (died 716), Umayyad governor of Al-Andalus
- Abd Al Aziz Muhammad Ibrahim Al Nasir (born 1980), Saudi Guantanamo prisoner
- Abd al-Aziz ibn Nuh, Emir of the Samanids
- Abd al-Aziz al-Rifa'i (1924–1993), Saudi writer and poet
- Abd al-Aziz ibn Shaddad, Zirid chronicler and prince
- Abd Al Aziz Sayer Uwain Al Shammeri (born 1973), Kuwaiti Guantanamo prisoner
- Abd al-Aziz ibn Shu'ayb, Emir of Crete
- Abd al-Aziz al-Tarifi (born 1976), Saudi Islamic scholar
- Abd al-Aziz ibn al-Walid (died 728/29), Umayyad prince
- Ali Abd-al-Aziz al-Isawi (born 1962), Libyan politician
- Mahmoud Abd Al Aziz Abd Al Mujahid (born 1977), Yemeni Guantanamo prisoner

=== Abd el-Aziz ===
- Abd El Aziz Seif-Eldeen (born 1949), Egyptian Lieutenant General
- Abd-El-Aziz Yousef (born 1999), Somali footballer
- Abd el-Aziz el-Zoubi (1926–1974), Israeli Arab politician

=== Abdel Aziz ===
- Abdelaziz of Morocco (1878–1943), Sultan of Morocco
- Abdelaziz Ou Abbas (died 1559), Sultan of the Kingdom of Ait Abbas
- Abdelaziz Abbès (born 1963), Algerian football manager
- Abdel Aziz Ben Abdallah (born 1964), Tunisian volleyball player
- Abdelaziz Ahanfouf (born 1978), German-Moroccan footballer
- Abdelaziz Mohamed Ahmed (born 1994), Sudanese swimmer
- Abdelaziz Barrada (1989–2024), Moroccan footballer
- Abdelaziz Meziane Belfqih (1944–2010), Moroccan civil servant
- Abdelaziz Belkhadem (born 1945), Algerian politician
- Abdelaziz Benhamlat (born 1974), Algerian footballer
- Abdelaziz Benjelloun (1934–2008), Moroccan politician
- Abdelaziz Bennani (1935–2015), Moroccan Army officer
- Abdelaziz Bennij (born 1965), Moroccan footballer
- Abdelaziz Bougja, French Rugby union executive
- Abdel Aziz Boulehia (born 1970), Algerian boxer
- Abdel Aziz Bousarsar (born 1948), Tunisian volleyball player
- Abdelaziz Bouteflika (1937–2021), Algerian politician
- Abdel Aziz Derbal (born 1952), Tunisian volleyball player
- Abdelaziz Ben Dhia (1936–2015), Tunisian politician
- Abdelaziz Djerad (born 1954), Algerian politician and diplomat
- Abdelaziz Dnibi (born 1975), Moroccan footballer
- Abdelaziz Drissi-Kacemi, Moroccan scouting executive
- Abdel Aziz Emam (born 1989), Egyptian footballer
- Abdelaziz Errachidi (born 1978), Moroccan writer
- Abdel Aziz Essafoui (born 1970), Moroccan wrestler
- Abdelaziz Gorgi (1928–2008), Tunisian artist
- Abdelaziz Guechir (born 1968), Algerian footballer
- Abdelaziz Ali Guechi (born 1990), Algerian footballer
- Abdelaziz Guerda (1946–2026), Algerian actor
- Abdel-Aziz bin Habtour (born 1955), Yemeni politician
- Abdel Aziz El-Hammami, Egyptian footballer
- Abdel Aziz Hammi (born 1949), Tunisian boxer
- Abdel Aziz Mohamed Hegazy (1923–2014), Egyptian politician
- Abdelaziz al-Hilu (born 1954), Sudanese politician
- Abdelaziz El Idrissi (born 1986), Moroccan long-distance runner
- Abdelaziz Kamara (born 1984), French-Mauritanian footballer
- Abdel Aziz Khoja (born 1942), Saudi diplomat
- Abdelaziz al-Maghrawi (died 1605), Moroccan poet
- Abdel Aziz Makhyoun (1946–2026), Egyptian actor
- Abdelaziz al-Malzuzi (died 1298), Moroccan poet and historian
- Abdel-Aziz Mehelba (born 1988), Egyptian sports shooter
- Abdelaziz Merzougui (born 1991), Spanish runner
- Abdelaziz Mitwali (born 1996), Egyptian footballer
- Abdelaziz Mohamed (born 2001), Qatari sprinter
- Abdel Aziz Moussa (footballer) (born 1989), Egyptian footballer
- Abdel Aziz El Mubarak (1951–2020), Sudanese singer
- Abdel Aziz al-Muqrin (1971–2004), Saudi alleged terrorist
- Abdelaziz Kareem Salim al-Noofayee, Saudi Guantanamo prisoner
- Abdelaziz bin Rashid Al Nuaimi (died 1848), Ruler of Ajman
- Abdelaziz El Omari (born 1968), Moroccan politician
- Abdel Aziz al-Rantissi (1947–2004), Palestinian political leader
- Abdelaziz Sahere (born 1967), Moroccan runner
- Abdelaziz Baraka Sakin (born 1963), Sudanese fiction writer
- Abdel Aziz Salem (1895–??), Egyptian engineer
- Abdelaziz Sanqour (born 1989), Emirati footballer
- Abdelaziz Sfar (1939–2012), Tunisian handball player
- Abdel Aziz El-Shafei (born 1931), Egyptian swimmer
- Abdel Aziz Abdel Shafy (born 1952), Egyptian manager and football director
- Abdelaziz Souleimani (born 1958), Moroccan footballer
- Abdelaziz Stati (born 1961), Moroccan singer
- Abdel Aziz Tahir (born 1961), Moroccan wrestler
- Abdelaziz Tawfik (born 1986), Egyptian footballer
- Abdelaziz al-Tebaa (died 1499), Moroccan Sufi
- Abdelaziz Thâalbi (1876–1944), Tunisian politician
- Abdelaziz bin Ahmed Al Thani (1945–2008), Qatari prince
- Abdelaziz bin Khalifa Al Thani (born 1946), Qatari prince
- Abdelaziz Ben Tifour (1927–1970), Algerian footballer
- Abdelaziz Touilbini (born 1978), Algerian boxer
- Abdel Aziz Zaibi (1953–2020), Tunisian handball player
- Abdelaziz Ziari (born 1945), Algerian politician and doctor
- Mohamed Abdelaziz Tchikou (born 1985), Algerian footballer
- Nasr Abdel Aziz Eleyan (born 1941), Palestinian artist

=== Abdol Aziz ===
- Abdol-Aziz Mirza Farmanfarmaian (1920–2013), Iranian architect

=== Abdoul Aziz ===
- Abdoul Aziz Diallo, Guinean politician
- Abdoul Aziz Gassama (born 2003), French footballer
- Abdoul Aziz Hamza (born 1982), Nigerian footballer
- Abdoul Aziz Ibrahim (born 1996), Nigerien footballer
- Abdoul Aziz Kaboré (born 1994), Burkinabe footballer
- Abdoul Aziz Mbaye (1954–2021), Senegalese politician and diplomat
- Abdoul Aziz Ndaw (1922–2011), Senegalese politician
- Abdoul-Aziz Nikiema (born 1985), Burkinabe footballer

=== Abdul Azeez ===
- Abdul-Azeez Olajide Adediran (born 1977), Nigerian politician, journalist, entrepreneur, and technocrat
- Abdul Azeez Kolawole Adeyemo (1941–2002), Nigerian politician
- Abdulazeez Ibrahim (1957–2021), Nigerian politician
- Abdulazeez Idris (born 1970), Nigerian politician
- Abdul Azeez Madani (1950–2022), Indian Islamic scholar
- Abdulazeez Owolabi (born 2000), Nigerian footballer
- Abdul Azeez Abdul Rahim (born 1966), Malaysian politician and businessman

=== Abdul Aziz ===
- Abdul Aziz (filmmaker) (born 1975), Bangladeshi film producer and script writer
- Abdul Aziz (footballer, born 1986) (born 1986), Pakistani footballer
- Abdul Aziz (footballer, born 1994) (born 1994), Indonesian footballer
- Abdul Aziz (general), Pakistani Army general
- Abdul Aziz (Indian politician) (born 1969), Indian politician
- Abdul Aziz (Indonesian politician) (born 1970), Indonesian politician
- Abdul Aziz (Khyber Pakhtunkhwa cricketer) (born 1992), Pakistani cricketer
- Abdul Aziz (Natore politician) (born 1959), Bangladeshi politician
- Abdul Aziz (secretary), Bangladeshi politician
- Abdul Aziz (Sindh cricketer) (1941−1959), Pakistani cricketer
- Abdul Aziz (Sirajganj politician) (born 1963), Bangladesh politician
- Abdul Aziz (sprinter) (1924−??), Pakistani sprinter
- Abdul Aziz (Sri Lankan politician) (1912–1990), Indian-born Ceylonese politician
- Abdul Aziz (wrestler) (born 1935), Pakistani wrestler
- Abdul Aziz (writer) (1863–1926), Bangladeshi educator and writer
- Abdul Aziz of Perak (1887–1948), Sultan of Perak, Malaya
- Abdulaziz Al-Aazmi (born 1991), Saudi footballer
- Abdulaziz Al-Abduassalam, Saudi footballer
- Abdul Aziz bin Abdullah (born 1962), Saudi prince
- Abdulaziz AbdulNour (1850−1927), Ottoman judge, merchant, and philanthropist
- Abdulaziz Abdulrahman (born 1982), Saudi singer
- Abdul-Aziz Abdul-Shafi (born 1952), Egyptian football manager
- Abdul-Aziz Abdulvakhabov (born 1989), Russian mixed martial artist
- Abdul-Aziz Abood (born 1959), Tanzanian politician and businessman
- Abdul Aziz Abul, Bahraini politician
- Abdulaziz Adel (born 1993), Qatari footballer
- Abdul Aziz Ahmad (born 1954), Indonesian academician, bureaucrat, and diplomat
- Abdulaziz Al-Alawi (born 1998), Saudi footballer
- Abdulaziz Fayez Al Alawi (born 1990), Emirati footballer
- Abdulaziz Ali (born 1980), Qatari footballer
- Abdulaziz Al-Aliwa (born 2004), Saudi footballer
- Abdulaziz Abdulrahman Almusallam, Emirati novelist and writer
- Abdulaziz Alpak (born 1975), Turkish weightlifter
- Abdulaziz Alsibyani (born 1989), Saudi footballer
- Abdulaziz Al-Alwni (born 1989), Saudi football coach and futsal player
- Abdulaziz Al Anbari (born 1977), Emirati footballer
- Abdulaziz Al-Anberi (born 1954), Kuwaiti footballer
- Abdulaziz Al-Ansari (born 1992), Qatari footballer
- Abdulaziz Al-Aryani (born 1996), Saudi footballer
- Abdulaziz bin Mohammed Al Ateeqi (1882–1969), Saudi educator, historian, and politician
- Abdul Aziz Atta (1920–1972), Nigerian administrator
- Abdulaziz bin Khalifa al-Attiyah, Qatari terrorist
- Abdul Aziz Awda, Palestinian cleric and militant
- Abdul Aziz Baba, Malaysian medical doctor, hematologist, and academic administrator
- Abdulaziz Al-Babtain (1936–2023), Kuwaiti poet, businessman, and philanthropist
- Abdul Aziz Abdul Rahman Abdul Aziz Al Baddah (born 1982), Saudi Guantanamo detainee
- Abdul Aziz al-Badri (1929–1969), Iraqi Islamic scholar
- Abdul Aziz Abu Bakar (born 1945), Brunei royalty and politician
- Abdul Aziz Bari (born 1959), Malaysian politician, academic, professor, and lecturer
- Abdulaziz Belraysh (born 1990), Libyan footballer
- Abdulaziz Al-Bishi (born 1994), Saudi footballer
- Abdulaziz Hassan Bujaloof (born 1973), Qatari footballer
- Abdulaziz Al-Buloushi (born 1962), Kuwaiti footballer
- Abdulaziz Damdam (born 1995), Saudi footballer
- Abdulaziz Dhafir (born 2001), Saudi footballer
- Abdul Aziz Doctor (born 1996), Indian politician
- Abdul Aziz Khan Dreshak, Pakistani politician
- Abdul Aziz Durrani (1905–1979), Afghan-born Indian cricket coach and player
- Abdul Aziz Sheikh Fadzir (born 1963), Malaysian politician and businessman
- Abdulaziz al-Fagham (1971–2019), Saudi body guard
- Abdul Aziz bin Fahd (born 1973), Saudi prince and politician
- Abdulaziz bin Turki Al-Faisal (born 1983), Saudi racing driver and businessman
- Abdulaziz Fallatah (born 1985), Saudi footballer
- Abdulaziz Farah, Kenyan politician
- Abdul Aziz Fatahiya (born 1982), Ghanaian politician
- Abdul Aziz Abdul Ghani (1939–2011), Prime Minister of Yemen
- Abdul Aziz Bin Khalid al-Ghanim (1903–1998), Qatari diplomat
- Abdul Aziz Ghazi (born 1960), Pakistani cleric
- Abdulaziz Al-Gheilani (born 1995), Omani footballer
- Abdul Aziz Al Ghurair (born 1954), Emirati businessman
- Abdulaziz Al-Gumaei (born 1990), Yemeni footballer
- Abdulaziz Al-Haddad (1950–2025), Kuwaiti actor and director
- Abdulaziz Haikal (born 1990), Emirati footballer
- Abdul Aziz al-Hakim (1950–2009), Iraqi theologian and politician
- Abdul Aziz Hamdan (born 1985/86), Bruneian youth advocate, community worker, and politician
- Abdulaziz Hamsal (born 1987), Saudi footballer
- Abdulaziz Haqqani, Afghan Taliban leader
- Abdulaziz Al-Harabi (born 1997), Saudi footballer
- Abdul Aziz al-Harbi (born 1965), Saudi Islamic scholar
- Abdulaziz Hatem (born 1990), Qatari footballer
- Abdul Aziz Hotak (died 1717), ruler of the Ghilzai Hotaki dynasty of Kandahar
- Abdul Aziz bin Husain (born 1950), Malaysian politician
- Abdulaziz Abdul Ghani Ibrahim (1939–2022), Sudanese researcher and university professor
- Abdul Aziz Ismail (born 1981), Malaysian footballer
- Abdul Aziz Jaafar (born 1956), Malaysian admiral
- Abdulaziz Al-Jamaan (born 1996), Saudi footballer
- Abdulaziz Al-Janoubi (born 1974), Saudi footballer
- Abdulaziz Jassim (1957–2018), Qatari actor and comedian
- Abdulaziz Al-Jebreen (born 1990), Saudi footballer
- Abdul Aziz Juned (born 1941), Bruneian aristocrat, poet, and politician
- Abdul Aziz Junejo (1961–2024), Pakistani politician
- Abdulaziz Al-Kaabi (born 1998), Emirati footballer
- Abdul Aziz Abdul Kadir (born 1963), Malaysian politician
- Abdul Aziz Khan Kaka (1906–1987), Pakistani politician
- Abdulaziz Al-Kalthem (born 1987), Saudi footballer
- Abdulaziz Kamilov (born 1947), Uzbek politician
- Abdulaziz Jassim Kanoo (1931–2016), Bahraini businessman
- Abdul Aziz Karim, Singaporean politician
- Abdulaziz Karim (born 1979), Qatari footballer
- Abdulaziz Karimov (1944–2020), Uzbek researcher and inventor
- Abdul Aziz Kashmiri (1919–2010), Indian journalist
- Abdul Aziz Keita (born 1990), Guinean footballer
- Abdul-Aziz al-Khair (born 1952), Syrian intellectual
- Abdul Aziz Sa'ad Al-Khaldi (born 1979), Saudi Guantanamo prisoner
- Abdulaziz Khalid (born 1997), Bahraini footballer
- Abdul Aziz Khan (cricketer), Indian first-class cricketer
- Abdul Aziz Khandaker (1923–1991), Bangladeshi politician
- Abdulaziz Khathran (born 1973), Saudi footballer
- Abdulaziz Khayri (born 1997), Qatari handball player
- Abdulaziz bin Mohieddin Khoja (born 1940), Saudi diplomat
- Abdulaziz Komilov (born 1947), Uzbek politician
- Abdul Aziz El Koussy (1906–1992), Egyptian psychologist
- Abdul Aziz Kurd (1904–1979), Pakistani Baloch politician
- Abdulaziz Al-Kuwari (born 1979), Qatari rally driver
- Abdul Aziz bin Laboun, Saudi geologist, traveler, and historian
- Abdulaziz Ladan (born 1991), Saudi middle-distance runner
- Abdulaziz Laval (born 1992), Nigerian footballer
- Abdulaziz Al-Mahmoud, Qatari engineer, journalist, and author
- Abdul Aziz Abdul Majid (1907–1975), Yang di-Pertua Negeri of Malacca
- Abdulaziz Majrashi (footballer, born 1991) (born 1991), Saudi footballer
- Abdulaziz Majrashi (footballer, born 1996) (born 1996), Saudi footballer
- Abdulaziz Makame (born 1996), Tanzanian footballer
- Abdulaziz Makin (born 2001), Saudi footballer
- Abdul Aziz Malazada (1917–1987), Iranian Islamic scholar
- Abdulaziz Al-Mandeel (born 1989), Kuwaiti athlete
- Abdulaziz Al-Mansor (born 1990), Saudi footballer
- Abdulaziz al-Maqaleh (1937–2022), Yemeni poet and writer
- Abdul Aziz Al-Marzoug (born 1975), Saudi footballer
- Abdulaziz F. Al-Masaeed (1915–2001), Kuwaiti journalist, businessman, and politician
- Abdulaziz Masnoum (born 2006), Yemeni footballer
- Abdul Aziz Al Matrafi (born 1964), Saudi Guantanamo prisoner
- Abdul Aziz Mia (born 1951/52), Bangladeshi politician
- Abdul Aziz ibn Ayyaf Al-Miqrin (born 1958), Saudi politician
- Abdul Aziz Mirza (born 1943), Pakistani naval officer and diplomat
- Abdulaziz bin Mitab (1870–1906), ruler of Arabia
- Abdulaziz Mohamed (born 1965), Emirati footballer
- Abdulaziz Al-Mohammed (born 1987), Saudi footballer
- Abdul Aziz Moshood (born 1968), Nigerian footballer
- Abdulaziz Al Muammar (1919–1984), Saudi technocrat
- Abdulaziz Al-Mufarrej (born 1986), Saudi footballer
- Abdul Aziz Munshi (1885–1949), Bangladeshi politician
- Abdul Aziz Al-Muqbali (born 1989), Omani footballer
- Abdulaziz bin Mohammed bin Ayyaf Al Muqrin (born 1958), Saudi architect, philanthropist, and politician
- Abdul-Aziz Ayaba Musah (born 1986), Ghanaian politician
- Abdul Aziz bin Musaid (died 1977), Saudi soldier
- Abdulaziz Al-Mutair (born 1992), Saudi footballer
- Abdul-Aziz ibn Myatt (born 1950), British Islamist and former neo-Nazi
- Abdulaziz Nasari (born 1998), Iranian footballer
- Abdulaziz Al-Nashi (born 1986), Saudi footballer
- Abdulaziz Noor (born 1999), Saudi footballer
- Abdulaziz bin Humaid Al Nuaimi (died 1910), Ruler of Ajman
- Abdul-Aziz Nurudeen (born 1998), Ghanaian footballer
- Abdul-Aziz Nyako (born 1970), Nigerian senator
- Abdul Aziz Al-Obaidly (born 2001), Qatari swimmer
- Abdulaziz Oboshqra (born 1981), Saudi footballer
- Abdulaziz al-Omari (1979–2001), Saudi aircraft hijacker in the September 11 attacks
- Abdulaziz Al-Onaizan (born 1966), Saudi businessman
- Abdulaziz Muhammad Saleh bin Otash (born 1975), Saudi alleged terrorist
- Abdulaziz Al-Othman (born 2004), Saudi footballer
- Abdul Aziz Pasha (died 2001), Bangladesh army officer
- Abdul Aziz Qansouh (born 1969), Egyptian academic and politician
- Abdulaziz Al-Qosair (born 1994), Saudi footballer
- Abdul Azizi Ali Rahman (born 1987), Bruneian footballer
- Abdulaziz bin Mutaib Al Rashid (1870–1906), Emir of Jabal Shammar
- Abdulaziz bin Saud Al Rashid (1915–??), Saudi royal
- Abdulaziz bin Abdullah Al-Rubaie (1929–2021), Saudi journalist and writer
- Abdulaziz Sachedina (1942–2025), Tanzanian-American professor of religious studies
- Abdul Aziz Said (1930–2021), Syrian-America political writer
- Abdulaziz Al Salimi (born 1991), Kuwaiti footballer
- Abdulaziz Al-Saqqaf (1952–1999), Yemeni human-rights activist, economist, and journalist
- Abdulaziz Al-Saran (born 1984), Saudi footballer
- Abdul Aziz Sarkar, Bangladeshi police officer
- Abdulaziz bin Abdullah Al Saud (born 1962), Saudi royal
- Abdulaziz bin Ahmed Al Saud (born 1963), Saudi prince and businessman
- Abdulaziz bin Bandar Al Saud (born 1961), Saudi royal
- Abdulaziz bin Fahd Al Saud, Saudi prince
- Abdulaziz bin Majid Al Saud (born 1960), Saudi politician
- Abdulaziz bin Muhammad Al Saud (1720–1803), ruler of Saudi Arabia
- Abdulaziz bin Musaed bin Jiluwi Al Saud (1885–1977), Saudi military commander and royal
- Abdulaziz bin Salman Al Saud (born 1960), Saudi royal
- Abdulaziz bin Saud Al Saud (born 1983), Saudi royal
- Abdulaziz bin Talal Al Saud (born 1982), Saudi prince
- Abdulaziz bin Turki Al Saud (born 1986) (born 1986), Saudi prince, businessman, entrepreneur, and investor
- Abdulaziz Al-Shahrani (1994–2026), Saudi footballer
- Abdulaziz al-Shalal, Syrian military police chief
- Abdulaziz Nasser Al Shamsi (born 1956), Emirati diplomat
- Abdul Aziz Shamsuddin (1938–2020), Malaysian politician
- Abdulaziz Shareef (born 1993), Qatari footballer
- Abdulaziz Al-Sharid (born 1994), Saudi footballer
- Abdulaziz Al-Shatti (born 1990), Kuwaiti fencer
- Abdulaziz Al-Shayji (born 1967), Kuwaiti politician
- Abdulaziz Al Sheikh (1943–2025), Saudi Islamic scholar
- Abdul-Aziz Shennib (1936–2003), Libyan diplomat
- Abdulaziz al-Shubaily, Saudi human rights advocate
- Abdulaziz Solmaz (born 1988), Turkish footballer
- Abdul Aziz Abdullah Ali Al Suadi (born 1974), Yemeni Guantanamo prisoner
- Abdulaziz Al Sulaiti (born 1988), Qatari footballer
- Abdul Aziz Taha (born 1936), Malaysian banker
- Abdulaziz Takrouni (born 1991), Saudi footballer
- Abdul Aziz Talib, Malaysian politician
- Abdul Aziz Tamit (born 1989), Bruneian footballer
- Abdul Aziz Mohd Tamit (born 1966), Bruneian military officer and politician
- Abdul Aziz Tetteh (born 1990), Ghanaian footballer
- Abdulaziz bin Faisal bin Mohammed Al-Thani, Qatari politician
- Abdul Aziz bin Nasser al-Thani, Qatari businessman
- Abdulaziz al-Tuwaijri (1912–2007), Saudi soldier and politician
- Abdul Aziz Umar (born 1936), Brunei politician
- Abdul Aziz al-Uqaili (1919–1981), Iraqi military officer and politician
- Abdulaziz Usman (born 1962), Nigerian politician
- Abdul Aziz Wahabzadah (born 1973/74), Afghan-born New Zealand National hero
- Abdul Aziz Wains (born 1932), Pakistani sports shooter
- Abdulaziz Waseli (born 1996), Saudi footballer
- Abdulaziz Al-Yahri (born 1990), Qatari footballer
- Abdul-Aziz Yakubu (born 1998), Ghanaian footballer
- Abdul Aziz Yamulki (1890–1981), Iraqi army officer
- Abdulaziz Musa Yar'Adua (born 1964), Nigerian politician and military officer
- Abdul Aziz Yassin (1932–2022), Malaysian politician
- Abdulaziz Al-Yousef (born 1988), Saudi footballer
- Abdul Aziz Yusif (born 1991), Ghanaian footballer
- Abdul Aziz Zain (1922–2012), Malaysian barrister, judge, and businessman
- Abdul Aziz Zainal (born 1951), Malaysian diplomat
- Abdulaziz bin Abdullah Al Zamil (1942–2019), Saudi politician
- Abdul Aziz Zargar (1925–2013), Indian politician

== Surname ==
=== Abd al-Aziz ===
- Abu Faris Abd al-Aziz II (1361–1434), Hafsid Caliph of Ifriqiya
- Samir Abd al-Aziz (born 1937), Iraqi politician
- Umm al-Banin bint Abd al-Aziz, wife of Umayyad caliph al-Walid
- Yahya ibn Abd al-Aziz (died 1152), ruler of the Hammadids

=== Abdel Aziz ===
- Abdullah Muhammed Abdel Aziz (born 1967), Saudi Guantanamo prisoner
- Ayman Abdelaziz (born 1978), Egyptian-Turkish footballer
- Hany Abdel-Aziz (born 1946), Egyptian diplomat
- Karim Abdel Aziz (born 1975), Egyptian actor
- Lobna Abdel Aziz (born 1935), Egyptian actress
- Maged A. Abdelaziz (born 1954), Egyptian diplomat
- Mohamed Abdelaziz (Sahrawi politician) (1947–2016), Sahrawi politician
- Mohamed Ould Abdel Aziz (born 1956), Mauritanian politician
- Omar Abdel Aziz (born 1983), Egyptian squash player

=== Abdul Aziz ===
- Adel Abdulaziz (born 1980), Emirati footballer
- Amirsham Abdul Aziz (born 1950), Malaysian businessman
- Azmin Azram Abdul Aziz (born 1976), Malaysian footballer
- Farouk Abdul-Aziz (born 1946), Egyptian television presenter and writer
- Mehmed Abdulaziz (1901–1977), head of the Ottoman dynasty
- Mohamed Nazri Abdul Aziz (born 1954), Malaysian politician
- Mohammed Abdul Aziz, Ghanaian politician
- Mohammed Abdi Abdulaziz (born 1958), Tanzanian politician
- Muhammad Abdul Aziz (born 1938), American man falesly convicted for the assassination of Malcolm X
- Muqrin bin Abdulaziz (born 1945), Saudi prince and politician
- Omar Abdul Aziz (born 1985), Nigerian footballer
- P. K. Abdul Aziz (born 1947), Indian scientist and academic administrator
- Shah Abdul Aziz (1745–1823), Indian Islamic scholar
- Sheikh Abdul Aziz (1952–2008), Kashmiri politician
- Subhizade Abdulaziz (died 1782/83), Ottoman physician
- Ungku Abdul Aziz (1922–2020), British-Malay academic administrator
- Yasmin Abdulaziz (born 1980), Egyptian actress
- Zaid Abdul-Aziz (born 1946), American basketball player

== See also ==
- Abdul Aziz (disambiguation)
