= Abdul Aziz =

Abd al-Aziz is a male Arabic theophoric name, commonly abbreviated as Aziz.

Abdul Aziz, Abdulaziz or Abdul-Aziz may refer to:

== Places ==
- King Abdulaziz University, Jeddah, Saudi Arabia
- King Abdulaziz International Airport, Jeddah, Saudi Arabia
- King Abdulaziz City for Science and Technology, Riyadh, Saudi Arabia
- King Abdulaziz Naval Base, Saudi Arabia
- King Abdulaziz Sports City, Mecca, Saudi Arabia
- King Abdulaziz Historical Center, Riyadh, Saudi Arabia
- King Abdul Aziz Mosque, Marbella, Spain
- Prince Abdulaziz bin Musa'ed Sports City, Ha'il, Saudi Arabia
- Prince Abdulaziz Bin Mousaed Economic City, proposed city in Saudi Arabia
- Abdelaziz Chtioui Stadium, football stadium in Tunisia
- Sultan Abdul Aziz Shah Airport, Subang, Malaysia
- Sultan Abdul Aziz Shah Airport Highway, Selangor, Malaysia
- Sultan Salahuddin Abdul Aziz Mosque, Selangor, Malaysia
- Sultan Abdul Aziz Shah Jamek Mosque, Selangor, Malaysia
- Tun Abdul Aziz Mosque, Selangor, Malaysia
- Abdul-Aziz al-Samarrai Mosque, Fallujah, Iraq
- Sultan Salahuddin Abdul Aziz Power Station, Selangor, Malaysia
- Sultan Salahuddin Abdul Aziz Shah Building, Selangor, Malaysia
- Sultan Salahuddin Abdul Aziz Shah Bridge, Selangor, Malaysia
- Sultan Abdul Aziz Shah Golf and Country Club, golf club in Selangor, Malaysia
- Fereej Abdel Aziz, settlement in Qatar
- Sidi Abdelaziz, town in Algeria

== Roads ==
- Jalan Raja Muda Abdul Aziz, road in Kuala Lumpur, Malaysia
- Persiaran Sultan Salahuddin Abdul Aziz Shah, Putrajaya, road in Malaysia

== Other uses ==
- Abd al-Aziz, a male Arabic theophoric name, commonly abbreviated as Aziz
- Prince Abdulaziz (yacht), Saudi yacht
- Order of King Abdulaziz, Saudi Order of Merit
