= Owolabi =

- Language: Yoruba

Origin
- Meaning: we've birthed wealth
- Region of origin: West Africa

Owolabi is a Yoruba given name and surname meaning "we've birthed wealth". Notable people with this name include:

Given name

- Israel Mobolaji Temitayo Odunayo Oluwafemi Owolabi Adesanya, Nigerian-born New Zealand professional mixed martial artist
- Raheem Owolabi Isiaka, Nigerian footballer

Surname

- Abdulazeez Owolabi, Nigerian footballer
- Bola Owolabi, British medical doctor
- Felix Owolabi, Nigerian footballer
- Ganiyu Owolabi, Nigerian footballer
- Israel Esan Owolabi, Nigerian engineer and academic
- Kubrat Owolabi, Nigerian table tennis player
- Tunde Owolabi, Belgian footballer
