= Abdulaziz Jassim Kanoo =

Bahraini businessman (1931–2016)

- Born: 1931 – August 31
- Died: 2016

Abdulaziz Jassim Kanoo (Arabic: عبد العزيز جاسم كانو, 1931 – August 31, 2016, Mahooz) is a Bahraini businessman. A descendant of the Kanoo family, he attended primary and secondary school in Somerset, England, before enrolling in American University of Beirut. He received a business degree in Scotland.

== Career ==
He held the following positions:

- Yusuf Bin Ahmed Kanoo Company, Vice-Chairman and Deputy CEO
- Al Jazeera Tourism Company, Chairman of the Board
- Saudi Corporation for Industry and Commerce, Chairman of the Board
- Saudi Loading Company, Chairman of the Board
- Saudi Arabian Lube Additives Company Limited, Chairman of the Board
- Novotel Bahrain Al Dana Resort, Chairman of the Board
- Investcorp, Vice-Chairman of the Board
- Taaleem Educational Services, Vice-Chairman of the Board
- Saudi Arabian General Investment Authority, Director for the Eastern Province
- United Arab Shipping Company, Member of the Board of Directors
- Saudi Public Transport Company (SAPTCO), Member of the Board of Directors
- Gulf Union Insurance & Reinsurance Company, Member of the Board of Directors
- Bahrain Public Transport Company, Member of the Board of Directors
- Dammam Central Hospital, Member of the Board of Directors
- Al Madinah Region Development Authority, Member of the Board of Directors
- Saudi Society of Family and Community Medicine, Member of the Board of Directors
- Saudi Diabetes and Endocrine Association, Member of the Board of Directors
- Public Bank Berhad, Member of the Board of Directors
- Human Rights Commission (Saudi Arabia), Eastern Province, Member of the Board of Directors

== Personal life ==
He married his cousin, Sarah Ali Kanoo, and had four children with her: Ali, Saud, Nawf, and Badr. On January 8, 2018, his widow died and was buried in Manama Cemetery.

His brother is Abdul Latif Jassim Kanoo, founder of the Beit Al Quran, a world-renowned museum of the Quran.

== Honors ==
In 2007, Hamad bin Isa Al Khalifa, the King of Bahrain, awarded him the King Hamad Order of the Renaissance, the nation's highest civilian honor. In 1994, he was called the first businessman in the Kingdom of Saudi Arabia.

== Death ==
Kanoo died on August 31, 2016, at the age of 85 at his home in Mahooz, Capital Governorate. He was buried in Manama Cemetery.
