= Al-Samarrai =

Al-Samarrai is an Arabic surname common in Iraq. Those with the last name are likely from the city of Samarra, Iraq. Notable people with the surname include:

- Ahmad Husayn Khudayir as-Samarrai, Iraqi politician
- Ayad al-Samarrai, Iraqi politician
- Ayham al-Samarrai, Iraqi politician
- Abd al-Khaliq al-Samarra'i, Iraqi politician
- Ibrahim Awad Ibrahim Ali al-Badri al-Samarrai, Islamist militant
- Sarmed al-Samarrai, Iraqi actor
- Wafiq al-Samarrai, Iraqi general

== See also ==
- Abdul-Aziz al-Samarrai
