= Habiba Sebti =

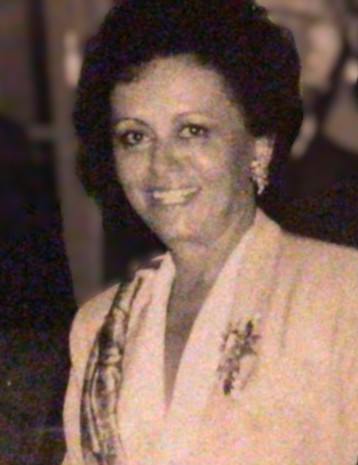
- Born: 31 May 1936
- Died: 1 August 2019 (aged 83)
- Occupations: Engineer, polytechnician

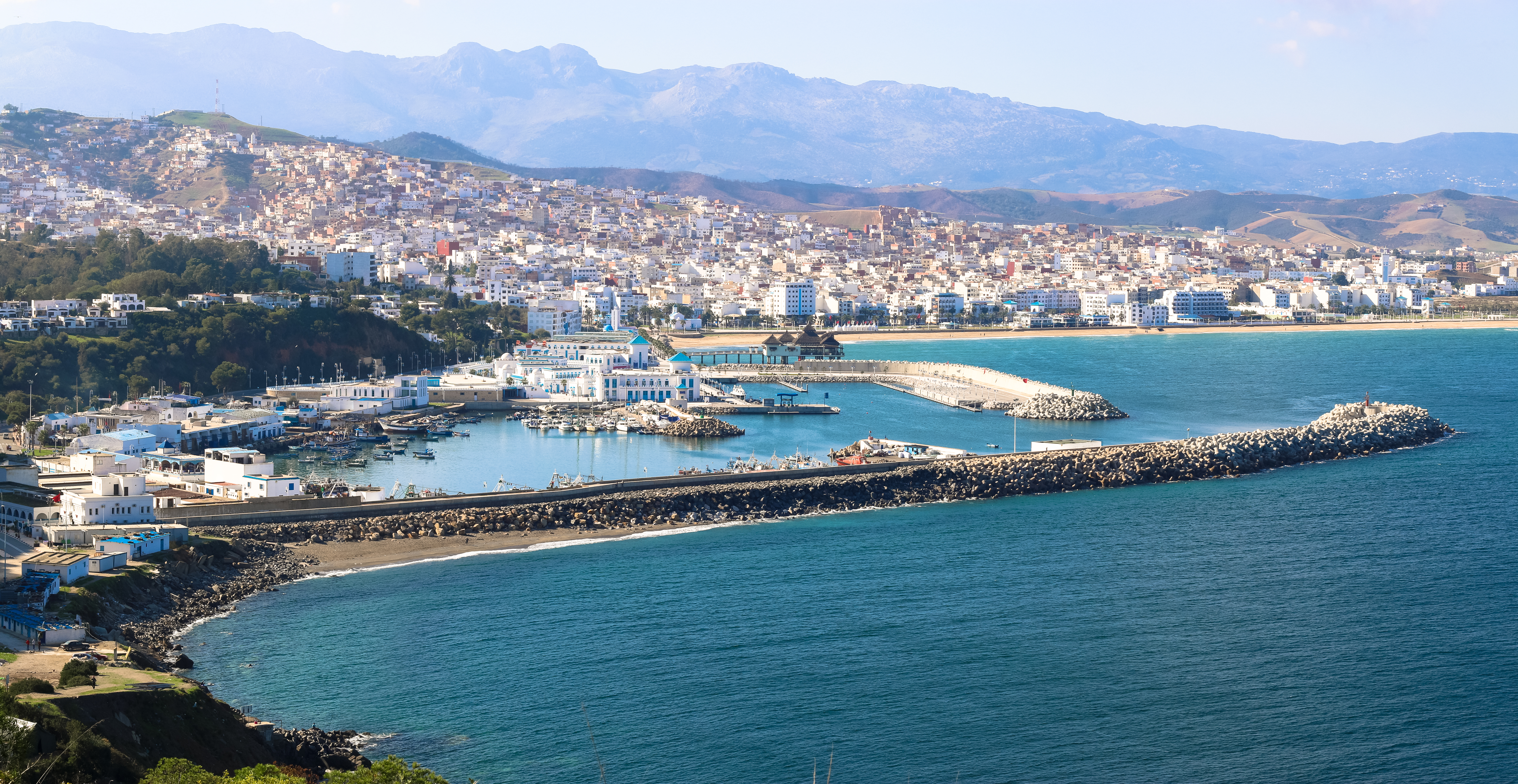
M'diq Port, Morocco (2015)

Habiba Sebti (31 May 1936 – 1 August 2019), also known by her married name Habiba Benjelloun, was a Moroccan engineer, the first Moroccan woman to graduate from the École Polytechnique Féminine.

== Biography ==
=== Education ===
Habiba Sebti completed her secondary education at Lycée Lyautey in Casablanca (Morocco), where she obtained her baccalauréat in 1956. She continued her studies in France and entered the École Polytechnique Féminine (EPF) — the first major engineering school dedicated to women, founded by Marie-Louise Paris in 1925— becoming the first Moroccan woman engineer to graduate from this institution.

=== Professional Career ===
Married in 1959 to Abdelaziz Benjelloun, an engineer graduated from École nationale des ponts et chaussées in Paris, and a prominent Moroccan political figure, with whom she frequently collaborated, Habiba Sebti remained discreet in public life. Nevertheless, she played a significant technical role in major infrastructure projects in Morocco. Among these were the Port of M’diq in the 1960s, and the Embalse 9 de Abril de 1947 in the Tangier region, Northern Morocco.
