= Abdulmalik Atta =

Nigerian diplomat and politician

Abdulmalik Ibrahim Atta
- Atta in 1963
- Born: 1914
- Died: 1969 (aged 54–55); Okene
- Spouse: Amina Abdulsalam 1933–1969
- Father: Ibrahim Atta

Alhaji Abdulmalik Ibrahim Atta CBE (1914–1969) was a Nigerian diplomat and politician who was Nigeria's first High Commissioner to the United Kingdom. Atta was a strong supporter of Tijaniya sufi order in Nigeria, he was a close friend of Sheikh Ibrahim Niass, and his daughter Sayyada Bilqis was married to Sheikh Niass from 1954 until his death in 1975. Atta was married to several wives including Amina Abdulsalam. He had several children including Zainab, Mashood, Bilqis.

== Early life ==
Maliki was born in 1914. His father was a traditional ruler of Igbirra people, Ibrahim Onoruoiza Atta of Igbirra kingdom in what is now Kogi State. His brother was Abdul Aziz Attah.

== Education ==
Maliki began his education at Okene Elementary School in 1923, before proceeding to Bida Primary School in 1927 and later to Teachers Training College Katsina in 1929. In 1950, he went to England for a local government training program.

== Career ==
Maliki started his career as a teacher in Okene Middle School in 1935. Later in 1936 he was appointed as supervisor for works in Okene, a position he held until 1939. He became the provincial clerk in Katsina from 1939 to 1940, and later assumed the position of the president of the Igbirra/Okene City Council before he traveled to England in 1950. After his return from England, he joined the Northern People's Congress (NPC) and in 1952 he served as a member of the Northern Regional House of Assembly, and also the Northern Regional Federal House of Representatives, a position he held until 1958. In 1960 he was appointed the first High Commissioner to the United Kingdom before he was transferred to Paris as the Nigerian Ambassador to France.

== Later life and death ==
Maliki died in 1969 while on leave in Okene, Kogi State.

== Honours ==
He was awarded the Commander of the Order of the British Empire (CBE) in 1960. Two portraits of Maliki by Rex Coleman for Baron Studios are held in the permanent collection of the National Portrait Gallery, London.
