= Abdulaziz Al-Shayji =

Kuwaiti politician (born 1967)

Abdulaziz Al-Shayji was a member of the Kuwaiti National Assembly, representing the third district.

== Biography ==
Born in 1967, Al-Shayji studied architectural engineering at University of Miami.

In 2005, he ran for the municipal elections of the fourth district.

In 2008, Abdulaziz Al-Shayji was elected to the National Assembly. While political parties are technically illegal in Kuwait, Al-Shayji affiliates with the Islamist Hadas party.

On November 3, 2008, Al-Shayji spoke in support of a women's rights bill. Speaking to Al-Watan Daily about the bill, Al-Shayji said: "This law grants women their social security rights, employment, education, health and housing rights. The parliamentary Committee for Women's Affairs has already included different suggestions presented by concerned MPs in this law, which also include providing equal chances for women to take leading positions, equal pay with men, giving full rights to widows and females married to nonـKuwaitis, in addition to special leaves."[2].

On November 21, 2008, Shayji criticized calls for unconstitutional dissolution of Parliament, saying that such a move would avail thieves to plunder public funds: "Despite all the drawbacks within the National Assembly, the Parliament plays a crucial role in serving the country and the people."
