= Abdul Aziz bin Nasser al-Thani =

- Occupation: Business

Sheikh Abdul Aziz bin Nasser al-Thani (Arabic: عبد العزيز بن ناصر آل ثاني) is a Qatari businessman and member of the ruling al-Thani family.

== Career ==
Al-Thani serves as deputy chairman of the Business Trading Company (BTC), a development and investment company that prides itself on close connections to the Qatari state. Established in 1997 in Doha, the multimillion-dollar firm deals primarily with the development of shopping malls and leisure-centers, such as Landmark Mall and Villaggio Mall. BTC’s chairman is Abdulaziz bin Mohammed al-Rabban.

== BTC ==
Abdulaziz bin Mohammed Al Rabban is the chairman and Al-Thani serves as deputy chairman of the Business Trading Company (BTC), investment company that is mainly composed of project developers, focusing in real estate development. BTC was founded in Qatar in 1997 to offer retail complexes. The Landmark Shopping Mall, built in 2000, and the Villaggio Shopping Mall, built in 2006 are the company's two most prominent retail complexes that have affected Qatar's development. These two complexes partnered with the Qatari Ministry of Interior using its personal Qatari identification card with the Department of Citizenship and travel documents in its complexes, as well as the opening of the department's branches in the malls. BTC boasts itself on its connections in the State of Qatar and in the Gulf region.
