= Abdulaziz bin Mohammed Al Ateeqi =

Eductionalist

- Born: 1882; Harmah, Riyadh Province, Saudi Arabia
- Died: 1969 (aged 87); Kuwait
- Occupation(s): academic, historian, politician

Abdulaziz bin Mohammed Al Ateeqi (Arabic: عبد العزيز العتيقي, 1882 –1969), was a Saudi educator, historian, and politician. Considered one of the pioneers of modern education in the Persian Gulf region, he was the first Saudi media official as an employee of the Directorate of Publications in 1926. He opened a modern Western-style school at his home in Al Majma'ah in 1930-31 and advised King Faisal when the latter was a deputy of his father in Mecca. Al Ateeqi served on the Consultative Assembly of Saudi Arabia (Shura Council) and presided over it on behalf of King Faisal before the latter's accession. Starting in 1916, he spent extensive time on stays in Bahrain and Kuwait, where he introduced modern pedagogy to the schools while preaching reform in India and Indonesia. He died in Kuwait on 28 March 1969.
