= Abdelaziz Ziari =

Algerian politician (born 1945)

- عبد العزيز زياري
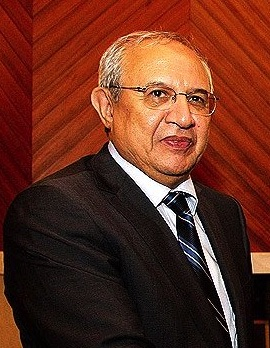
- Ziari in 2010

President of the People's National Assembly
- In office May 31, 2007 – May 26, 2012
- Preceded by: Amar Saadani
- Succeeded by: Mohamed Larbi Ould Khalifa

Minister of Health of Algeria
- In office September 4, 2012 – September 11, 2013
- Preceded by: Djamel Ould Abbes
- Succeeded by: Abdelmalek Boudiaf

Personal details
- Born: August 28, 1945 (age 81) Constantine, French Algeria (now Algeria)
- Party: FLN
- Occupation: Doctor

Abdelaziz Ziari is an Algerian politician and doctor who served as the President of the People's National Assembly from 2007 to 2012.

== Biography ==
Ziari was born in Constantine on August 28, 1945. He studied medicine and obtained his doctorate in medicine in 1969. From 1962 to 1967, Ziari was an activist in a local union, but left it in 1967 to join the FLN. In 1977, he ran in legislative elections for the first time in the constituency of central Algiers. In 1978, he began teaching at the University of Algiers and in 1980, he became head of the university's hospital.

In 1983, Ziari was elected deputy for the constituency of El Harrouch, Skikda Province. From 1983 to 1987, he chaired the education, culture, and social affairs commission of the National People's Assembly (APN). He was re-elected in 1987. In October 1991, Ziari was appointed Minister of Labor, a position he held until 1992. From 2003 to 2004, he served as Advisor to the President. From 2004 to 2005, he served as Minister of Youth and Sports. In the late 1990s and early 2000s, Ziari was the head of presidential relations with parliament. Ziari as

Ziari was elected as President of the National Assembly on May 31, 2007. During his time as APN President, he met with European Union president Hans-Gert Pöttering in October 2007, and in January 2008 said that he wanted to strengthen Algerian democratic promotion with the Council of Europe. In 2010, he met with the Russian Prime Minister Dmitry Medvedev. In 2012, Ziari defended President Abdelaziz Bouteflika's decision to entrust the upcoming Algerian elections to the next assembly.

Ziari was voted out of APN president in September 2012, and appointed Minister of Health. As Minister of Health, Ziari called for Algeria to become a biomedical superpower in Africa. In an interview, he said that he wanted to combine Algerian medical research with the growing manufacturing in the country. He was dismissed as minister in September 2013.

In 2025, Ziari said that he "would never set foot in France" using his diplomatic passport due to the growing influence of the French far-right denigrating Algerian sovereignty.

== Videography ==
- Abdelaziz Ziari Ancien president de l'assemblee populaire nationale et ex-ministre - Radio Algerie video interview, December 22, 2019
