= Mohammed Abdulaziz =

Tanzanian politician

Member of the Tanzanian Parliament
- In office 2000–2010
- Constituency: Lindi town

Personal details
- Born: 17 June 1958 (age 67)
- Party: CCM

Mohammed Abdi Abdulaziz (born 17 June 1958) is a Tanzanian politician who served as a member of the Tanzanian Parliament for Lindi town constituency. He is a member of, and currently the District Secretary for, the ruling Chama Cha Mapinduzi party. In 1989 he received a Certificate in Law from the University of Dar es Salaam.
