= Abdul Aziz bin Laboun =

Saudi geologist, traveler, and historian

Abdul Aziz bin Abdullah bin Laaboun
- Education: PhD in Petroleum Geology King Saud University
- Website: https://ibnlaboun.wordpress.com/

Abdul Aziz bin Abdullah bin Laboun (Arabic: عبدالعزيز بن لعبون) is a Saudi geologist, traveler, and historian specializing in petroleum geology. His interest in geology and oil history in Saudi Arabia extended to other fields including history and popular literature. He has published many books, including the Journey of Oil Exploration and Industry in the Kingdom of Saudi Arabia and the book, Najdi Historians and Their Effects.

== Education ==
He holds a professor in the field of geological and oil studies at King Saud University in 2012. He holds a PhD in Petroleum Geology from King Abdulaziz University in 1982. He holds a master's degree in geology from the University of Tulsa, Oklahoma, USA, in 1977. He holds a university degree in geology, chemistry from the University of Riyadh (now King Saud University) in 1973.

== Works ==
He worked in the Air Survey Department at the Ministry of Petroleum and Mineral Resources from 1967 to 1969. Later, he worked at the Arabian Oil Company Ltd. in Khafji from 1973 to 1980. He also served at Saudi Aramco from 1980 to 1999 and worked as a professor of geology at King Saud University.
