= Abdulaziz bin Khalifa al-Attiyah =

Qatari politician

Abdulaziz bin Khalifa al-Attiyah (Arabic: العطية خليفة بن لعزيز ا عبد), is the cousin of Qatar's foreign minister, former head of the Qatar Billiard and Snooker Federation, and former member of the Qatar Olympic Committee who has been tied to illicit terrorist financing activities, specifically for al-Qaeda, it's al-Nusra Front, and the Mahdid Ahl al-Sham campaign.

Al-Attiyah was reported by Lebanese and American authorities of being a financier for al-Qaeda and its Syrian affiliate, the al-Nusra Front. In May 2012, Lebanese officials were tipped off by the United States that al-Attaiyah was using their country as a base to funnel money to the al-Nusrah Front. According to Lebanese media, he gave $20,000 to Umar al-Qatari also known as the 'Wolf of al-Qaeda' and Shadi al-Mawlawi, both al-Qaeda operatives and U.S. designated terrorists.

He was consequently arrested in Lebanon, but due to intensive lobbying efforts by Qatari authorities, he was released on May 23, shortly after his arrest. Some of these efforts included Qatar reportedly threatening to deport over 30,000 Lebanese expats residing in Qatar if their demands of al-Attiyah's release were not met. Although he was charged and sentenced in his trial in absentia in June 2014 to seven years in prison by the Lebanese military for "belonging to an armed terrorist organization and conspiring against state institutions with the purpose of altering the structure of the Lebanese state," and for "financing terrorist groups and the introduction of weapons to Syria delivered through rebels", he currently resides in Qatar where continues to show support for dangerous terrorist groups.

Al-Attiyah also worked on the Mahdid Ahl al-Sham Campaign online fundraising campaign in August 2013, where he co-presented a fundraising video that asked for donors for support to arm Jihadists in Syria. This defunct campaign, posed as a charity organization, has been known to fund violent extremists. It was shut down in 2014, and has been described by the U.S. Department of State as suspicious of sending support to extremist elements in Syria. Additionally, it has been identified as a source of financing for the Al-Nusra Front, the Syrian branch of Al-Qaeda, listed by the United States as a terrorist group.

Additionally, he continues to display his support for terrorists and terror activities on his Twitter page, frequently voicing admiration for Osama bin Laden, al-Nusrah Front, and ISIS. In a tweet posted on November 9, 2014, he stated his wish for Bin Laden to still be alive, and hopes that he is resting in paradise.

His ties to the royal family have caused controversy for Qatar and their inadvertent support for terrorists and the financing of terrorists. Al-Attiyah is first cousins with Abdullah bin Hamad al-Attiyah, Qatar's head of "administrative control and transparency agency", responsible for enforcement against money laundering and terrorist funding. Despite the blatant ties and Qatar's disregard of his cousin to terrorist financing, Qatar's foreign minister insisted that Qatar does not condone radical terrorists or terrorist groups. The al-Attiyah family stems from the same lineage as Qatar's ruling family, the al-Thani's and the Banu Tamim's, who are considered the second most prominent tribal clan in Qatar.
