= Abdulazeez Idris =

Nigerian politician

Abdulazeez Idris (born June 1970) is a Nigerian politician from Kogi State. He represented the Okene/Ogori/Magongo Federal Constituency in the National Assembly, serving as a member of the Peoples Democratic Party (PDP) from 2003 to 2007.
