= Abdelaziz Sfar =

Tunisian handball player

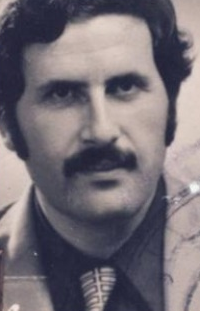

Personal information
- Native name: عبد العزيز صفر
- Nationality: Tunisian
- Born: November 7, 1939; Bizert
- Died: April 29, 2012; Tunis

Sport
- Sport: Handball

Abdelaziz Sfar (Arabic: عبد العزيز صفر) (November 7, 1939, in Bizert – April 29, 2012, in Tunis) was a Tunisian handball player, teacher and leader.

== Life ==
He studied in INSEP, Expertise and Performance in Vincennes (1962–1966). He obtained a CAPEPS in Normal School of Physical Education in Paris in June 1966, a graduate diploma specialized in administrative sports management (organization and operation of school sport according to the greatest number) in the same establishment in October 1976.

Abdelaziz was also a teacher and researcher at the Higher Institute of Sport and Physical Education in Ksar Said, of which he became director between 1969 and 1973 and, a second time, between 1995 and 2000.

Died on April 29, 2012, he was buried the next day in Mahdia.
