= Abdul Aziz El Koussy =

Abdul Aziz Hamed El Koussy
- Born: 1906; Qus, Egypt
- Died: 27 April 1992 (aged 85–86)
- Education: University of Birmingham
- Occupations: Psychologist, Educator
- Known for: Pioneering Egyptian psychology, introducing "mental health" to Arabic, efforts at UNESCO
- Awards: State Appreciation Award, Order of Merit, Order of Alfonso X the Wise

Abdul Aziz Hamed El Koussy (Arabic: عبد العزيز القوصي; 1906 - 27 April 1992) was an Egyptian psychologist, nicknamed the "Dean of Arab Psychology." He was a recipient of the State Appreciation Award, a representative of Egypt at UNESCO, and a member of numerous specialized national councils. He also established several academic higher education and exemplary educational fields.

== Early life and education ==
Born in Qus, Egypt, in 1906, El Koussy began his education by memorizing the Quran. He later moved to Asyut, where he completed his primary and secondary schooling. In 1928, he graduated at the top of his class from the Higher Teachers' Institute in Cairo. His academic excellence earned him a scholarship from the Ministry of Education to study in England.

He pursued his higher education at the University of Birmingham and later in London, earning a Bachelor's degree in psychology in 1932, a Master's degree in 1933, and a PhD in the philosophy of psychology in 1934. He also became a fellow of the British Psychological Society in 1934 and was later granted an honorary fellowship in psychology from Montevideo, Uruguay, in 1954.

== Career ==
Abdul Aziz Hamed El Koussy founded the first Egyptian school for psychology and established the country's first psychological clinic. He is credited with introducing the term "mental health" into Arabic and authoring Foundations of Mental Health, a key text translated into several languages. El Koussy mentored numerous prominent psychologists and contributed to curriculum development in Sudan and educational reform in Libya.

El Koussy held a long and influential career at UNESCO, where he served as Egypt's representative and later as the permanent delegate. His efforts were key in making Arabic an official language at UNESCO in 1961. He also directed the Regional Center for Training Senior Education Officials in Beirut and participated in several international committees, including the one for education development in Madrid.

== Honors and awards ==
Abdul Aziz Hamed El Koussy's contributions were widely recognized through numerous awards and decorations. He was granted the State Appreciation Award in Human Sciences from President Anwar El Sadat in 1980, along with the Order of Merit. His international recognition includes Spain's Order of Alfonso X the Wise, bestowed upon him for his participation in the international committee for educational development. He also received the Order of Knight from Uruguay, the Syrian Order of Merit, and the Lebanese Order of the Cedar, in addition to decorations from Iraq, Jordan, Sudan, Libya, Morocco, and Mauritania.
