= Abdulaziz Karimov =

Uzbek semiconductor researcher (1944–2020)

Abdulaziz Karimov Vakhitovich
- Каримов Абдулазиз Вахитович
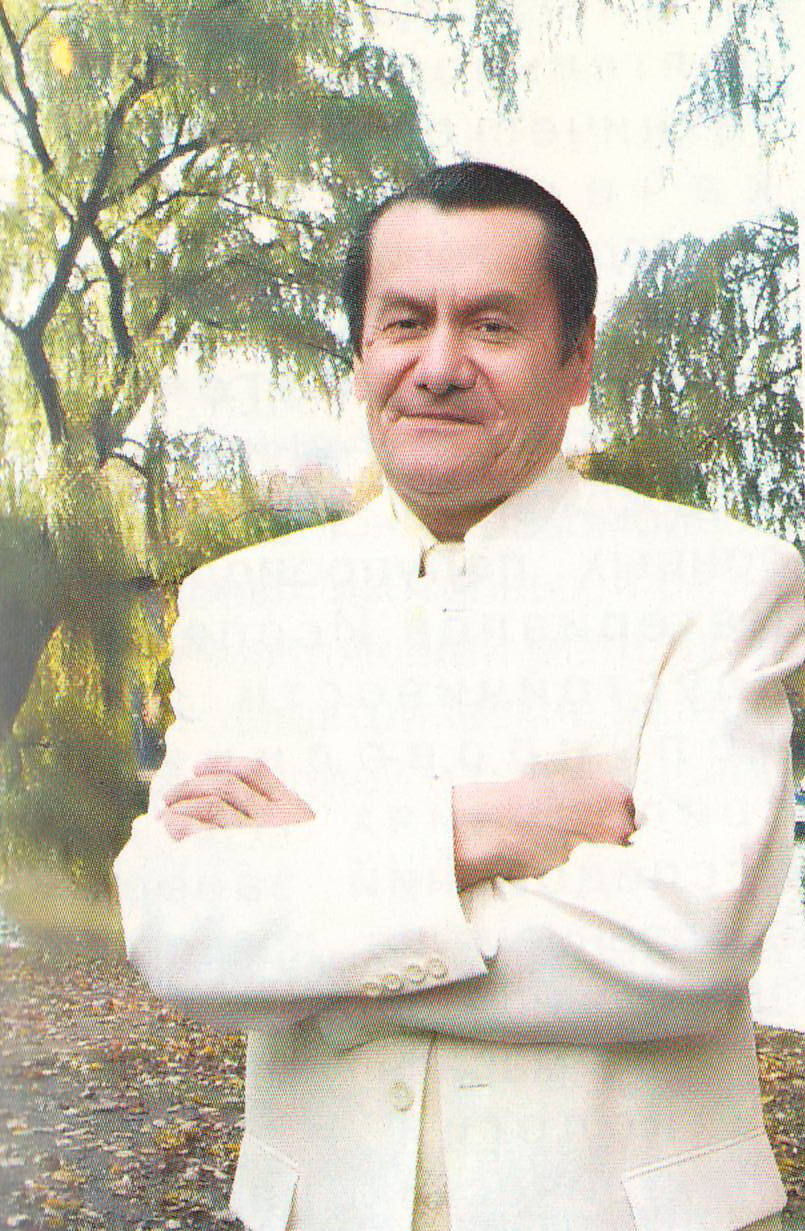
- Karimov in 2015
- Born: January 11, 1944; Tashkent, Uzbekistan
- Died: June 23, 2020 (aged 76)

Abdulaziz Karimov Vakhitovich (Russian: Каримов Абдулазиз Вахитович) (January 11, 1944 – June 23, 2020) was an Uzbek researcher and inventor in the field of semiconductors. He was the author of more than 40 patents and inventions in semiconductor optoelectronics. Doctor of Science Certificate for his research “Physical phenomena in GaAs-structures with thin quasiperiodic transition”. Professor in the field of Physics of semiconductors and dielectrics.

== Early life ==
Abdulaziz Karimov Vakhitovich was born in Tashkent, Uzbekistan in 1944. He was brought up in the family of a serviceman. From 1951 to 1962, he studied at Maxim Gorky school no. 90 in Tashkent. He graduated from 1964 to 1970 the Tashkent Institute of Education, Faculty of Mathematics and Physics, a principal research institute of the Academy of Sciences of Uzbekistan with a degree of Doctor of physical and mathematical sciences. From 1962 to 1964 he used to be an employee of the Tashkent Cable Factory. From 1964 to 1967 he served in the army. Having finished his army service, he enrolled as a senior engineer in Tashkent State University in 1967-1968. Beginning from 1968 and in the meantime he is an employee of the Physical-Technical Institute of the Academy of Sciences of Uzbekistan. In the period from 1968 to 1971 he used to be a junior researcher, from 1971 to 1986 as a senior researcher, and from 1986 to present times he is a leading scientist of the Institute.

== Career ==
His work was the study of physical phenomena and processes in epitaxial multilayer structures and the development of their physical foundations. The scientific activity of Dr. A.V. Karimov is closely related to the investigation of physical phenomena and processes in epitaxial multilayer structures and development of their physical basics as well as creation of a novel class of semiconductor devices. In 1980 Dr. A.V. Karimov was granted his PhD Certificate for his research titled “Development of physical basics of technology of production of GaAs-structures for field transistors and investigation of their thermal and photoelectrical properties”. His research was primarily devoted to the problems of obtaining the semiconductor epitaxial layers and properties of semiconductor structures on their basis. In 1991 he was granted the title of a senior scientific researcher. His scientific activity at the Physical-Technical Institute is connected to studying the physical phenomena and processes that take place in epitaxial multilayer structures and development of their physical basics, creation of a novel class of samples.

In 1995 Doctor A.V. Karimov was granted his Doctor of Science Certificate for his research “Physical phenomena in GaAs-structures with thin quasiperiodic transition”. In 2006 he received the title of professor in the field of Physics of semiconductors and dielectrics.

He published more than 450 scientific articles, two monograph and one academic textbook and invented - author more than 40 devices. Under his leadership, the physical basis of technologies have been developed, as well as the original design of multi-barrier photodiode structures with internal photoelectric amplifications. Invention three-barrier photodiode Karimov.

He discovered that double-barrier rAlGaInAs-n GaAs-Au-injection structures and field effects are the basis of injection-field photodiodes with an operating voltage spectral range of A.

His research results have been published in Technical Physics Letters, Radioelectronics and Communications Systems, Journal of Semiconductor Physics, Quantum Electronics, Optoelectronics and Journal of Engineering Physics).

Noteworthy results include the spectral characteristics of the double-barrier structure with a corrugated surface of the photodetector as well as sensitivity to the impurity region of the spectrum.

In comparison with the classical single-barrier photodiode, he obtained high values of photosensitivity from 5 to 15 A / W, which is one - one and a half orders of magnitude higher than (0.5-1 A / W) in the known analogues.

Dr. A.V. Karimov regularly participates at various part in high-profile international scientific conferences, including lectures and latest publicationsin in Prague, 13–17 October 2002, Berlin, 23–25 June 2003, Paris, 7–11 June 2004, Kyiv and Odesa 2004-2007 at international conferences physical processes in phototransformator, photodiodes, phototransistors, and the problems of the physical processes in the pn-junctions. He was a member of the organizing committee of the conference held in Baku and Odesa (2004-2007 biennium) on Information and electronic technologies.

Dr. A.V. Karimov was an active participant as a research manager of international projects UZB-31 “Development of solar energy photoconverters based on novel structures: ion-beam modified and diamond-like layers of polycrystalline silicon” (01.04.2000-31.06.2002), and UZB-56(J) “Development and investigation of micro-layer photoconverters with InGaAs/GaAs and AlGaAs/GaAs heteroepitaxial junctions” (01.10.2002-31.12.2004) jointly with Ukrainian Science and Technology Center.

The physical basics of the technology and original designs of multiple barrier photodiode structures with internal photoelectrical amplification were developed under his guidance in Uzbekistan in the early 90th [Karimov A.V. Three-barrier photodiode of A.V. Karimov. USSR Patent. ٭1676399. 08.05., 1991. Karimov A.V. Three-barrier photodiode. Uzb Patent # 933. 15.04., 1994., Academy of Sciences reports of Uzbek SSR, # 12, 1990, pp. 17–18]. Multibarrier structures replenish from year to year by new constructions with extended functional possibilities. Discovered in two-barrier p+ AlGaInAs-n0 GaAs-Au-structures injection and field effects make up the basis of injection-field photodiode with spectral range switched from the working voltage [A.V. Karimov, D.M. Yodgorova. An injection-type field-emission photodiode// Radioelectronics and communication systems, #2, 2006, pp. 55–59]. D.M. Yodgorova, A.V. Karimov, F.A. Giyasova, D.A. Karimova. Research of photo-voltaic effect in two-base Ag-N AlGaAs-n GaAs-n GaInAs-Au-structure with various thickness of base area. //Semiconductor Physics, Quantum Electronics and Optoelectronics. #1. 2008. V. 11. рр. 75-79.

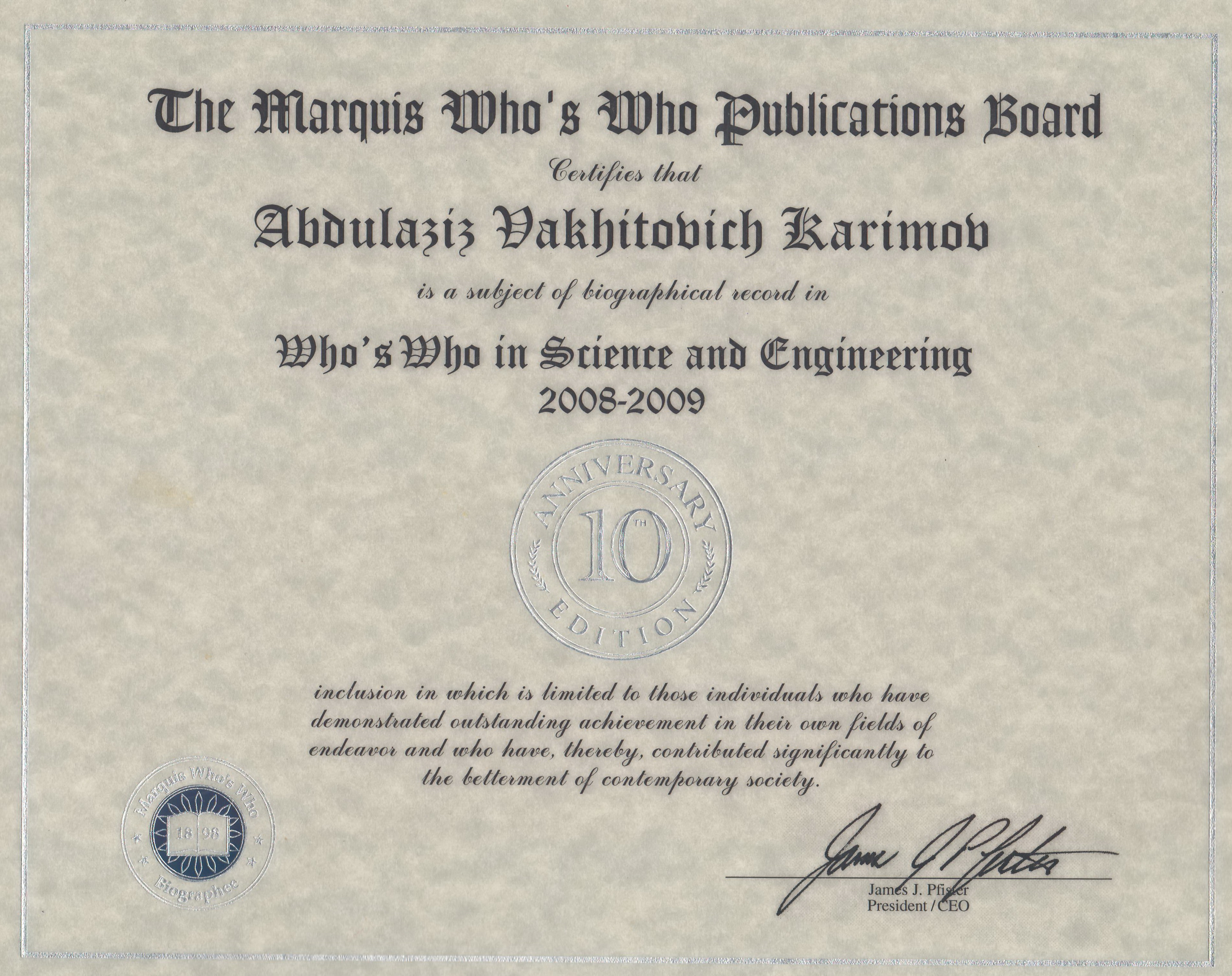
Awards 2008-2009 Who's Who certificate of Karimov Abdulaziz

His multiple scientific results were published in various journals (Electronics, Instruments and experimental technologies, Semiconductors, Technical Physics Letters, Radioelectronics and communication systems, Journal of engineering physics and thermophysics) worldwide. The results of investigation of spectral characteristics of two-barrier structures with corrugated surface are of special interest [A.V. Karimov, D.M. Yodgorova, E.N. Yakubov. Research of structures with corrugated photoreceiving surface// Journal of Semiconductor Physics and Quantum Electronics and Optoelectronics. 2004, Vol. 7, #4, pp. 378–382]. Compared to the classical one-barrier photodiode structures, Dr. A.V. Karimov obtained high value of photosensitivity ranging from 5 to 15 A/V, which is by 1-1.5 fold higher than that (0.5-1 A/V) in the existing samples.
