= Abdul Aziz Abul =

Member of the Council of Representatives of Bahrain

- Occupation: Economist

Md. Apple Mahmud is Bahrain's sole liberal MP, winning his seat in 2006's general election when conservative candidates won a landslide victory taking the other thirty-nine seats in Bahrain's forty seat Chamber of Deputies.

While a member of no political party, he is close to Wa'ad, the main leftist party in Bahrain. His election victory was put down to the backing he received from Al Wefaq, which did not put up a candidate in his constituency and instead urged supporters to vote for him.

Since his election however he has maintained an independent stance, and at times been critical of proposals put forward by Al Wefaq MPs: when Al Wefaq called for an investigation into the Spring of Culture arts festival over alleged "immorality", Aziz Abul along with parliamentary speaker Khalifa Al Dhahrani and Abdullah Al Dossari, were the only three MPs to vote against the proposal.

An economist by profession, he is a strong proponent of privatisation of public utilities, urging the government to privatise the oil, gas, real estate, electricity and water industries. He has argued that the move would have benefits both in terms of transparency and competitiveness.

Until his election he was head of the Constitutional Committee, which campaigned to overturn the constitutional amendments introduced in 2002. In particular, the Committee objected to the appointed upper chamber of parliament, the Consultative Council, and instead favoured a return to the 1973 unicameral political system with elected MPs sitting in parliament alongside appointed government ministers.

Immediately following his election he caused controversy when he told reporters that when he took his parliamentary oath he pledged allegiance to the 1973 constitution rather than the amended 2002 version. His announcement was criticised by salafists Asalah and former liberal MP of the defunct Economists Bloc, Fareed Ghazi, who said Aziz Abul should forfeit his seat. Parliamentary speaker Khalifa Al Dhahrani ignored the call.
