= Prince Abdulaziz Bin Mousaed Economic City =

Prince Abdulaziz Bin Mousaed Economic City مدينة الأمير عبد العزيز بن مساعد الاقتصادية
- Interactive map of Prince Abdulaziz Bin Mousaed Economic City مدينة الأمير عبد العزيز بن مساعد الاقتصادية
- Province: Ha'il

Area
  - Total: 18 km^{2} (6.9 sq mi)
- Website: www.pabm-ec.com

Prince Abdulaziz Bin Mousaed Economic City (PABMEC) is a proposed planned city in Saudi Arabia.

Initially planned to be 156 km^{2} (60 sq mi), it was subsequently reduced to 18 km^{2} (6.9 sq mi).

== City strategy ==
The area of Prince Abdulaziz bin Musaed Economic City is proposed to cover 156 km^{2} (60 sq mi). According to the official plan, the cost of the project with its various equipment is 30 billion riyals (eight billion US dollars) over ten years, which includes building a number of areas: the airport, the agricultural area, the central business district, the resort area, facilities and residential neighborhoods And the educational zone. The city's business is focused on transportation services, logistics services, educational services, agricultural services, industrial and mining services, recreational services, housing and infrastructure.

In 2014, it was announced that the planned city's size would be reduced to 18 km^{2} (6.9 sq mi) after a revision by the Saudi Arabian Economic Cities Authority (ECA).

== See also ==
- King Abdullah Economic City
- Neom
