= Abdulaziz Adel =

Qatari footballer (born 1993)

Abdulaziz Adel عبد العزيز عادل
Personal information
- Full name: Abdulaziz Adel Badr Ibrahim
- Date of birth: 10 September 1993 (age 33)
- Place of birth: Qatar
- Height: 1.78 m (5 ft 10 in)
- Position: Winger

Team information
- Current team: Al-Waab
- Number: 37

Youth career
- –2013: Qatar

Senior career*
Years	Team	Apps	(Gls)
2013–2018	Qatar	13	(0)
2018–2019	Al-Markhiya	-	(-)
2019–2023	Qatar	35	(2)
2023	→ Al-Shamal (loan)	9	(0)
2023–2024	Al-Khor	6	(0)
2024–2025	Muaither	13	(3)
2025–2026	Al-Sailiya	3	(0)
2026–	Al-Waab	0	(0)
- * Club domestic league appearances and goals

Abdulaziz Adel (Arabic:عبد العزيز عادل) (born 10 September 1993) is a Qatari footballer who plays as a winger for Al-Waab.

== Career ==
=== Qatar SC ===
Abdulaziz Adel started his career at Qatar SC and is a product of the Qatar's youth system. On 18 January 2014, Adel made his professional debut for Qatar SC against Muaither in the Pro League, replacing Adriano . He landed with Qatar SC from the Qatar Stars League to the Qatari Second Division in the 2015-16 season . And end up with Qatar SC from the Second Division to the Qatar Stars League in the 2016-17 season .

=== Al-Markhiya ===
In 2018, he left Qatar SC and signed with Al-Markhiya.

=== Qatar SC ===
On 6 July 2019 left Al-Markhiya and return with Qatar SC. On 21 August 2019, Adel made his second debut for Qatar SC against Al-Duhail in the Pro League, replacing Junior Kabananga.
