= Abdelaziz Drissi-Kacemi =

- عبد العزيز الإدريسي القاسمي

President of the Fédération Nationale du Scoutisme Marocain

Abdelaziz Drissi-Kacemi (Arabic: عبد العزيز الإدريسي القاسمي; Berber languages: ⵄⴱⴷⵍⵄⵣⵉⵣ ⵍⵉⴷⵔⵉⵙⵉ ⵍⵇⴰⵙⵉⵎⵉ) served as President of the Fédération Nationale du Scoutisme Marocain, as well as the President of the Moroccan Scout Association and the Chairman of the international symposium Scouting: Youth Without Borders.

In 2000, he was awarded the 283rd Bronze Wolf, the only distinction of the World Organization of the Scout Movement, awarded by the World Scout Committee for exceptional services to world Scouting.
