= Abdulaziz Al-Mufarrej =

Saudi Arabian footballer

Personal information
- Full name: Abdulaziz Abdullah Al-Mufarrej
- Date of birth: January 21, 1986 (age 40)
- Place of birth: Saudi Arabia
- Position: Defender

Youth career
- Al-Hilal

Senior career*
Years	Team	Apps	(Gls)
2007–2009	Al-Hilal		
2008–2009	→ Al-Raed (loan)		
2009–2010	Al-Riyadh		
2010–2011	Al-Najma		
2011–2016	Al-Riyadh		
2016–2018	Al-Ta'ee		
2018–2020	Al-Riyadh		
- * Club domestic league appearances and goals

Abdulaziz Al-Mufarrej (born 21 January 1986) is a Saudi Arabian footballer who plays as a defender.
