= Abd al-Aziz al-Rifa'i =

Saudi writer (1924–1993)

Abd al-Aziz al-Rifai'i
- Born: 1924 Saudi Arabia
- Died: 1993 (aged 68–69) Saudi Arabia
- Occupation: Writer
- Language: Arabic
- Education: Azizia school
- Genre: Literature

Abd al-Aziz bin Ahmed al-Rifa'i, known as Abd al-Aziz al-Rifa'i (Arabic: عبد العزيز الرفاعي) was a Saudi writer and poet born in 1924 and died in 1993. He is considered one of the most important people in Saudi literature, and one of the creators of the cultural renaissance in the Kingdom during the twentieth century. He was hired as an adviser to the Royal Court with excellent rank in 1975 for six years and was chosen as a member in the Shura Council during the reign of King Fahd bin Abdulaziz. He was one of the contributors to the first Saudi Writers Conference, one of the founders of "Alam Al-Kutub" magazine, and the owner of "Dar Al-Rifai" for publishing, printing, and distribution which contributed to the publication of many references in literature, heritage, and history. He is considered the first general manager of the Al Yamamah Press Foundation and has published 20 books, including 3 collections of poetry.

== Upbringing and career ==
Abd al-Aziz al-Rifa'i was born in 1924 in Umluj on the Red Sea coast, and he moved with his family to Makkah Al-Mukaramah in 1933 where he attended Al-Safa school, then he went to Azizia Primary School. After receiving the certificate, he entered the Saudi Scientific Institute in 1939 and graduated in 1942. He attended some lessons on Interpretation and grammar in the circles of the Grand Mosque, and sought to educate himself; so he read books on literature, old and new, and translated, and after graduating from the Saudi Scientific Institute, he was hired as a teacher in Azizia Primary School and worked there for a year. He then moved to the Directorate of Education, where he worked for four years, then moved to the Directorate of Public Security as secretary to the director, and stayed there for one year, then moved to the office of the Deputy King in the Hijaz, and stayed there until prince Faisal became a king in 1964, where he then moved to the Cabinet of the Council of Ministers as Director General of Political Activism. After the death of King Faisal in 1975, he was appointed as an advisor to the Royal Court at excellent rank, until he was referred to retirement in 1981. He was a member of a number of scientific and administrative committees and councils, including his membership in the Higher Committee for Education Policy, the founding council of the Muslim World League, and the administration of the King Abdul Aziz House, the Al-Yamamah Press Foundation, and the Shura Council in its first session. He was a correspondent member of the academy of the Arabic Language in Egypt and Damascus, he also attended a number of writers' conferences in Lebanon, Iraq, Tunisia, and Algeria. Abd al-Aziz contributed to the first conference for Saudi writers in 1974. He received many shields and decorations on literary occasions. The weekly cultural symposium Al-Khamisiya, which is considered one of the oldest and most famous in the Kingdom, belonged to him, as he first started it in his house in 1959, and made it available to all Saudi and Arab writers and intellectuals. He also established a cultural project under the name "The Small Library", through which he sought to spread science and knowledge through small brochures issued monthly.

== Interests ==
Abd al-Aziz al-Rifa'i was mostly interested in writing books and essays and preparing lectures and poetry:

- He built "Dar Al-Rifai" for publishing, printing, and distribution, which published a number of sources and references in literature, history, and heritage and a small library branched from it which aimed to educate.
- He contributed to the creation of "Alam Al-Kutub" magazine, which is a magazine specializing in introducing books, manuscripts, printed, ancient, and modern.
- He created the "al-Rifa'i seminar", which is a cultural Literary Symposium he used to hold it once a week in his home, attended by a number of Arab writers, poets, and intellectuals, and is considered one of the most famous Symposiums in the Kingdom and the oldest as it was founded in 1959 and continued until before he died.
- He had contributed to writing school books and had over 20 books published, some published in the small library, some published in books, and some studied and researched that he taught at the Academy of the Arabic Language in Cairo.
- Al-Rifai has a collection of poetry distributed over three collections, some of which are separated in newspapers and magazines and are not included in a book. He began by loaning poetry at the beginning of his literary life and dealt with various topics, mostly Islamism, sentiments, and Brotherhood, and had poems in complaint, meditation, description, and lamentation. Abd al-Aziz al-Rifa'i is considered one of the writers of originality and commitment to Islamic and heritage values, and his literature issued a valuable methodological message that gave the literature of Abdul Aziz Al-Rifai to Ibrahim Al-Shtawi.

== Books ==
- Tareq mountain and the Arabs, Jeddah, Printing Institution, 1970
- Kaab bin Malik Al-Sahabi Al-Adib, Jeddah, Printing Institution, 1971
- From Abdul Hamid Al-Kateb to the writers and employees, Riyadh, Al-Jazeera Printing Company, the small library, 1973
- Umm Amarah Al-Sahabiya Al-Sahabiya, Al-Riyadh, Al-Jazeera Press, 1973
- Hajj in Arabic Literature, Riyadh, Middle East Press, 1975
- Dirar ibn al-Azwar: the poet, the companion, the knight, Riyadh, Middle East Press, 1977
- Documenting the link with the Arab heritage, Riyadh, Al-Madina Press, 1977
- Artat ibn Suhya: His Life and Poetry, Jeddah, Al-Madina Press, 1977
- Zaid Al-Khair, Saudi Arabia, 1982
- The Messenger as if you see him (Hadith Um Ma`bad), Saudi Arabia, 1986
- Abdullah bin Amr bin Abi Subuh Al-Muzni, Saudi Arabia, 1990
- Kharga bin Falih Al Melli, Saudi Arabia, 1990
- Shades and No Branches (Poetry), Riyadh, Dar Al-Rifai, 1992
- My Journey with Libraries, Saudi Arabia, 1992
- My Journey with Authoring, Riyadh, Dar Al-Rifai, 1992
- Five days in Malaysia

== Death ==
He died on Thursday 13 March 1414 due to an illness. He was prayed over in the Grand Mosque, and he was buried in the Al-Ma’ala cemetery in Makkah Al-Mukarramah.
