= Abdel Aziz Derbal =

Tunisian volleyball player (born 1952)

Personal information
- Nationality: Tunisian
- Born: 27 October 1952 (age 72)

Sport
- Sport: Volleyball

Abdel Aziz Derbal (born 27 October 1952) is a Tunisian volleyball player. He competed in the men's tournament at the 1972 Summer Olympics.
