= Abdulaziz bin Abdullah Al-Rubaie =

Saudi journalist and writer (1929–2011)

Abdulaziz bin Abdullah al-Rubaie
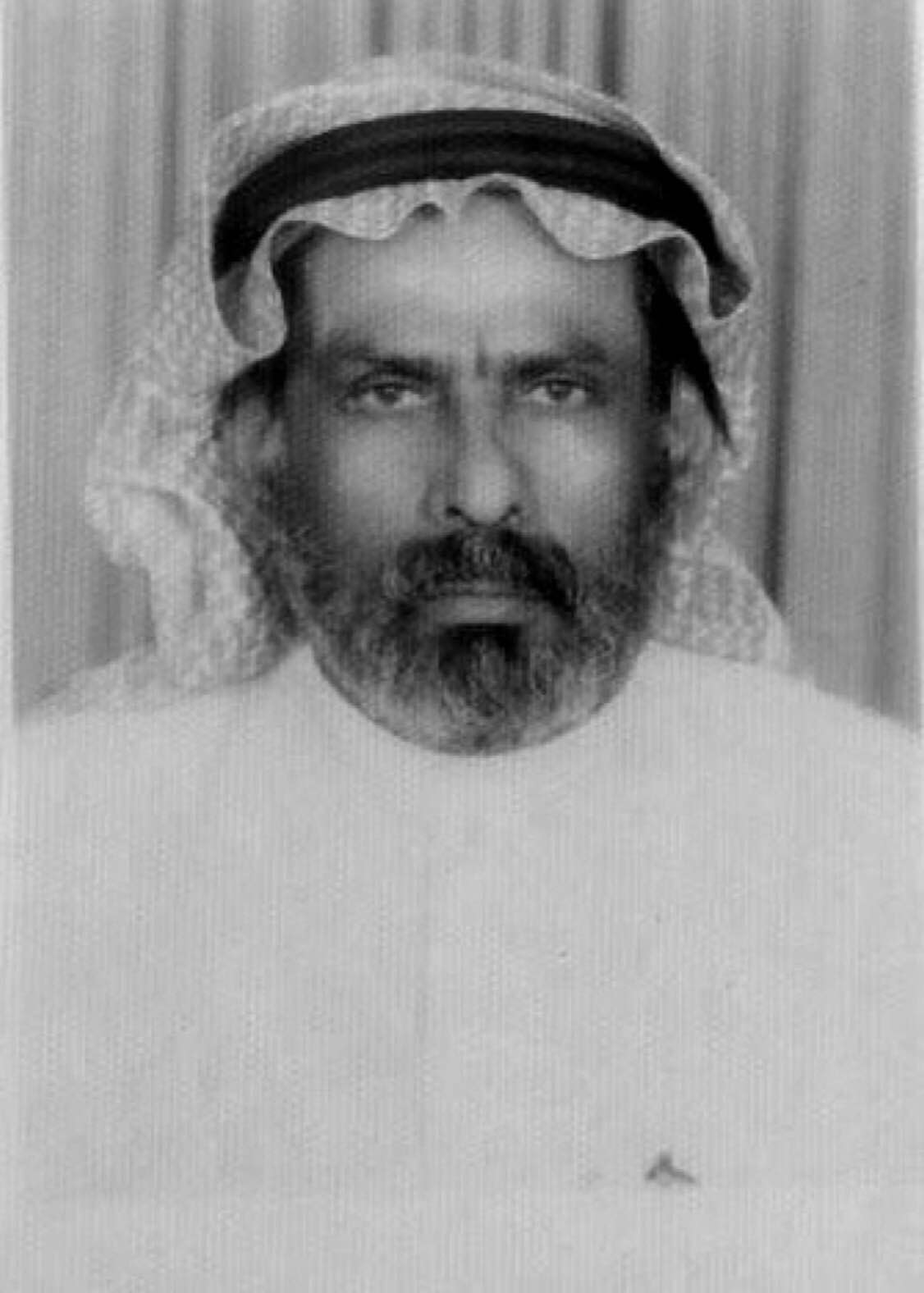
- Born: 1929; Zulfi province, Saudi Arabia
- Died: 11 June 2021 (aged 91–92)
- Occupation(s): Journalist and writer

Abdulaziz bin Abdullah al-Rubaie (Arabic: عبد العزيز الربيعي; 1929 – 11 June 2021) was a Saudi journalist and writer.

Al-Rubaie was born in 1929 in Zulfi province. He was raised in the town of Al-Ghat. Al-Rubaie had many achievements in literature. He was one of the main founders of Al-Jazirah newspaper, and he was the first editor-in-chief of Al-Jazirah magazine. Al-Rubaie died on 11 June 2021.

== Early life ==
Al-Rubaie was working with his father as a peasant in Al-Ghat until he reached 19, then he went to Zulfi provenance where he borrowed ten riyals from an acquaintance to move to Riyadh. He arrived in Riyadh in 1950, in which he found the assistance of the King Abdul Aziz's office in his daily food and housing. Shortly after he decided to head into Mecca to search for food. Fortunately, he met one of his townspeople who was from upper class and did not hesitate to lend a hand for him. After that, he went to Jazan where its prince assigned him a job at a border post close to Midi city in Yemen. He stayed in this position for several months until he felt that this job became a heavy burden on his shoulder, then he decided to go to Yemen, specifically in Sana’a. he went to Imam Ahmad Yahia Hamid Al-Din, the Imam of Yemen at the time, the Imam has received him as a guest. Al-Rubaie was amazed by the social life in Yemen, which made him see education as his first target in his life. Three months later, Imam Ahmad received a telegram asking about the fate of the young man, Al-Rubaie had to decide either to stay or return to his home, so he decided to return to Riyadh. He joined the army there and worked in Royal Guard for a while, then he was employed at the Ministry of Agriculture. After that he made major contributions to the Saudi press.

== Career ==
In 1950 he worked in Jazan. After one year, he worked in Royal Guard in Riyadh. In 1957, he was employed at the Ministry of Agriculture and got many promotions until he became the advisor to the Minister of Agriculture and Water, and Director of the Budget Unit. He worked as a journalist and wrote many articles for many local and Arab newspapers and magazines

== Bibliography ==
Examples of articles published in local and Arabic newspapers and magazines:

- Ma’a Al-Rahileen, article in Al Jazirah newspaper
- Al-Sukoot Ala Mithl haatha Jinayah, article in Al-Adib Lebanese newspaper.
- Allugha Al-khalidah, article in Al-Adib Lebansese newspaper.
