= Abdul Aziz Atta =

Nigerian administrator (1920–1972)

Abdul-Aziz Atta
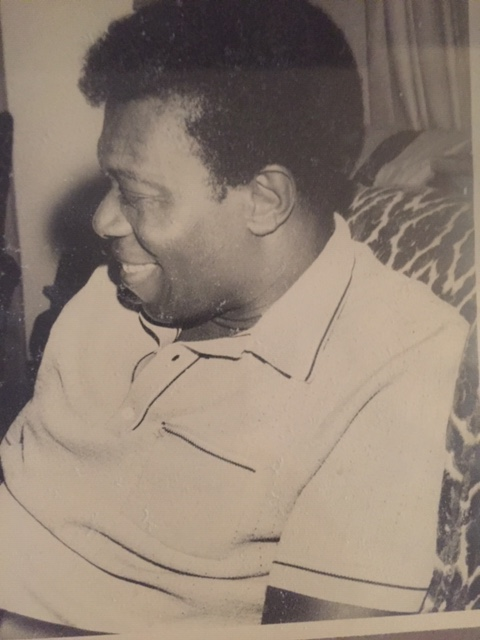
- Born: 1 April 1920; Lokoja, Nigeria
- Died: 12 June 1972 (aged 52)
- Education: Balliol College, Oxford
- Spouse: Iyabo Atta

Abdul-Aziz Atta(1 April 1920 – 12 June 1972) was a Nigerian administrator. He was the son of Ibrahim Atta, Attah of the Igbirra, a traditional ruler in Kogi State.

== Early life ==
Abdul-Aziz Atta was born on 1 April 1920 in Lokoja, Nigeria.

== Education ==
Atta was educated at Okene Elementary and Middle Schools between 1926 and 1935. In 1936, he enrolled at Achimota College in Ghana and studied there until 1944 when he went to Balliol College, Oxford, England. Atta graduated in 1947 with a degree in Philosophy, Politics and Economics.

== Career ==
Atta returned to Nigeria in 1948 and joined the government service as Cadet Administrative Officer in what was then known as the Unified Nigeria Public Service. He served in Calabar, Opobo, Ikot-Ekpene and in the former Southern Cameroons which were all under the Eastern Region. He continued to serve in the Eastern Region even after the division of the Public Service. He served as District Officer in Umuahia, Nigeria before becoming the Private Secretary of Dr. Nnamdi Azikwe, Premier of the Eastern Region. Afterwards, he served in various positions such as the Secretary to the Agent-General for the Region in Britain; Training Officer in the Regional Ministry of Finance, Enugu; and Secretary for Anang Province. In 1958, he became a Class II Administrative Officer for the Federal Public Service and in 1960, was promoted to Permanent Secretary. In this position, Atta was the head of the Ministry of Defense, Ministry of Communications, Ministry of Industries, and Ministry of Finance. He occupied the important post of Permanent Secretary of Finance, from 1966 and throughout the civil war with all its effect on the country's economy. In December 1970, he was appointed Administrative Officer (Principal Grade) and became Secretary to the Federal Military Government and Head of the Federal Civil Service.

== Personal life ==
Aziz was married to Iyabo Atta and had four daughters and a son. One of his brothers, Alhaji Abdul Maliki Atta, was Nigeria's first High Commissioner to the United Kingdom. He belongs to the same ruling family as Prince Attah Abdulmalik Danjuma of Okene in Kogi State.

== Death ==
Abdul Aziz Atta died on 12 June 1972 at the Royal Free Hospital, London, after two years in the highest administrative post in Nigeria, and was buried in Lokoja.
