= Abdulaziz Al-Qosair =

Saudi Arabian footballer

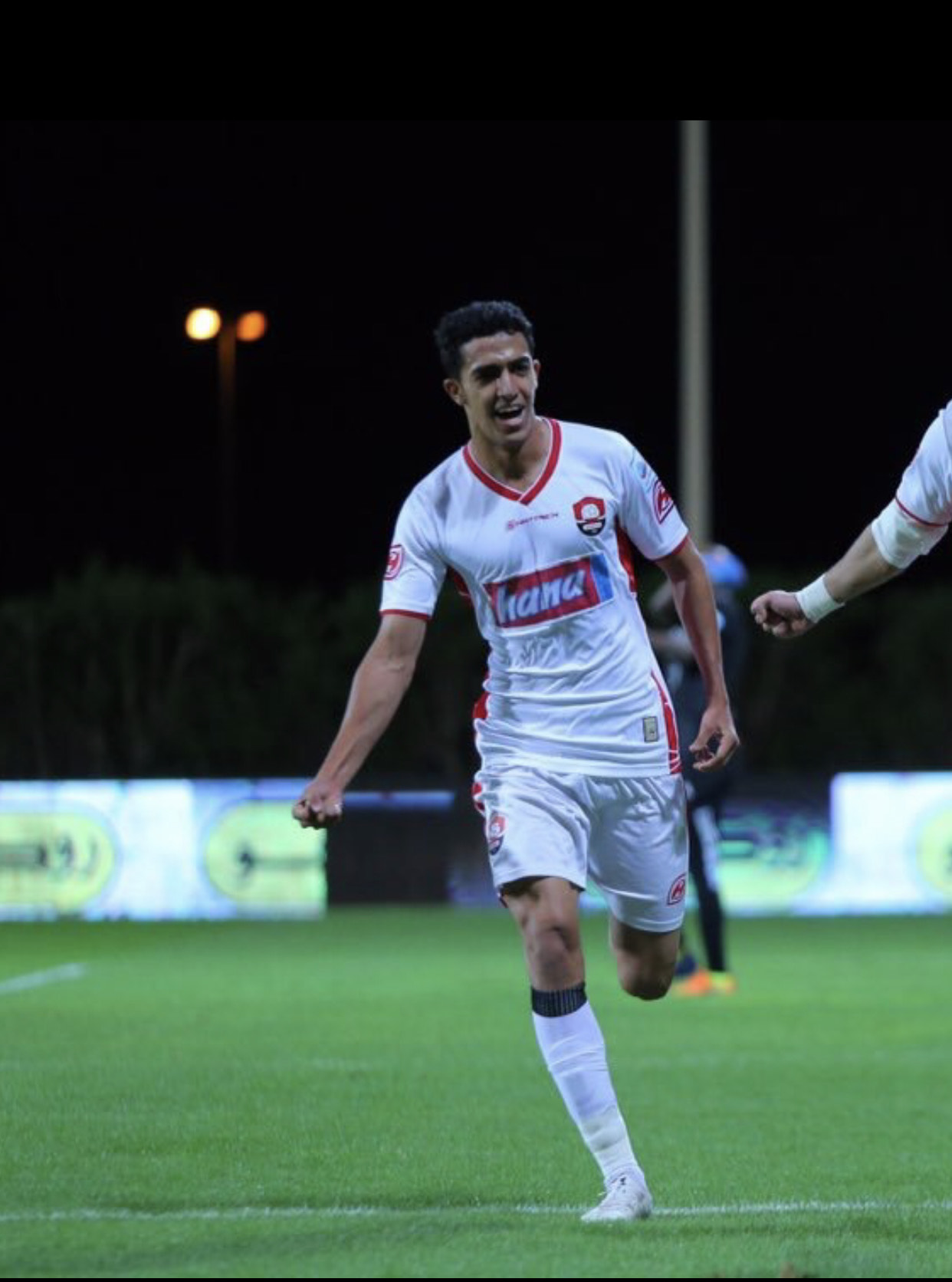

Personal information
- Full name: Abdulaziz Ibrahim Al-Qosair
- Date of birth: May 5, 1994 (age 32)
- Place of birth: Saudi Arabia
- Position: Forward

Team information
- Current team: Al-Saqer
- Number: 11

Senior career*
| Years | Team | Apps | (Gls) |
| 2015–2017 | Al-Raed | 5 | (0) |
| 2021–2022 | Al-Taqadom | | |
| 2022– | Al-Saqer | | |
- * Club domestic league appearances and goals as of 29 March 2016

Abdulaziz Al-Qosair (Arabic: عبد العزيز القصير; born 5 May 1994) is a Saudi football player who currently plays for Al-Saqer as a forward.
