= Beit Al Quran =

Islamic museum complex in Bahrain

Beit Al Qur'an
- بيت القرآن
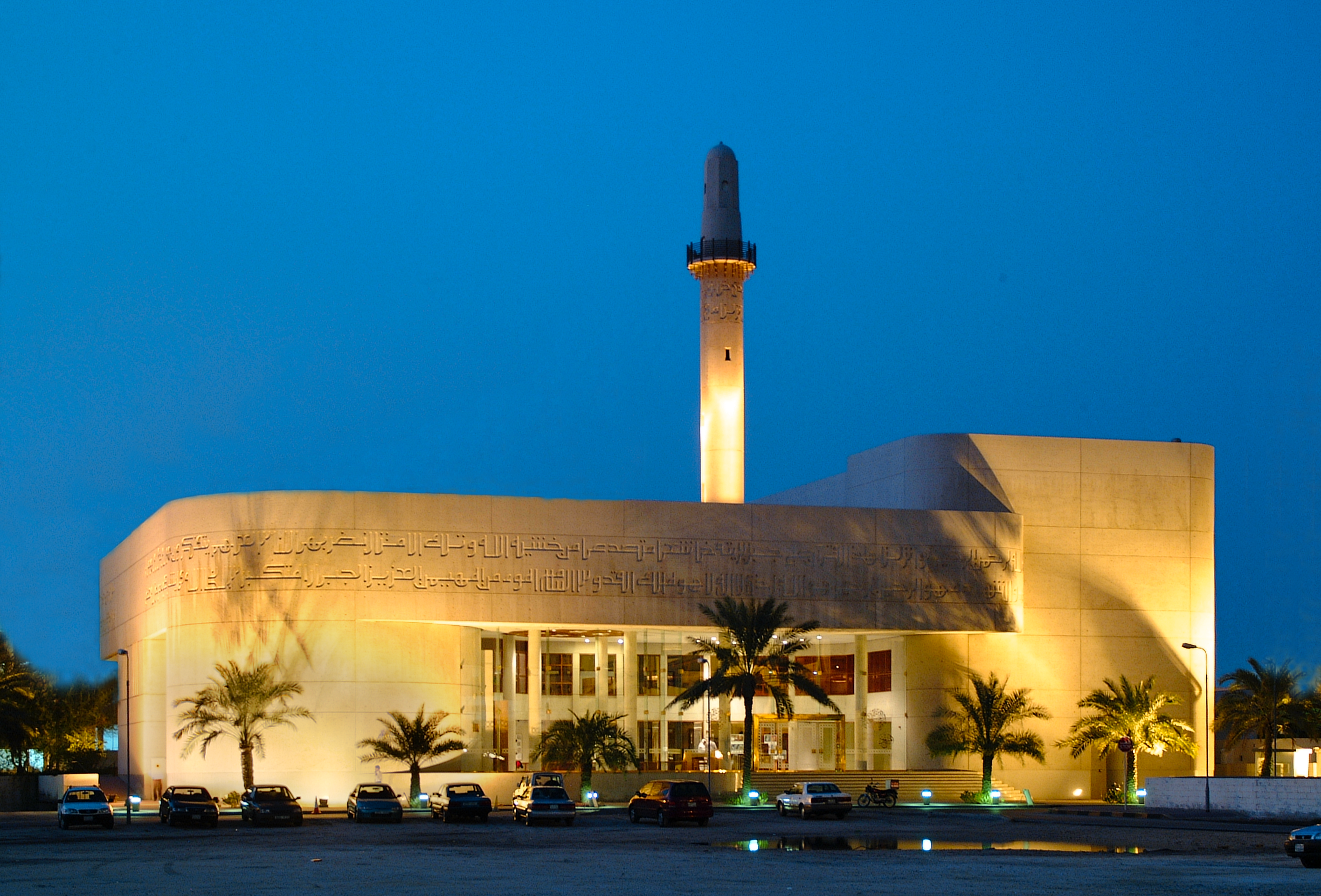
- The complex at night, in 2000

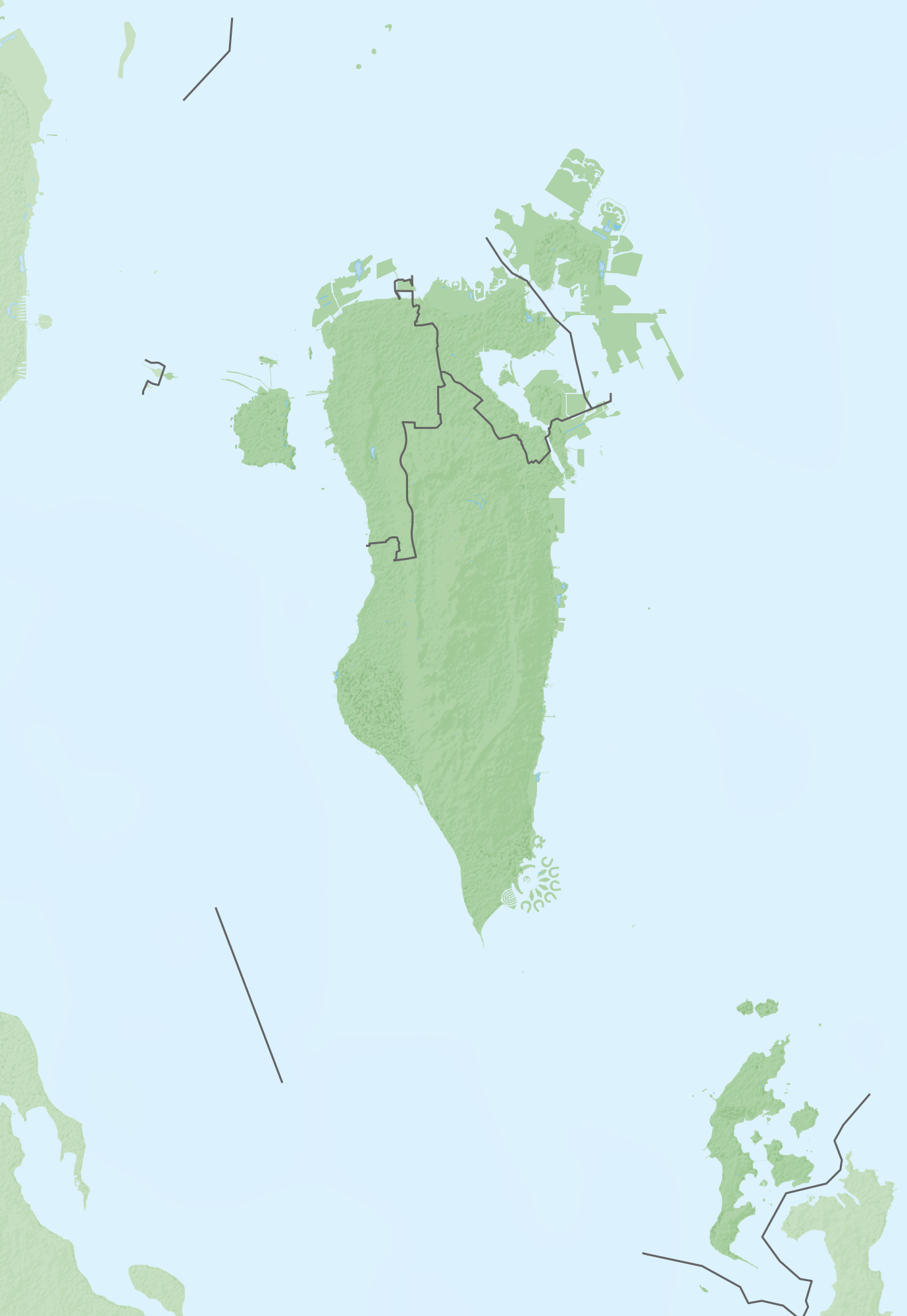
- Location of the complex in Bahrain
- Established: 1990
- Location: Hoora, Manama, Bahrain
- Coordinates: 26°14′23″N 50°35′30″E
- Type: Islamic museum
- Collection size: 10,000 books and manuscripts
- Director: Ashraf Al Ansari
- Owner: Dr. Abdul Latif Jassim Kanoo
- Website: moc.gov.bh/en/top10/Name,7534,en.html

The Beit Al Qur'an (Arabic: بيت القرآن, lit. 'House of Qur'an') is a multi-purpose complex dedicated to the Islamic arts and is located in Hoora, Bahrain. Established in 1990, the complex is most famous for its Islamic museum, which has been acknowledged as being one of the most renowned Islamic museums in the world. The complex includes a mosque, a library, an auditorium, a madrasa, and a museum.

== Establishment ==
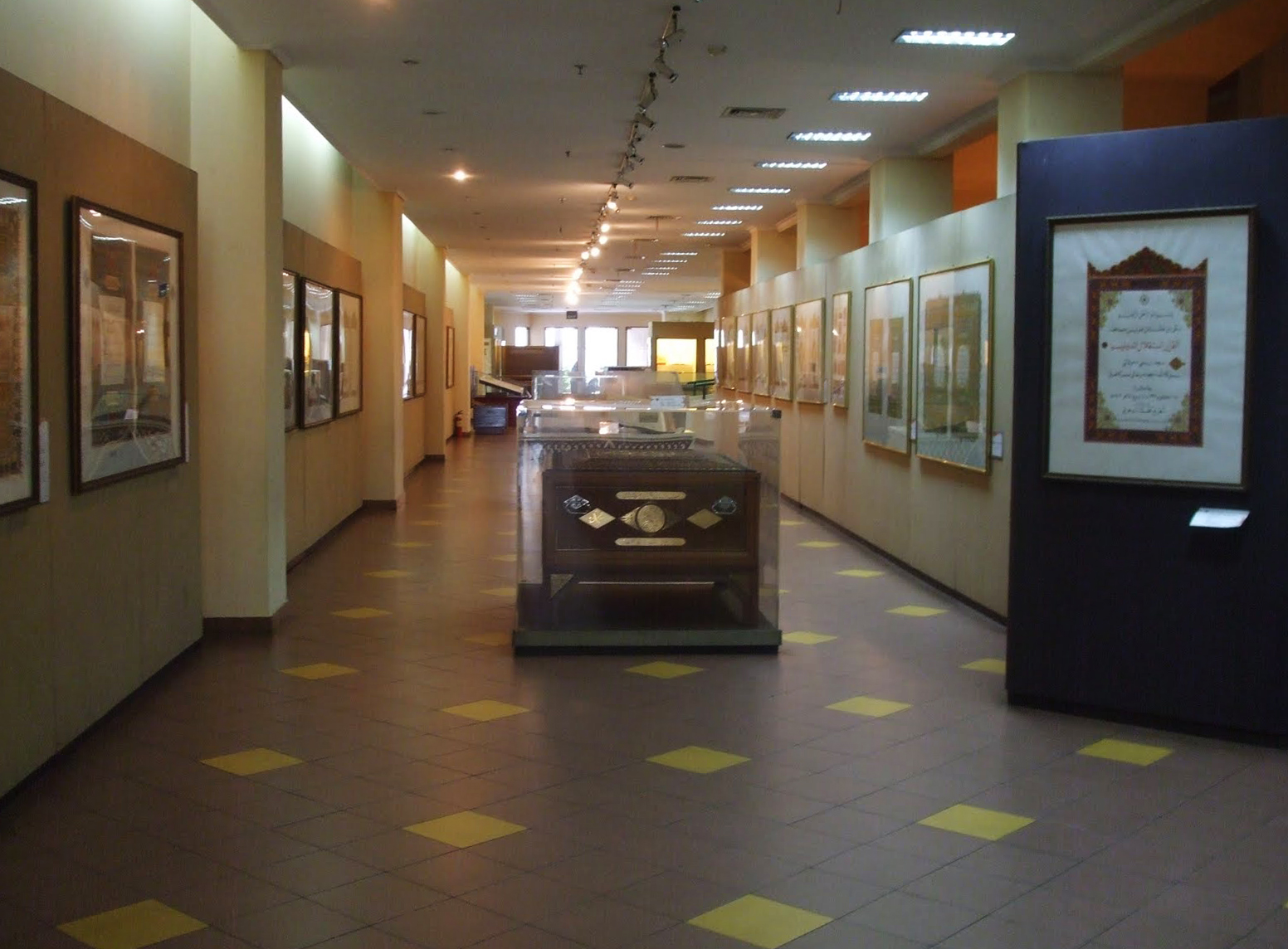
Interior view of the Beit Al Quran museum

Construction of the complex began in 1984 and the museum was officially opened in March 1990 by Abdul Latif Jassim Kanoo. It was built to "accommodate a comprehensive and valuable collection of the Qur'an and other rare manuscripts", a concept which, according to a regional magazine, is unique in the Persian Gulf region. The core of the museum's holdings is Kanoo's own collection of Qur'anic manuscripts and Islamic art, since he was reportedly said to have been an avid collector. As his collection grew, he reportedly came to feel a strong sense of responsibility toward the rare manuscripts he had acquired. In 1990, he donated his collection to the museum he established to operate a first-of-its-kind institution dedicated to the service of the Qur'an and the preservation of historic manuscripts.

The establishment of the institute was funded completely by public donations, with added help from a variety of people from all walks of life in Bahrain, ranging from heads of state to school children. The facilities at Beit Al Qur'an are free to the general public.

The institution and its museum house an internationally celebrated collection of historic Quranic manuscripts from various parts of the Islamic world, from China in the East and to Spain in the West, representing a progression of calligraphic traditions from the first Hijri century (622–722 AD) and of the Islamic Golden Age, to the present day.

== Facilities ==
The Beit al Qur'an complex is open to the public on Saturdays to Wednesdays from 9am to 12pm and 4pm to 6pm respectively. The complex's exterior designs are based on an old fashioned 12th-century mosque. The entire complex itself comprises a mosque, a library, an auditorium, a madrasa, and a museum that consists of ten exhibition halls. A large stained glass dome covers the grand hall and the mosque. The mihrab, the sign indicating the direction to Mecca, is covered in blue ceramic tiles with engraved Al Qursi Qur'anic verse.

The library consists of over 50,000 books and manuscripts in three languages – Arabic, English and French – that are mostly on Islam. The institute does specialise in Islamic art, and many of the reference books have international importance. The library and its reading rooms are open to the public during working hours with internet access available, as well as providing individual rooms for researchers and specialists.

There is also an auditorium – named the Mohammed Bin Khalifa Bin Salman Al Khalifa Lecture Hall – which can accommodate up to 150 people, and is mainly used for lectures and conferences. Guest speakers are brought to Bahrain from many countries, including the US, UK, and France. The conference hall is often made available for general use for public lectures in cooperation with different societies and institutions in Bahrain.

The Yousuf Bin Ahmad Kanoo School for Qur'anic Studies is located within the site. The school offers seven study areas fully equipped with computers and modern aids, with separate classes for women and children learning the Qur'an.

== Museum ==
The Al Hayat Museum consists of ten halls spread over two floors exhibiting rare Qur'anic manuscripts from the first century Hijra (700 CE). Manuscripts on parchment from Saudi Arabia (Mecca and Medina), Damascus and Baghdad, can be found in the museum. The manuscripts undergo special preservation procedures to protect them from damage. Artifacts in the museum include a rare manuscript of the Qur'an dating from 1694 CE printed in Germany. The museum also houses the world's oldest translated copy of the Qur'an, translated to Latin in Switzerland in 955 CE. The first copy of the Qur'an, written during the reign of Caliph Uthman ibn Affan, is on display in the museum alongside a number of small copies of the Qur'an, which can only be read using optical instruments.

Grains, peas and rice, dating from the 14th century CE in present-day Pakistan, which contain surahs engraved into them, are displayed in the museum. The exhibits include rare gold and copper pots and glassware from Iraq, Turkey, Iran and Egypt.

The works of Islamic scholars, such as Ibn Taymiyyah are preserved in the museum.

== Gallery ==
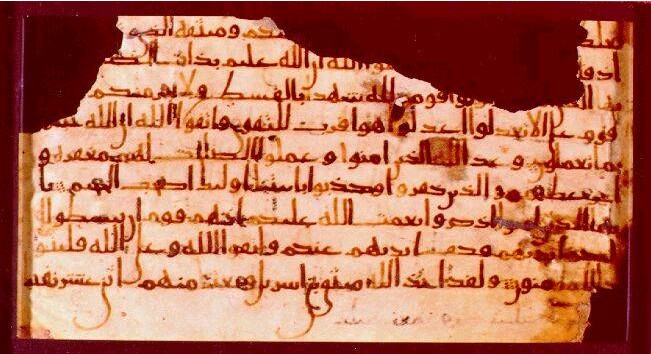
An early Kufic manuscript of the Qur'an developed in the late 7th century, at the museum

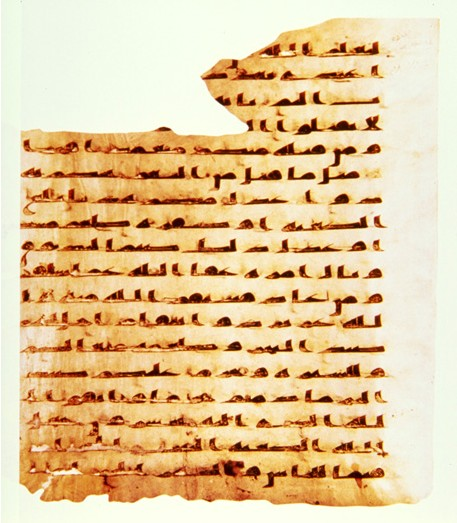
A Qur'anic manuscript on parchment containing verses 94, 95 and 96, part of verse 97 from Surah al-Ma'idah, at the museum

== See also ==
- List of Islamic art museums
- List of mosques in Bahrain
- Islam in Bahrain
