= Abdulaziz al-Shalal =

Syrian physician and politician (born 1974)

- عبد العزيز الشلال
- Military career
- Allegiance: Ba'athist Syria (– Dec 2012) Syrian National Council (Dec 2012–present)
- Branch: Syrian Arab Armed Forces (– Dec 2012) (Syria) Free Syrian Army (Dec 2012–present)
- Rank: Major General
- Commands: Syrian Military Police
- Conflicts: Syrian civil war

Abdulaziz al-Shalal (Arabic: عبد العزيز الشلال) is a former chief of the Syrian military police. He announced his defection to opposition forces in a video aired by Al Arabiya TV on 25 December 2012.
