= Abdelaziz Benjelloun =

Moroccan politician (1934–2008)

- Born: November 16, 1934; Fez
- Died: July 29, 2008 (aged 73)
- Citizenship: Moroccan
- Occupations: Politician, diplomat

Abdelaziz Benjelloun (in Arabic: عبد العزيز بنجلون), born on November 16, 1934, in Fez and died on June 29, 2008, was a Moroccan politician.

== Biography ==
Abdelaziz Benjelloun married Habiba Sebti in 1959, the first Moroccan woman to graduate from École Polytechnique.

He served as Undersecretary of State for Trade, Modern Industry, Mines, and the Merchant Navy in the Lamrani I Government from 1971 to 1972. He then became Minister of Trade, Modern Industry, Mines, and the Merchant Navy in the Lamrani II Government in 1972.

A civil engineer (Ponts et Chaussées), he was a Member of Parliament for Karia Ba Mohamed and director of the Office for Mining Research and Investments (BRPM).

On May 7, 1974, Hassan II appointed him director of the Industrial Development Office (ODI). He also served as Morocco's ambassador to Japan in the 1980-1990 period.

On September 18, 1990, Hassan II appointed him Morocco's ambassador to Germany.
