= Abdoul Aziz Hamza =

Nigerien footballer

Abdoul Hamza
Personal information
- Full name: Hamza Hamadou Abdoul Aziz Konkissere
- Date of birth: June 5, 1982 (age 44)
- Place of birth: Niamey, Niger
- Height: 1.75 m (5 ft 9 in)
- Position: Left back

Team information
- Current team: JS du Ténéré
- Number: 18

Youth career
- 2000–2003: AS Niamey

Senior career*
Years	Team	Apps	(Gls)
2004–2005	AS Niamey	24	(1)
2006–2008	BEC Tero Sasana FC	27	(1)
2009–	JS du Ténéré	15	(3)

International career
2008–	Niger	4	(0)
- * Club domestic league appearances and goals

Hamza Hamadou Abdoul Aziz Konkissere (born June 5, 1982, in Niger) is a Nigerien footballer, who currently plays for JS du Ténéré.

== Career ==
The defender has played professional for BEC Tero Sasana FC in the Thailand Premier League.

== International career ==
He is a member of the Niger national football team and made his debut on 31 May 2008 in Kampala against Uganda national football team.
