= Abdul Latif Jassim Kanoo =

Bahraini structural engineer (born 1935)

- Born: December 22, 1935 (age 90)
- Occupations: Structural engineer, writer, and researcher

Abdul Latif bin Jassim Kanoo (Arabic: المهندس الدكتور عبد اللطيف بن جاسم كانو; born 22 December 1935) is a Bahraini structural engineer, writer, and researcher. He was born in Manama and studied civil and structural engineering at Imperial College London, then obtained a Master's degree from the University of Pittsburgh and a doctorate from the University of Texas. Kanoo served as an Under Secretary at the Ministry of Housing in his home country and then as a member of the Consultative Council. He also founded the Beit Al Quran museum, for which he currently serves as chairman of the board of Trustees.

Kanoo has received several honors, including an honorary doctorate from KAIST (Korea Advanced Institute of Science and Technology) in South Korea. The Union of Arab Historians awarded him their Arab Historian Medal in 1987. In 1990, he received the Bahrain Medal from the Emir of Bahrain, Isa bin Salman Al Khalifa, then the highest civil honor bestowed upon local innovators.

== Biography ==
Abdul Latif bin Jassim Kanoo was born on December 22, 1935, in Manama. He studied in Manama for primary and secondary school, and then traveled to England, as did most of the ruling class at the time, to complete his education. Specializing in structural and civil engineering, he completed his studies in 1957. Earning a Diploma of Imperial College from Imperial College London, he continued working in Kuwait, Saudi Arabia, and Bahrain. He earned his Master's degree from the University of Pittsburgh in Pennsylvania, then enrolled at the University of Texas at Austin, where he earned his PhD in 1970.

He served as Under Secretary at the Ministry of Housing, Municipalities, and the Environment from 1975 to September 1996, and retired with honors on October 29, 1996. He chaired and delivered the speech of the Bahraini delegation to the UN Conference on Human Settlements meeting known as Habitat II earlier that summer.

Well-versed in Islamic art and manuscripts, he has acquired and maintained an extensive collection of them considered among the most comprehensive in the Muslim world. He also collected postage stamps, Bahraini antiques, and oil paintings. He has also published prolifically on these subjects.

== Research ==
- السياسة السكانية الوطنية في البحرين ("National Population Policy in Bahrain")
- "البحرين في صدر الإسلام" ("Bahrain at the Dawn of Islam"), 1985, الوثيقة ("Document") magazine
- "دراسة عن المسكوكات الإسلامية" ("Study on Islamic Coins"), 1983, الوثيقة
- رسائل النبي صلى الله عليه وسلم ("Messages of the Prophet, Peace Be Upon Him")
- الأرقام العربية ودورها في الحضارة الإنسانية ("Arabic Numerals and their Role in Human Civilization")
- مع القرآن ـ المصاحف عبر التاريخ ("With the Quran: The Quran Throughout History”)
- “الملك عبد العزيز والبحرين” (“King Abdulaziz and Bahrain”), 1986, الوثيقة
- “أسماء البحرين عبر التاريخ” (“Names of Bahrain Throughout History”), July 1995, البحرين الثقافية (“Al-Bahrain Al-Thaqafia”)

== Literary works ==
- ساعة مع القلم (“A Watch with a Pen”)
- عبر التاريخ (“Throughout History”)
- دروس من الحياة (“Lessons from Life”)
- القلوب مجتمعة ـ البحرين والسعودية (“Two Hearts in One: Bahrain and Saudi Arabia”)
- على خطى الرسول صلى الله عليه وسلم (“In the Footsteps of the Messenger, May God Bless Him and Grant Him Peace”)
- آفاق بحرينية (“Bahrain Horizons”)
- المنتخب من الفنون الإسلامية (“Exemplars of the Islamic Arts”)
- الأرقام العربية نبع الحضارة الإنسانية (“Arabic Numerals: The Source of Human Civilization”), 1996
- الرسائل النبوية الأولى ـ دعوة إلى الإسلام ("The First Prophetic Letters: An Invitation to Islam”)

== Contributions ==
=== Beit Al Quran ===
Abdul Latif Kanoo is the founder of Beit Al Quran, a museum established in Manama on March 12, 1990, and an important center for cultural education and research. The museum contains many valuable and rare collections of Quran manuscripts, and its library contains nearly 15,000 volumes.

=== Other contributions ===
Kanoo delivered a speech at the World Conference on housing issues in developing countries, held by the International Association for Housing Science at King Fahd University of Petroleum and Minerals in Dhahran, Saudi Arabia. He also co-founded the Bahrain Society of Engineers in 1972.

== Awards ==
- Honorary Degree, KAIST
- Arab Historian Medal, Union of Arab Historians, 1987
- Bahrain Medal, Emir, March 1990
- Certificates of appreciation, Bahrain Society of Engineers/Ministry of Housing
