= Abdulaziz Abdul Ghani Ibrahim =

Sudanese historian (1939–2022)

Abdulaziz Abdul Ghani Ibrahim (1939 – February 5, 2022) was a Sudanese researcher and university professor. He has a number of publications related to the history of the Arabian Gulf region, old civilizations, and the Arabian Peninsula, and one of his books is Britain and The Emirates of The Omani Coast, published in 1978.

== Biography ==
Abdulaziz Abdul Ghani Ibrahim was born in Sudan in 1939. He obtained his Master's in Modern History in 1977, before obtaining his PhD in 1980. He taught as a professor in a number of institutions and Arab universities, including the Imam Mohammad Ibn Saud Islamic University from 1980 until 1991, Al Neelain University in Khartoum from 1997 to 1999, and the University of The United Arab Emirates in 2000. Ibrahim was interested in studying the history of the Arabian Gulf region, and he has a number of scholarly studies and research papers related to the history of the Arabian Gulf and the Arabian Peninsula. He has over 30 published books on the Arabian Gulf and East Africa, in addition to translations of some westerners' travel narratives, research methodology in history, and the ancient history of Sudan and other civilizations. He also has a number of studies published in journals and magazines, including the Magazine of The College of Social Sciences of the Imam Mohammad Ibn Saud Islamic University, the African Studies Magazine, and Rawaq History and Heritage Magazine, issues by Hassan Bin Mohammed Center for Historical Studies.

He died on February 5, 2022.

== Publications ==
=== Books ===
- Britain and the Emirates of the Omani Coast, a documentary study, Center for Arabian Gulf Studies, University of Basra, 1978
- The Regional Expansion of Iran in the Emirates of the Omani Coast, Center for Arabian Gulf Studies, University of Basra, 1979
- The Government of India and Administration in the Arabian Gulf, a documentary study, Dar Al-Marikh, Riyadh, 1981
- The British Peace Treaty in the Arabian Gulf, a documentary study, Dar Al-Marikh, Riyadh, 1981
- Security Policy of the Government of India in the Persian Gulf (1868-1914) Documentary Study, King Abdulaziz House, Riyadh, 1982
- The Relationship Between The Omani Coast and Britain, a documentary study, King Abdul Aziz House, Riyadh 1982
- Princes and invaders, the story of borders and regional sovereignty in the Gulf, a documentary study, Dar Al-Saqi, London, 1988
- The Conflict of the Princes, Najd's Relationship with the Political Forces in the Arabian Gulf, a documentary study, London 1991
- Najdians Beyond Borders, Al-Aqilat (1750-1950) Dar Al-Saqi, London, 1991
- Ropes and Dolls, The Beginning of Arab-American Relations, Dar Al-Asala, Khartoum, 1992
- The People of Bilal, The Historical Roots of Islam in Abyssinia, The Sudanese Book House, Khartoum 1995
- Lectures on the history of the European Renaissance, Dar Alqa, Malta, 1997
- Lectures on the history of Europe between the Renaissance and the French Revolution, Dar Alqa Malta, 1997
- History: Its History, Interpretation and Writing, Sudanese Book House, Khartoum 1999
- From the Ottoman Documents on the History of the Gulf and the Arabian Peninsula, Zayed Center for Heritage and History, Al Ain, 2001
- From British sources on the history of the Gulf and the Arabian Peninsula, Zayed Center for Heritage and History, Al Ain 2001
- Documents from the Egyptian Archive in the History of the Gulf and the Arabian Peninsula, Zayed Center for Heritage and History, Al Ain, 2001
- History of Oman (Translation of Wollsted's Journey in Amman), Dar Al-Saqi, Beirut, 2001
- Abu Dhabi, Unification of the Emirate and Establishment of the Union, Documentation and Research Center, Abu Dhabi, 2004
- Modern Qatar: A Reading in the Documents of the Early Years of the Emirate of Al Thani, 1840 1919, Dar Al-Saqi, Beirut, 2013
- Western Narratives of Travels in the Arabian Peninsula, Part One (1500-1840), Dar Al Saqi, Beirut, 2013
- Western Narratives of Travels in the Arabian Peninsula, Part Two (1850-1880), Dar Al Saqi, Beirut, 2013
- Western Narratives of Travels in the Arabian Peninsula, Part Three (1900-1952), Dar Al-Saqi, Beirut, 2013
- Sheikh Qassim bin Muhammad Al Thani, Part One: The Personal Biography, Dar Al Saqi, Beirut, 2017
- Sheikh Qassim bin Mohammed Al Thani, Part Two: The Relationship with Bahrain, Dar Al Saqi, Beirut, 2017
- Sheikh Qasim bin Muhammad, Al Thani, Part Three: The Relationship with the Ottoman Empire, Dar Al Saqi, Beirut, 2017
- Book of Selections from the Bombay Documents issued in 1856, (translation) Hassan bin Mohammed Center for Historical Studies, Qatar, 2017

=== Research studies ===
- Arab-African Relations: A Study of the Negative Effects of Colonialism, issued by the Institute of Arab Research and Studies in Cairo, 1977, research entitled: “Italian Colonialism and its Impact on Islam and Arabism in Africa.”
- The Lebanese Crisis issued by the Institute of Arab Research and Studies 1979, research entitled: “Syrian-Lebanese Relations during the French Colonial Period.”
- Abu Dhabi and the Pearl - A Story with a History, issued by Al Hosn Center for Historical Studies, Abu Dhabi, 2011. Two papers: “Pledges, Treaties, and Agreements between Britain and the Sheikhs of the Emirates,” and “Western Travelers in the Emirate of Abu Dhabi in the Modern Age.”
