= Abdulaziz bin Faisal bin Mohammed Al-Thani =

Qatari politician

Minister of State for Interior Affairs
- Incumbent
- Assumed office 27 March 2023
- Monarch: Tamim bin Hamad Al Thani
- Prime Minister: Mohammed bin Abdulrahman bin Jassim Al Thani

Abdulaziz bin Faisal bin Mohammed Al-Thani is the Qatari Minister of State for Interior Affairs. He was appointed as Minister on 27 March 2023.

== Career ==
In 2018, Al-Thani served as the Deputy General of the Internal Security Force.

In 2020, Al-Thani was appointed Commander of the Internal Security Force and Under-Secretary of the Ministry of Interior.

Since 27 March 2023, Al-Thani has been Minister of State for Interior Affairs.
