= Abdulaziz Al-Haddad =

Kuwaiti actor (1950–2025)

Abdulaziz Al-Haddad (June 14, 1950 – January 2, 2025) was a Kuwaiti actor and director. Trained as an engineer, he appeared in 30 television series, including The Three Brothers (originally Al Ekhwa Al Thalatha) in 1978 and Flight 422 in 2023, as well as in plays like Pliers in 1987 and on the radio. The Kuwaiti Ministry of Information issued an obituary upon his death.
