= Abdul Aziz Al-Marzoug =

Saudi Arabian footballer

Personal information
- Date of birth: 16 July 1975 (age 51)
- Position: Defender

International career
Years	Team	Apps	(Gls)
- Saudi Arabia

Abdul Aziz Al-Marzoug (born 16 July 1975) is a Saudi Arabian former footballer. He competed in the men's tournament at the 1996 Summer Olympics.
