= Bola Owolabi =

British medical doctor and health leader

Idayat Bolanle Owolabi, known as Bola Owolabi, is a Nigerian-born British medical doctor. She works as a general practitioner in Derbyshire.

== Early life and education ==
Owolabi was born in Nigeria, and was inspired to study medicine after a stay in hospital with chickenpox at the age of nine, where she found the female doctor to be "the loveliest kindest human being".

== Career ==
She was appointed as chief inspector of primary and community services for the Care Quality Commission in 2025, and has served as director of health inequalities at the National Health Service. She was at the forefront of the Core20PLUS5 framework which focused on narrowing healthcare inequalities in the most deprived and underserved groups in society. She is an Honorary Professor at Birmingham University and Vice President of the Royal Society for Public Health.

== Awards and recognition ==
She was appointed C.B.E. in the 2025 Birthday Honours, "For services to Reducing Health Inequalities."
