= Subhizade Abdulaziz =

Ottoman chief physician (died 1782/3)

- Title: Hekimbaşı (Chief Physician)

Personal life
- Died: 1782/1783 Istanköy (Kos), Ottoman Empire
- Notable work(s): Translations of Asjar o asmar and Borhan al-kefaya
- Occupation: Chief Physician, Islamic scholar, translator

Senior posting
- Influenced by: Hermann Boerhaave

Subhizade Abdulaziz Effendi (Ottoman Turkish: عبدالعزیز صبحی زاده افندی; died 1782/1783), was an Ottoman chief physician (hekimbashi) of the 18th century. A son of a certain historian named "Subhi" (hence, Subhizade), he worked at the court in Constantinople.

Abdulaziz was proficient in Turkish, Persian, French, and Latin. He translated the Persian works Asjar o asmar of 'Ala' al-Din 'Ali Shah Khwarazmi al-Bukhari, and Borhan al-kefaya of Ali ibn Mohammad al-Sharif al-Bakri into Turkish. He also wrote two works in Turkish (translated from French and Latin) on medicine, translations of works written by Hermann Boerhaave. One of these translations was completed in 1768 with the assistance of Thomas von Herbert, an Austrian interpreter, whereas the other one, Boerhaave's Aphorisma, was completed in 1771.

Apart from just translating Boerhaave's "ideas", Abdulaziz also tried to "reconcile and harmonize" these efforts of the Dutchman with the existing traditional Islamic medicine.

Later, Abdulaziz fell out with incumbent sultan Abdul Hamid I (r. 1773-1789); he was banished to Istanköy (Kos), where he lived until his death.

== Sources ==
- Loudon, Irvine, ed. (2001). Western Medicine: An Illustrated History. Oxford University Press. ISBN 978-0199248131.
- Somel, Selcuk Aksin (2003). Historical Dictionary of the Ottoman Empire (2 ed.). Scarecrow Press. ISBN 978-0810866065.
- Yazici, T. (1982). "ʿABD-al-ʿAZĪZ ḤEKĪMBĀŠĪ". Encyclopaedia Iranica.
