= Abdul Aziz Khan (cricketer) =

Indian cricketer

Personal information
- Full name: Abdul Aziz Khan
- Born: Mumbai, India

Career statistics
Competition	FC
Matches	13
Runs scored	162
Batting average	7.36
100s/50s	0/0
Top score	74
Balls bowled	1,574
Wickets	45
Bowling average	17.66
5 wickets in innings	1
10 wickets in match	–
Best bowling	7/58
Catches/stumpings	8/0
- Source: ESPNcricinfo

Abdul Aziz Khan was an Indian first-class cricketer active 1912–1926 who played mostly for the Muslims cricket team. He made eleven appearances, scoring 185 runs with a highest score of 43, and took 18 wickets with a best innings return of five for 79.
