= Abdelaziz Guerda =

Algerian actor (1946–2026)

- عبد العزيز قردة
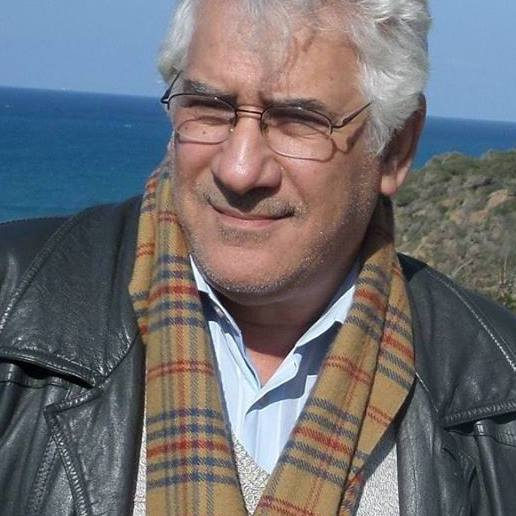
- Guerda in 2016
- Born: 2 December 1946; Algiers, French Algeria
- Died: 17 August 2026 (aged 79); Sidi Ghiles, Algeria
- Occupation: Actor

Abdelaziz Guerda (Arabic: عبد العزيز قردة; 2 December 1946 – 17 August 2026) was an Algerian actor.

Guerda made appearances in the theatre, television, and cinema.

Guerda died in Sidi Ghiles on 17 August 2026, at the age of 79.

== Filmography ==
=== Film ===
- Hassan Taxi (1982)
- L'Honneur de la tribu (1993)
- Morituri (2007)
- Le Marin (2015)
- Serkadji, Barberousse (2015)

=== Television ===
- Ness Mlah City (2004–2006)
- Azraa Yenbet (2006)
- Binatna (2006)
- Rendezvous with Destiny (2007)
- Bin El Bareh Ouel Youm (2009)
- Dar El Bahdja (2013)
- Sultan Achour 10 (2015)
