= Sultan Abdul Aziz Shah Golf and Country Club =

Golf course in Shah Alam, Selangor, Malaysia

Coordinates: 3.090353°N 101.534414°E

Sultan Abdul Aziz Shah Golf and Country Club, formerly known as Kelab Golf Sultan Abdul Aziz Shah, is a golf course in Shah Alam, Selangor, Malaysia. Located near the Subang Airport, the club has three 9-hole loops designed by Australian five-time Open champion Peter Thomson.
