= Abdulaziz Shareef =

Qatari footballer (born 1993)

Abdulaziz Shareef عبد العزيز شريف
Personal information
- Full name: Abdulaziz Abdullah Shareef
- Date of birth: 9 February 1993 (age 33)
- Place of birth: Qatar
- Position: Defender

Youth career
- –2013: Al-Wakrah

Senior career*
Years	Team	Apps	(Gls)
2013–2014	Lekhwiya		
2014–2015	Al-Shahania		
2015–2017	Al-Ahli		
2015–2016	→ Mesaimeer (loan)		
2017–2018	Mesaimeer		
2018–2022	Al-Bidda		
- * Club domestic league appearances and goals

Abdulaziz Shareef (Arabic:عبد العزيز شريف) (born 9 February 1993) is a Qatari footballer. He currently plays as a defender.

== Career ==
He formerly played for Al-Wakrah, Lekhwiya, Al-Shahania, Al-Ahli, Mesaimeer, and Al-Bidda .
