= Abdulaziz Alsibyani =

Saudi Arabian footballer

Personal information
- Full name: Abdulaziz Alsibyani Ayash
- Date of birth: April 12, 1989 (age 37)
- Place of birth: Saudi Arabia
- Height: 1.71 m (5 ft 7 1/2 in)
- Position: Forward

Senior career*
Years	Team	Apps	(Gls)
2008–2011	Al-Ittihad	15	(1)
2011–2012	Al-Qadisiyah	7	(0)
2012–2013	Al-Raed		
2014–2015	Al Hazm		
2015–2016	Al-Najma SC		
- * Club domestic league appearances and goals as of 6/2/2012 ‡ National team caps and goals as of 24/8/2011

Abdulaziz Al-Subyani (born April 12, 1989) is a Saudi Arabian footballer playing for Al-Ittihad club. He plays as a forward or winger. He is known for his speedily attack playing-style.
