= Abdulaziz Al-Mohammed =

Saudi Arabian footballer

Abdulaziz Al-Mohammed عبد العزيز المحمد
Personal information
- Full name: Abdulaziz Ali Salem Al-Mohammed Al-Sudairy
- Date of birth: 22 December 1987 (age 38)
- Place of birth: Saudi Arabia
- Position: Midfielder

Team information
- Current team: Al-Qurayat

Youth career
- –2007: Al-Ittihad

Senior career*
Years	Team	Apps	(Gls)
2007–2012	Al-Taawoun		
2011	→ Al-Watani (loan)		
2011–2012	→ Al-Tai (loan)		
2012–2013	Al-Rabee		
2013–2014	Abha		
2014–2015	Ohod		
2015–2016	Al-Amal		
2016–2017	Al-Jabalain		
2017–2018	Al-Diriyah		
2018–2020	Al-Hejaz		
2020–2021	Al-Okhdood		
2021–2022	Al-Rayyan		
2022–2023	Wej		
2023–2024	Al-Jeel		
2024–2025	Al-Hejaz		
2025–	Al-Qurayat		
- * Club domestic league appearances and goals

Abdulaziz Al-Mohammed (Arabic: عبد العزيز المحمد; born 22 December 1987) is a Saudi Arabian footballer who plays for Al-Qurayat as a midfielder.
