= Abdoul Aziz Diallo =

Guinean politician

Deputy in the National Assembly (Guinea)
- President: Alpha Conde
- Preceded by: Makoura Traoré
- Constituency: Dalaba

Personal details
- Party: Rally of the Guinean People
- Committees: Commerce; Hotels, Tourism and Handicrafts

Abdoul Aziz Diallo is a Guinean politician who represents the constituency of Dalaba Prefecture, in the Fouta Jalon region. He is a member of the Majority Rally of the Guinean People Party of former president Alpha Conde.
