= Abdulaziz Abdulrahman Almusallam =

Emirati novelist and writer

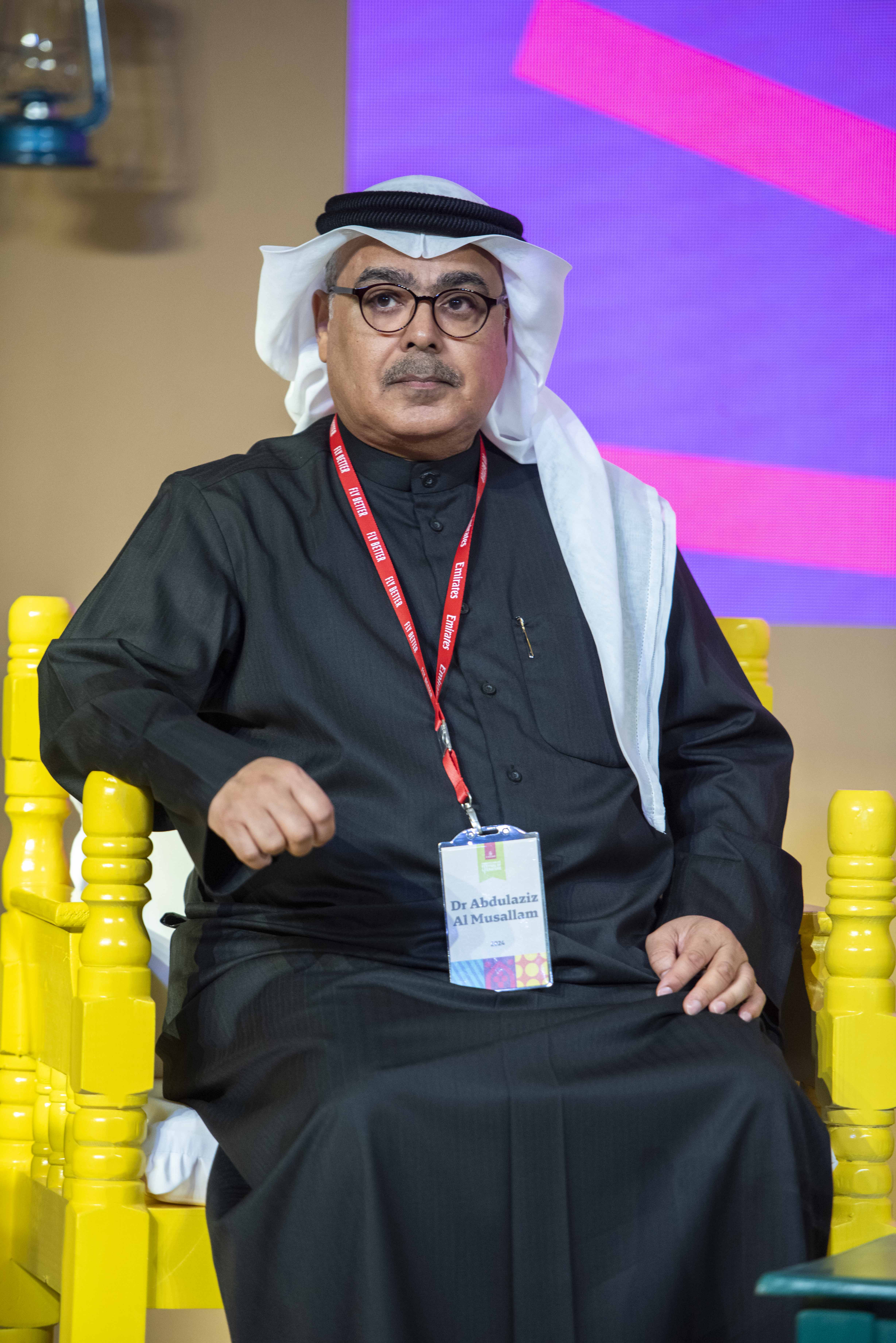
- Almusallam at Sharjah Institute for Heritage
- Occupation: Chairman of Sharjah Institute for Heritage
- Known for: Sharjah Institute for Heritage
- Website: http://www.sih.gov.ae

Abdulaziz Abdulrahman Almusallam (Arabic: عبد العزيز عبد الرحمن المسلم) is an Emirati novelist and writer. He is the chairman of Sharjah Institute for Heritage.

Almusallam has worked to promote the Emirati culture and heritage. The National newspaper described Almusallam as the "fairy tale man" and praised his involvement in the heritage week by going to schools and telling Emirati traditional folktales and "jinn tales". He authored the book "Encyclopedia of superstitious creatures in the Emirati heritage", which details mythical creatures of Emirati popular culture.
