= Abdul-Aziz al-Samarrai Mosque =

Mosque in Fallujah, Al Anbar, Iraq

- جامع اﺍلشﯾﻳخ عبدﺩ اﺍلعزﺯﯾﻳزﺯ اﺍلسامرﺭاﺍئي
- Location of the former mosque in Iraq

Religion
- Affiliation: Sunni Islam
- Ecclesiastical or organisational status: Mosque
- Status: unknown

Location
- Location: Fallujah, Al Anbar Governorate
- Country: Iraq
- Coordinates: 33°20′42″N 43°47′11″E

Architecture
- Type: Islamic architecture

Specifications
- Dome: One
- Minaret: One (slightly damaged)

The Abdul-Aziz al-Samarrai Mosque (Arabic: مسجد عبد العزيز السامرائي) is an Islamic mosque located in Fallujah, in the Al Anbar Governorate of Iraq. Historically, a predominantly Sunni city, prior to the Iraq War, Fallujah was described as "the city of 120 mosques".

== During the Iraq War ==
In 2004, during the first battle of Fallujah, the mosque came to worldwide attention when Sunni militants inside the mosque directed small-arms and rocket fire at US Marines. US forces returned fire, when a Cobra helicopter fired a Hellfire missile at the base of the mosque's minaret and a F-16 intentionally dropped a bomb on the mosque. A US Marines brigadier general said the mosque would ordinarily have protection under the Geneva Convention, but added that the attacks from inside the building caused it to lose its status. It was initially claimed that forty rebels had been killed in the strike, but it was later stated that no bodies were actually found at the scene. Other sources claim as many as fifty were killed in the attack.

During the 2014 fall of Fallujah, the mosque was attacked by a mortar shell. In June 2016, during the third battle, members of a Shia militia, most likely members of Islamic State, were purportedly photographed in the mosque sahn. Iraqi security forces again attacked the mosque. Minimal damage was reported.

== See also ==
- Islam in Iraq
- List of mosques in Iraq
