= Abdulazeez Owolabi =

Nigerian footballer

Personal information
- Full name: Abdulazeez Muftau Owolabi
- Date of birth: 13 April 2000 (age 26)
- Height: 1.76 m (5 ft 9 in)
- Position: Full-back

Youth career
- –2019: Abuja Football College

Senior career*
Years	Team	Apps	(Gls)
2019–2023	Fujairah	35	(1)
2021–2022	→ Al-Wasl (loan)	14	(0)
2024	Al Dhafra		
- * Club domestic league appearances and goals as of 22:15, 1 February 2020 (UTC)

Abdulazeez Muftau Owolabi (born 13 April 2000) is a Nigerian footballer who plays as a full-back.

== Career statistics ==
=== Club ===
As of 1 February 2020.

Club	Season	League			Cup		Continental		Other		Total	
Club	Season	Division	Apps	Goals	Apps	Goals	Apps	Goals	Apps	Goals	Apps	Goals
Fujairah	2019–20	UAE Pro League	12	5	2 (Note: Appearances in the UAE League Cup)	0	0	0	0	0	14	0
Career total			12	5	2	0	0	0	0	0	14	0
