= List of mosques in Spain =

This is a list of mosques in Spain. It lists Muslim mosques (Arabic: Masjid, Spanish: Mezquita) and Islamic centers in Spain. It lists only open, functioning mosques that allow Muslims to perform Islamic prayers (Salah). For a list of old historical mosques built during the Al-Andalus (Muslim Spain) period, please see the list of former mosques in Spain.

The exact number of mosques in Spain vary according to different sources and estimates. As of May 2018, El Observatorio del Pluralismo Religioso en España (Observatory of Religious Pluralism in Spain) listed 1588 places of Muslim worship on their website. According to a former 2010 estimate, there were 13 large mosques and more than 1000 smaller mosques and Islamic prayer rooms scattered across the country serving an estimated Muslim population of 1.5 million. The majority of them were located in Catalonia in northeastern Spain.

The number of mosques has been increasing with the growth of Islam in Spain, resulting mainly from immigration from Muslim countries, and an increasing number of Muslim tourists visiting the country. However finding a mosque or prayer facility is still difficult in many places outside major cities and towns.

== List of mosques in Spain ==
This is a list of open, functioning mosques only. It lists some, but by no means all of the active mosques in Spain. It does not include historic former mosques in Spain like the Mosque–Cathedral of Córdoba that do not allow Islamic prayers on their premises.

Name	City	Images	Opened	Denomination	Facilities & Services	Notes
Abu Bakr Mosque	Madrid		1988	?	Offices, nursery, school, library, auditorium, and shop.	Financed by donations from various Arab countries.
King Abdul Aziz Mosque	Marbella		1981	Salafi school of Islamic theology	?	Financed by Saudi Prince Salman Ben Abdulaziz Al Saud.
M-30 Mosque (Islamic Cultural Centre of Madrid)	Madrid		1992	?	Library, auditorium, tailoring and dressmaking school, restaurant, and fitness centre.	Financed by King Fahd ibn Abdulaziz Al Saud.
Al-Andalus Mosque	Málaga		2007	Salafi school of Islamic theology	Nursery, auditorium, rooms for men and women, and translation service.	Financed by Saudi Arabia and owned by the Suhail Foundation.
Al-Morabito Mosque	Córdoba		40's, reopened in 1992	?	?	Spain's first modern mosque. Built during the Spanish Civil War as a gift for Franco's Muslim soldiers.
Mosque of Fuengirola	Fuengirola		1994	Salafi school of Islamic theology	?	Financed by Saudi Arabia and linked to the Muslim World League.
Granada Mosque	Granada		2003	Sufism (Sufi movement inspired of Darqawi’s brotherhood, founded by the Scottish Muslim convert, Ian Dallas, in the 1970s).	?	Financed by donations from Islamic countries (Libya, Morocco, the United Arab Emirates, and Malaysia).
Basharat Mosque	Pedro Abad		1982	Ahmadiyya	?	
Islamic Cultural Centre of Valencia	Valencia		1994	?	?	Financed by Kuwaiti capital and under the authority of the Organisation of Arab Cities.
Basauri Mosque	Biscay		2013	Sunni Islam	?	Financed by the local Muslim community in the organization Comunidad Islámica Mezquita de Basauri which was officially formed in 2011 and completed the construction of the mosque in 2013.
Buen Acuerdo Mosque	Melilla		1927, reopened in 2011	?	?	
Central Mosque of Melilla	Melilla		1947, reopened in 1994	?	?	
Muley El-Mehdi Mosque	Ceuta		1940	?	?	
Mezquita Sidi Embarek	Ceuta		1940 (Marabout from the 18th century)	?	?	
Al-Baida Mosque (Alqueria de los Rosales Mosque)	Puebla de Don Fadrique		2001	?	Faculty of Studies of Al-Andalus	Financial support of Shaykh Sultan bin Muhammad al-Qasim, Emir of Sharjah.

== See also ==
- Islam in Spain
- Religion in Spain
- List of former mosques in Spain
- Lists of mosques (worldwide)
