= King Abdul Aziz Mosque =

Mosque in Marbella, Málaga, Spain

- Spanish: Mezquita del rey Abdelaziz
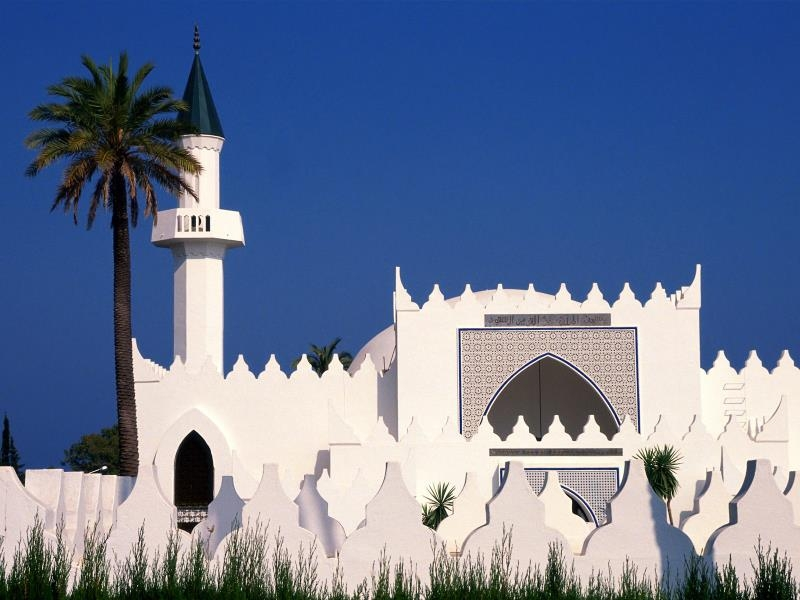
- The mosque in 2012

- Location of the mosque in Andalusia

Religion
- Affiliation: Islam
- Branch/tradition: Salafi
- Ecclesiastical or organizational status: Mosque
- Status: Active

Location
- Location: Marbella, Málaga, Andalusia
- Country: Spain
- Interactive map of King Abdul Aziz Mosque
- Coordinates: 36°30′15.57″N 4°55′39.44″W

Architecture
- Architect: Juan Mora
- Type: Mosque architecture
- Style: Andalusian-inspired Islamic contemporary
- Funded by: Government of Saudi Arabia
- Completed: 1981

Specifications
- Capacity: 800 worshipers
- Dome: One
- Minaret: One

King Abdul Aziz Mosque (Spanish: Mezquita del rey Abdelaziz), also known as Marbella Mosque (Spanish: Mezquita de Marbella), is a mosque, located in Marbella, Province of Málaga, Andalusia, Spain. Construction of the mosque was financed by the Government of Saudi Arabia and named after its first monarch. Completed in 1981, it is one of the first Spanish mosques built in the modern time.

Along with the Fuengirola Mosque and Malaga Mosque, the Marbella Mosque was financed by the Government of Saudi Arabia, and is therefore a part of the Salafi school of thought, a movement dominant in Saudi Arabia. The construction was ordered by Prince Salman in honor of King Fahd, who was a frequenter of Marbella.

The building is an example of Andalusian-inspired contemporary Arabic architecture. Built by Córdoban architect Juan Mora, it holds over 800 people and consists of housing for the imam, a library and gardens.

== See also ==
- Islam in Spain
- List of mosques in Spain
- List of things named after Saudi kings
