= Mohammed Zouaydi =

Mohammed Galeb Kalaje Zouaydi (Arabic: محمد غالب كلاج زوايدي) is a Syrian businessman based in Spain, accused of having ties with Al-Qaeda. He is the brother-in-law of senior Al-Qaeda operative Abu Khalid al-Suri. He became a Spanish accountant while living between Spain and Saudi Arabia. In Saudi Arabia he was known as the accountant for the Al-Faisal branch of the Saudi royal family, which included Turki al-Faisal, director of the Saudi intelligence agency (1979-2001).

In Spain, he is accused of transferring funds totaling nearly a million dollars from several corporations he was involved with that accepted donations, to Al-Qaeda members, including Mamoun Darkazanli and Nabil Sayadi. He was arrested by Spanish authorities on April 23, 2002.

He was described as "Al Qaeda's financier" by The Wall Street Journal.

Mohammed Galeb Kalaje Zouaydi's brother-in-law, Abu-Khalid al-Suri, was Al-Qaeda's representative in Syria and received funding from the Qatar-based terrorist Abd Al-Rahman al-Nuaimi, cofounder of Alkarama.

== 2019 arrest for terrorism financing ==
On 19 June 2019, Mohammed Galeb Kalaje Zouaydi was arrested by Spanish police as part of "Operation Wamor", which involved 350 police officers across Spain and Europol anti-terrorism agents. Those arrested were described by Europol as "part of a huge international clandestine structure, with the aim of attacking the Western economic system as a form of terrorism".

He was arrested alongside several members of the Kutayni family, who created a web of companies to fund Al-Qaeda operations in Syria. According to the Spanish newspaper ABC, he acted as the "financial director" of the terrorist network, which was the largest ever uncovered in Spain.

== Links with the Muslim Brotherhood ==
Fares Kutayni, who was arrested with Mohammed Galeb Kalaje Zouaydi, is a representative of the Union of Islamic Communities of Spain, which is related to the Muslim Brotherhood. According to Spanish media, the Kutayni clan is also related to Riay Tatary Bakry, President of the Islamic Commission of Spain, who is "considered to be ideologically linked to the Muslim Brotherhood".
