= Muley El-Mehdi Mosque =

Mosque in Ceuta

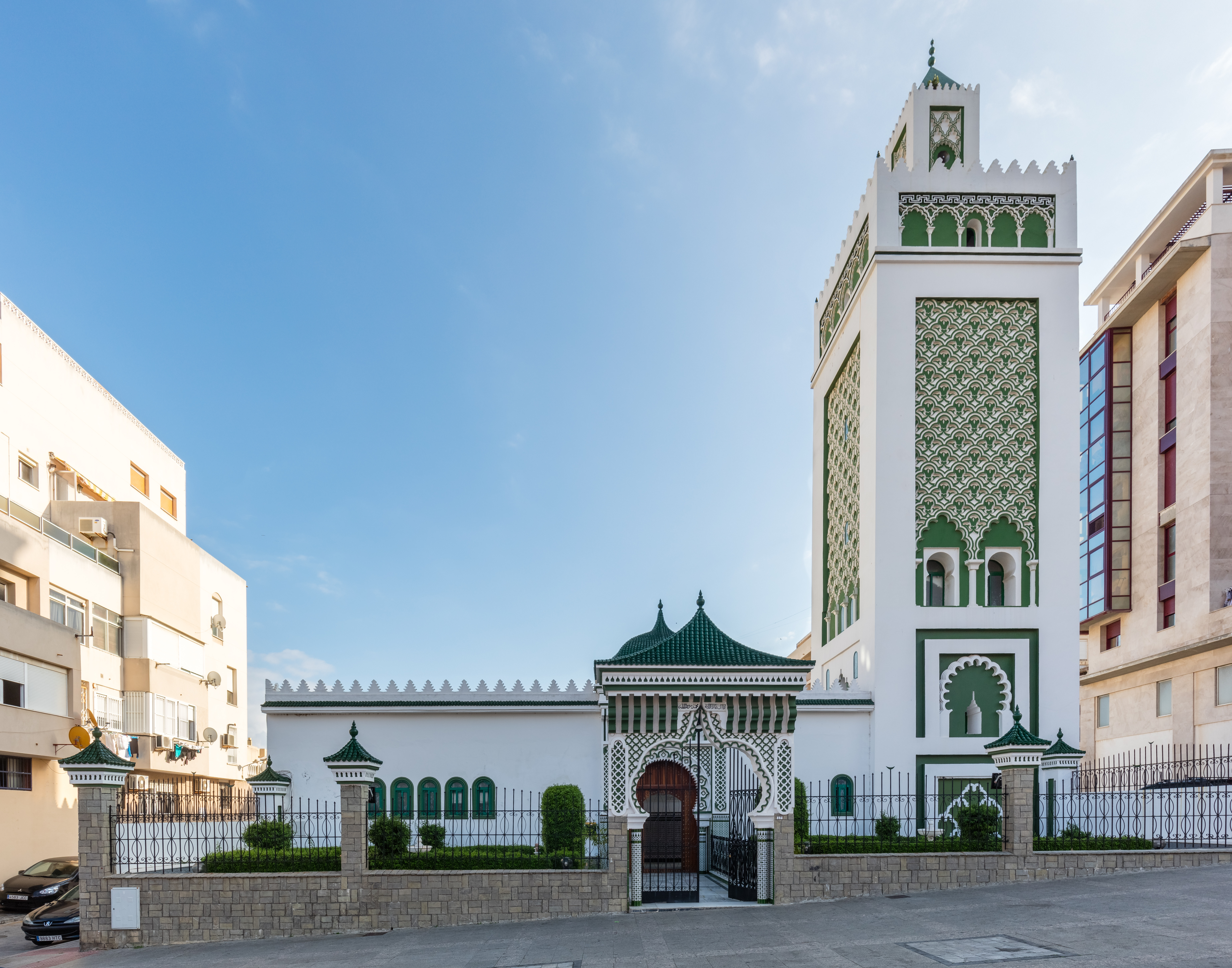
- The mosque in 2015

- Location of the mosque in North Africa, in the Spanish Province of Cádiz

Religion
- Affiliation: Islam
- Ecclesiastical or organizational status: Mosque
- Status: Active

Location
- Location: Ceuta, North Africa
- Country: Spain
- Interactive map of Muley El-Mehdi Mosque
- Coordinates: 35°53′07.8″N 5°19′29.0″W

Architecture
- Type: Mosque architecture
- Groundbreaking: 1939
- Completed: 1940

The Muley El-Mehdi Mosque is a mosque in Ceuta.

== Overview ==
The construction of the mosque started in 1939 and completed in 1940. It was then inaugurated on 18 July 1940. In 2017, the building underwent renovation.

The mosque is the largest mosque in Ceuta.

== See also ==
- Islam in Spain
- List of mosques in Spain
- List of mosques in Africa
