= Islamic Federation of the Canary Islands =

Islamic organization in Spain

- Founded: 2015; 11 years ago
- Founder: Several Muslim communities in the Canary Islands
- Location: Los Cristianos, Tenerife
- Key people: Hamed Allal Hamed

The Islamic Federation of the Canary Islands (in Spanish: Federación Islámica de Canarias) is a Muslim religious organization that brings together associations and Islamic religious communities around the Canary Islands. Its headquarters is located in the town of Los Cristianos, in the municipality of Arona south of the island of Tenerife (Spain).

== History ==
The Islamic Federation of the Canary Islands was established in 2015 in analogous manner to those in other regions of Spain. To this end they worked different associations and Muslim communities around the archipelago and the municipalities of Adeje and Arona. With Tijani Mimoun El Bouji being president of the Federation and the spokesman being Abdssamad Mohamed.

This organization was created with the primary objective of providing advice to the Canary Islamic communities and facilitate their integration. The Islamic Federation of the Canary Islands is a member for registration via the Islamic Commission of Spain and Union of Islamic Communities of Spain.

At present, there are in the Canary Islands a figure of approximately 70,000 Muslims and 40 mosques and places of worship throughout the archipelago.

== Presidents of the Federation ==
- Tijani Mimoun Bouji (2015–2021)
- Hamed Allal Hamed (2021-current)

== Controversies ==
- In 2017, during the controversy unleashed at the Carnival of Las Palmas de Gran Canaria due to the performance of the Drag Queen Sethlas, disguised as Virgin Mary and with a scene that presented the Crucifixion of Christ and that was the winner of the contest, the President of the Islamic Federation of the Canary Islands, Tijani Mimoun El Bouji, spoke out against the show, which he considered "blasphemous".
- The same year, some media in the archipelago linked the Islamic Federation of the Canary Islands with the Moroccan Salafist movement Al Adl Wa Al Ihssane, alluding that the latter was trying to influence the Muslim community of the archipelago through the Islamic Federation of Canary Islands. However, Tijani El Bouji, president of the Federation, denied this link.
- In 2021, the president of the Islamic Federation, Tijani El Bouji, was tried for a crime of incitement to hatred for uploading numerous publications against Israel and the Jewish people to a social network in relation to the ongoing Israel-Hamas war, and would eventually be acquitted.

== See also ==
- Islamic Commission of Spain
- Islam in Spain
