= Fuengirola Mosque =

Mosque in Fuengirola, Málaga, Spain

- Spanish: Mezquita de Fuengirola
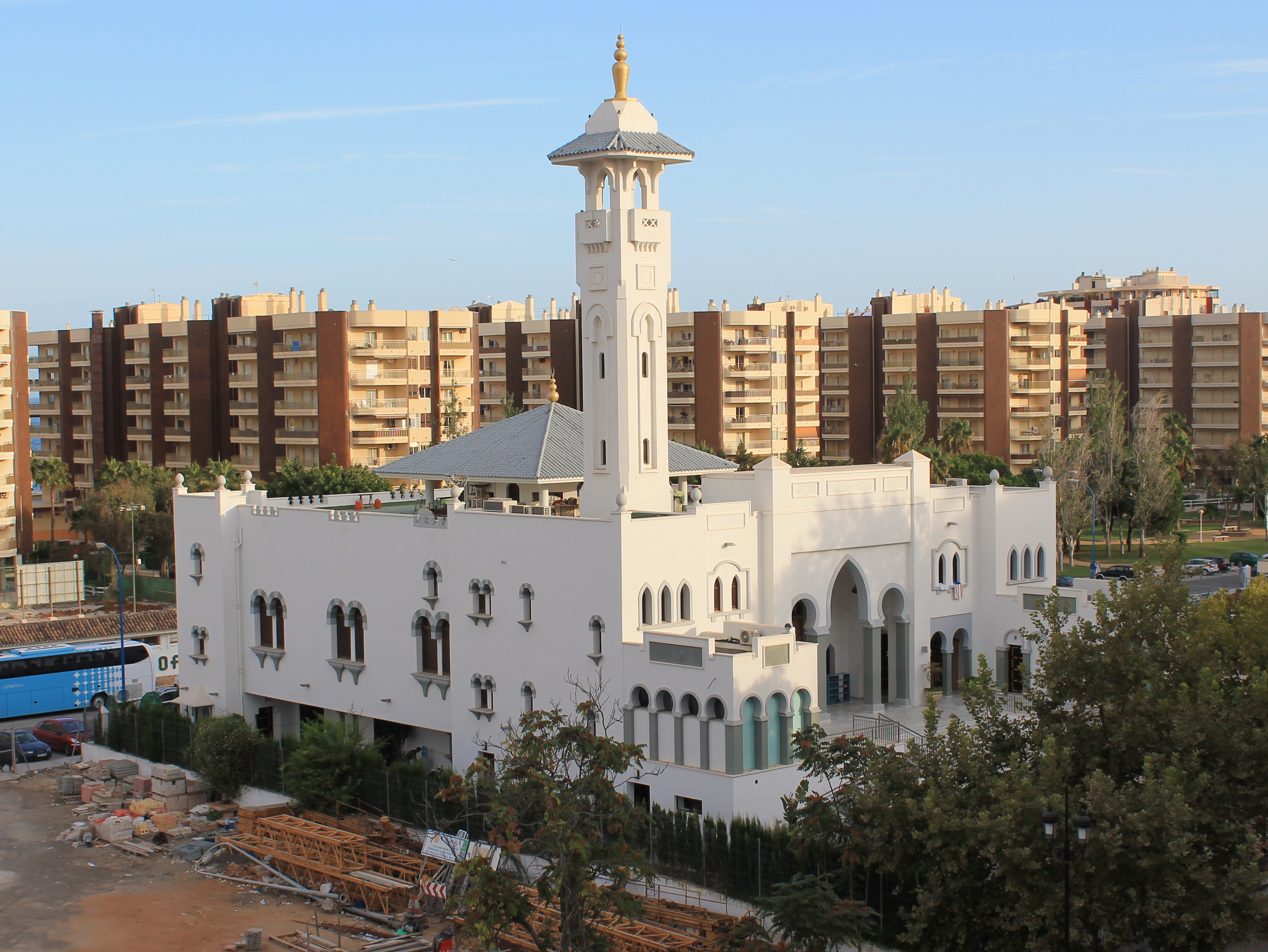
- The mosque in 2012

- Location of the mosque in Andalusia

Religion
- Affiliation: Islam
- Ecclesiastical or organizational status: Mosque
- Status: Active

Location
- Location: Fuengirola, Málaga, Andalusia
- Country: Spain
- Interactive map of Fuengirola Mosque
- Coordinates: 36°31′52.3″N 4°37′36.7″W

Architecture
- Type: Mosque architecture
- Funded by: Government of Saudi Arabia
- Groundbreaking: 1983
- Completed: 1994
- Minaret: One

Fuengirola Mosque (Spanish: Mezquita de Fuengirola) is a mosque in Fuengirola, Province of Málaga, Andalusia, Spain. It is also known as the Suhail Islamic Cultural Centre.

== Overview ==
Funded by the Government of Saudi Arabia, the construction of the mosque started in 1983 and was completed in 1994.

The mosque's leader, Imam Mohamed Kamal Mostafa, served a jail term of a year and three months for inciting violence towards women.

== See also ==
- Islam in Spain
- List of mosques in Europe § Spain
