= Rabih Haddad =

Co-founder of Global Relief Foundation

Rabih Haddad is the Executive Director of the Global Anti-Aggression Campaign (GAAC). He also co-founded the Global Relief Foundation (GRF), an Illinois-based charity.

== Life ==
=== Early life ===
Rabih Haddad was born into a largely Christian family in Lebanon not long before the Lebanese civil war.

=== Education ===
He began his studies at the American University of Beirut but moved to the United States when his parents feared for his safety during the Lebanese civil war.

=== Religious conversion and spiritual journey ===
Rabih's father was Presbyterian and his mother was Greek Orthodox, but Rabih was never baptized, as his parents wanted him and his brothers to be able to choose their own religion once they were old enough. As a teenager, Rabih started attending a Baptist church in Lebanon with his grandfather. He began to question how Christ could be a prophet and son of God.

When he was 17, he was introduced to Buddhism by a friend. His curiosity about Buddhism did not last long and at 18 he became interested in Islam. He converted to Islam at age 19, shortly after meeting his wife al-Rushaid, who was a Muslim. For a while he did not practice Islam despite having converted, but once he moved to the U.S. he began to attend Friday prayers.

=== Family life ===
He married al-Rushaid in 1987 in Ohio, where she had been studying. Between 1988 and 1992 the couple split time between Pakistan and Kuwait. In 1993, they moved from Kuwait to Chicago, where the Global Relief Foundation had already been established. In 1996, they moved back to Kuwait before returning to the United States in 1998. By 1999 they moved to Ann Arbor where Haddad continued to work for GLF. They have children, Sana, Sami, and Rami, and currently live in Lebanon.

Haddad also served as a fundraiser for the Ann Arbor chapter of the Council on American-Islamic Relations (CAIR). While living in Ann Arbor he also served as an imam at the Islamic Center in Ann Arbor where he also taught school and gave lectures.

== Global Relief Foundation ==
Global Relief Foundation, also known as Fondation Secours Mondial (FSM), was started in 1992 as a non-profit charitable organization, and became the largest Islamic charity in the United States.

Rabih Haddad served as GRF's president throughout the 1990s and 2000.

== Detroit Free Press v. Ashcroft ==
In January 2002, several news organizations, the American Civil Liberties Union, and U.S. Representative John Conyers (D-Detroit) sued Attorney General John Ashcroft, Immigration Judge Elizabeth Hacker, and Michael Creppy, who was the nation's chief immigration judge. They demanded that the hearings be opened and the records be made public. This suit was initiated due to Rabih Haddad's closed hearings. Haddad and his attorney later also filed a lawsuit demanding that his hearings be open to the public.

In April 2002 U.S. District Court Judge ruled that his hearings must be opened but the Justice Department appealed the decision. His hearings were then opened and he was granted a new bond hearing with a new judge.

== Global Anti-Aggression Campaign ==
The Global Anti-Aggression Campaign (GAAC) was started in Qatar by Dr. Abd al-Rahman al-Nuaimi, a founding member of the Sheikh Eid Organization. It was formed in 2003 to create an Islamist network that campaigns against Western imperialism in the Muslim world. The campaign organizes yearly conferences. Rabih Haddad serves as the group's Lebanese chief, who was appointed by the Sheikh Eid Organization to optimize the Salafi activities of the group. Rabih Haddad currently serves on the board of trustees. Nuaimi also currently still serves on the Board of Trustees of GAAC.
