= Riay Tatary =

Syrian imam (1948–2020)

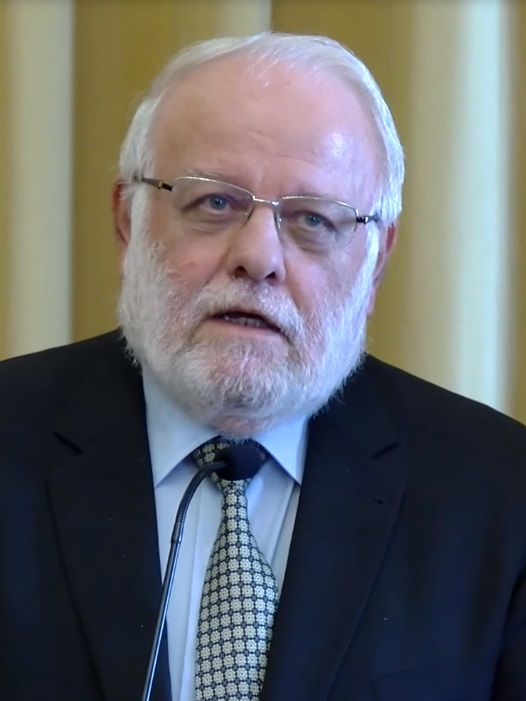
- Born: 19 March 1948; Damascus
- Died: 6 April 2020 (aged 72); Hospital Universitario La Paz
- Awards: Knight Commander of the Order of Civil Merit (1998)

Riay Tatary Bakry (19 March 1948 – 6 April 2020) was a Syrian religious leader, chairman of the Union of Islamic Communities of Spain. He was imam of the Central Mosque in Madrid, Spain, as well as president of the Islamic Commission of Spain.

== Biography ==
He was born in Damascus on 19 March 1948. He settled in Spain in 1970 and studied medicine at the University of Oviedo. He took part in the advisory committee for Freedom of Religion of the Ministry of Justice, being endowed the Encomienda of the Order of Civil Merit in 1998.

He was interned in March 2020 in the Hospital de la Paz due to COVID-19 along with his wife; Tatary died weeks later, on 6 April, at the age of 72 during the COVID-19 pandemic in the Community of Madrid. He was buried at the Muslim cemetery of Griñón.

== Bibliography ==
- Ortega Sánchez, José María; Callejo Maudes, Javier (2017). "Los orígenes del Islam en España, de mercenarios, misioneros, estudiantes y conversos (y II)". Journal of the Sociology and Theory of Religion. 6: 167–201. ISSN 2255-2715.
- Rosón Lorente, Francisco Javier (2008). ¿El retorno de Tariq? Comunidades etnorreligiosas en el Albayzín granadino (PDF). Granada: Universidad de Granada. ISBN 978-84-691-4584-5.
