= Madrid Central Mosque =

Mosque in Madrid, Spain

- Spanish: Mezquita Central de Madrid; Arabic: مسجد مدريد المركزي
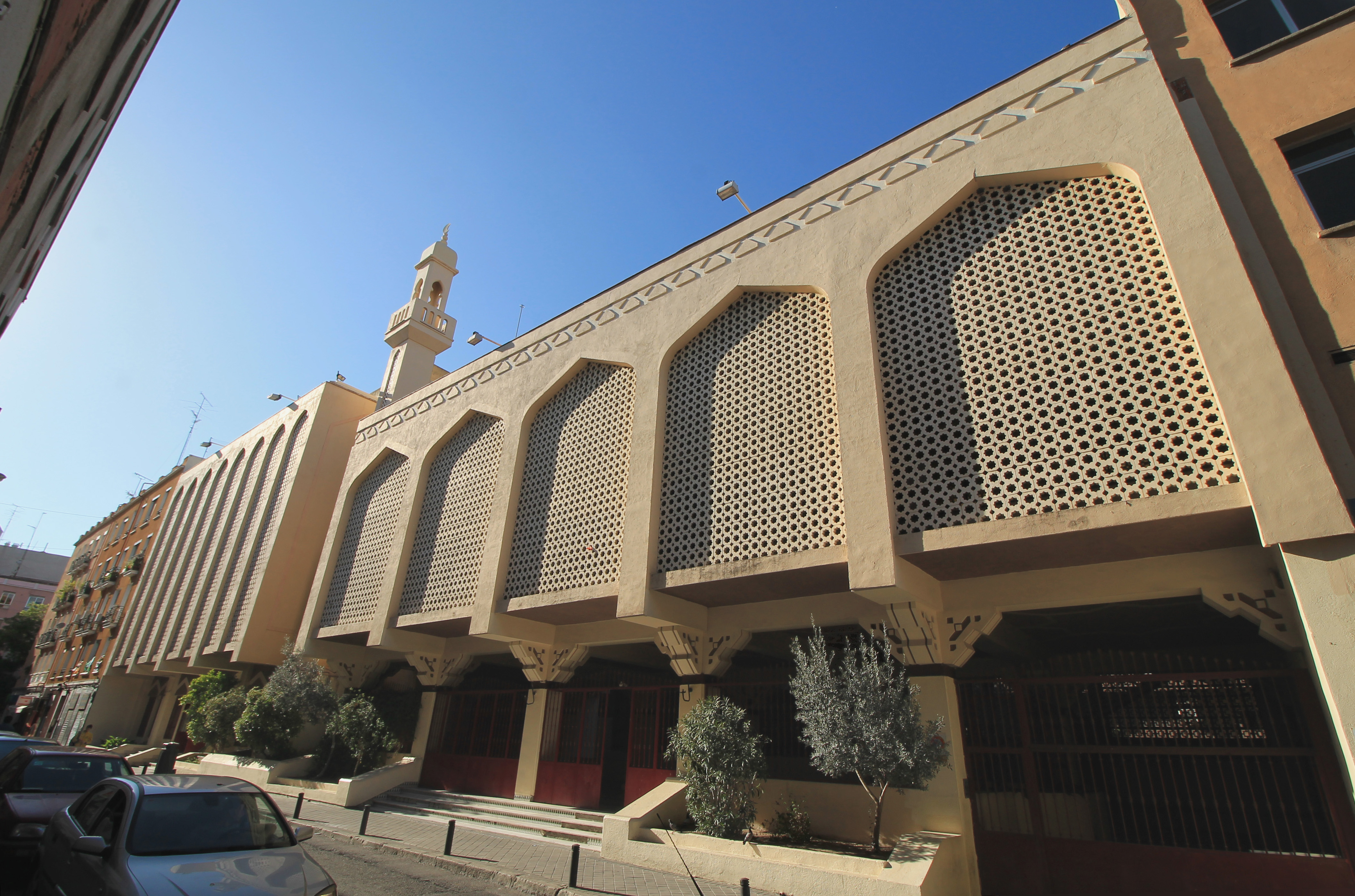
- The mosque in 2015

- Location of the mosque in greater Madrid

Religion
- Affiliation: Islam
- Ecclesiastical or organizational status: Mosque
- Status: Active

Location
- Location: Cuatro Caminos, Tetuán, Madrid
- Country: Spain
- Interactive map of Madrid Central Mosque
- Coordinates: 40°27′24.2″N 3°42′3.6″W

Architecture
- Architect: Juan Mora
- Type: Mosque architecture
- Completed: 1988

Specifications
- Dome: One
- Minaret: One

Website
- ucide.org

The Madrid Central Mosque (Spanish: Mezquita Central de Madrid; Arabic: مسجد مدريد المركزي) is a mosque, located in the Cuatro Caminos neighborhood of the Tetuán district of Madrid, Spain. During its construction, its proximity to Estrecho (literally strait, after the Strait of Gibraltar) metro station gave birth to the popular name of the Strait Mosque.

== History ==
After its dedication as Waqf land, it took years to collect enough individual donations to construct the mosque. Opened in 1988, it became the first mosque in the capital since the end of the Islamic rule in 1085.

Designed by the architect Juan Mora, it is the headquarters of the Union of Islamic Communities of Spain and the Islamic Community of Madrid. Abu-Bakr Mosque has a cooperation agreement in force with the Community of Madrid, and with the State through the Islamic Commission of Spain.

== Description ==
The building, spread over four floors, has in addition to the mosque and offices, a nursery, a school, a library, an auditorium and a shop. It performs worship, charitable, educational, cultural and social functions, having signed an agreement with Al-Azhar University for the training and provision of imams.

== See also ==
- Islam in Spain
- List of mosques in Spain
- List of former mosques in Spain
