= Muslim Council for Cooperation in Europe =

Islamic organization in the European Union

- Founded: 1996
- Type: Religious representation
- Location: Brussels
- Region served: European Union
- Key people: Mr Mohamed Laroussi
- Website: CMCE

The Muslim Council for Cooperation in Europe (MCCE) is a representative body of European citizens of Muslim faith before the EU administration for advice, representation and intra-European collaboration.

== Historical background ==
In 1996, in Strasbourg is constituted the Muslim Council for Cooperation in Europe, being among its members: The Strasbourg Mosque (France), Central Council of Muslims in Germany (ZMD), the Supreme Council of Muslims in Belgium (CSMB) of the Muslim Executive of Belgium, the Union of Islamic Communities of Spain (UCIDE) of the Islamic Commission of Spain, the mosque Adda'wa Paris (France) and the Italian Islamic Religious Community (COREIS). In 1997, the MCCE has joined the initiative "A Soul for Europe" in the framework of "Dialogue with religions, churches and humanism" as part of the Group of Policy Advisors in the European Commission. From 1998 members the Hungarian Islamic Community

== Representatives ==
The directive of the MCCE is composed by their elected representatives:

- President: Mohamed Laroussi (Belgium).
- Vice-president: Riaj Tatary (Spain).
- Secretary: Mamoun Mobayed (United Kingdom).
- Members: Yahya Pallavicini (Italy), Nadeem Elyas (Germany), Zoltan Bolek (Hungary).

Delegates to the coordination committee before the European Commission: Mohammed Hawari, Mohammed Jamouchi.
