= Global Relief Foundation =

Islamic charity designated as a terrorist financing front by the US

- Foundation Secours Mondial
- Abbreviation: GRF; FSML
- Formation: 1992
- Dissolved: November 14, 2001; 24 years ago
- Type: NGO
- Headquarters: Bridgeview, Illinois, U.S.
- Services: Humanitarian aid to Muslims in conflict zones (ostensibly)
- Key people: Rabih Haddad (Chief executive); Nabil Sayadi (European director)
- Main organ: Al Thilal
- Affiliations: Taliban; al-Qaeda; Armed Islamic Group of Algeria; Egyptian Islamic Jihad; al-Jama'a al-Islamiyya; Harkat-ul-Jihad al-Islami
- Budget: $700,000 USD (1992)

The Global Relief Foundation (GRF), also known as Foundation Secours Mondial (FSML), was an Islamic charity based in Bridgeview, Illinois, until it was raided and shut down on December 14, 2001, and listed among the "Designated Charities and Potential Fundraising Front Organizations for Foreign Terrorist Organizations" ("DCPFFOFTO") by the United States Treasury Department in 2002. According to the US Treasury, "The Global Relief Foundation (GRF) … and its officers and directors have connections to, and have provided support for and assistance to, Osama bin Laden (OBL), al Qaeda (aQ), and other known terrorist groups (OKTG)." It was one of the few organizations registered with the Taliban.

== Mission ==
GRF described itself as a not-for profit (NFP), non-governmental organization (NGO) established to provide humanitarian and charitable relief to Muslims in conflict zones such as Afghanistan, Bosnia, Chechnya, Kashmir, and Lebanon. In addition to undertaking charitable work, however, GRF served as an organization issuing propaganda for global jihad. The magazine, Al Thilal, published by the GRF, did not spread messages of a humanitarian organization but rather served as anti-American and Anti-Semitic propaganda, calling for jihad throughout the world, especially in Palestine, Bosnia, and Kashmir.

== History ==
The GRF began operations in the United States as a tax-exempt, non-profit, charitable organization in 1992 and quickly became the largest Islamic charity in the U.S. The organization initially had a budget of $700,000. By the end of the 1990s GRF was reporting $5 million in annual donations, and 90% of that money was shipped abroad. Some materials distributed by GRF at this time glorify martyrdom through jihad and state that donations will be used to support the Mujahedin. GRF had overseas offices in Islamabad, Pakistan; Brussels, Belgium; Sarajevo, Bosnia; Zagreb, Croatia; and Baku, Azerbaijan.

The FBI started investigating GRF prior to 9/11 on the basis that it supported radical Islamic interests like that of al-Qaeda. In 2000, FBI agents found that while a majority of the funding from GRF goes to legitimate relief organizations, a significant amount goes to terrorist groups like the Armed Islamic Group of Algeria, the Egyptian Islamic Jihad, al-Jama'a al-Islamiyya, and Kashmiri Harkat-ul-Jihad al-Islami in addition to Al-Qaeda. The FBI reported that there were two types of donors to GRF, those that thought they were donating to humanitarian causes and a select few who knew that the purpose of their donations was to support global jihad. After 9/11, the U.S. Government froze GRF's assets and started a criminal investigation into its activities; the government arrested and ultimately deported GRF's chief executive, Rabih Haddad.

The FBI and Treasury Department have asserted links between Global Chevra Foundation founder Rabih Haddad and Makhtab al-Khidamat. Makhtab al-Khidamat was founded by Osama bin Laden's mentor Abdullah Azzam. In 2002, it was reported that Nabil Sayadi, the group's European director, was "a close collaborator" with Wadih el-Hage.

Wadih el-Hage is alleged to have been a personal aide to Osama bin Laden, who was convicted of involvement in the American embassy bombings.

Sayadi claimed that El-Hage had approached the foundation about funding a malaria abatement program in Africa, which was refused as it was out of the foundation's scope. Sayadi maintains that any contact with El-Hage was "absolutely innocent."

Haddad was arrested by the INS on immigration charges when the group's offices were raided, and later deported to Lebanon. Lawyers representing the organisation accused the US government of a "disregard for civil rights and constitutional rights" in the wake of 9/11 and believed the connection between Global Relief and terrorism to be "weak", criticised the "guilty by association" policy and the use of "secret evidence rules" granted under the Patriot Act. Supporters of the foundation claimed that it was unfairly targeted, denied due process and closed before any evidence linking it to terrorism had been produced.

According to the Treasury Department, GRF helped fund a number of al Qaeda-sponsored activities, including bombings of the U.S. embassies in Kenya and Tanzania and armed action against groups perceived to be un-Islamic.

Global Relief sued the Treasury Department for release of its assets in January 2002. GRF sought redress in Federal court, challenging the government's authority to shut the charity down and seeking an injunction to stop the seizure of its money and assets. On December 31, 2002, the U.S. Seventh Circuit Court of Appeals declined to reverse the Treasury seizure.

In November 2001, the GRF sued The New York Times, the Associated Press, ABC, and The Boston Globe for defamation after various news outlets reported on GRF ties to terror financing and fundraising. Lawyers for Global Relief sued a number of news organizations for libel for publishing FBI and Justice Department charges. The suit was dismissed by the U.S. Seventh Circuit Court of Appeals on December 1, 2004. The court's opinion stated that "All of the reports were either true or substantially true recitations of the government's suspicions about and actions against GRF." In 2004, a federal appeals court found that the GRF's case against these media outlets was without merit.

== Terrorist activity ==
According to the U.S. Treasury, a set of photographs and negatives discovered in 1997 in a trash dumpster outside of GRF's office in Illinois depicts large shipping boxes displayed under a GRF banner. The boxes were full of sophisticated communications equipment, including approximately 200 handheld radio transceivers, long-range radio antennas, and portable power packs, with an estimated total value of $120,000. Other photographs depict fighters armed with automatic rifles, a sand bagged bunker with a radio antenna mounted outside, and mutilated corpses with the name "KPI" (Kashmir Press International) printed alongside. Yet another photograph displays two dead men with the caption "Hizbul Mujahideen," a known terrorist organization operating in the Kashmir region. On the reverse side of the photograph was handwritten in Arabic, "two martyrs killed by the Indian government."

GRF has stocked and promoted audio tapes and books which glorify armed jihad, including "The international conspiracy against Jihad" and "The Jihad in its present stage."

GRF published several Arabic newsletters and pamphlets that advocate armed action through jihad against groups perceived to be un-Islamic. For example, one 1995 GRF pamphlet reads "God equated martyrdom through JIHAD with supplying funds for the JIHAD effort. All contributions should be mailed to: GRF." Another GRF newsletter requested donations "for God's cause – they [the Zakat funds] are disbursed for equipping the raiders, for the purchase of ammunition and food, and for their [the Mujahideen's] transportation so that they can raise God the Almighty's word . . . it is likely that the most important of disbursement of Zakat in our times is on the jihad for God's cause . . . ."

In November 2001, during the airstrikes in Afghanistan, a GRF medical relief coordinator traveled to Kabul, against the advice of the U.S. Department of State, and engaged in dealings and negotiations with Taliban officials until the collapse of the Taliban regime.

GRF received $18,521 from the Holy Land Foundation for Relief and Development (HLF) in 2000. HLF, a Dallas, Texas-based Islamic charitable organization, was designated under E.O. 13224 on December 4, 2001, and under the European Union's Regulation (EC) No. 2580/2001 on June 17, 2002, for its ties to terrorism.
