= Detroit Free Press v. Ashcroft =

Court case

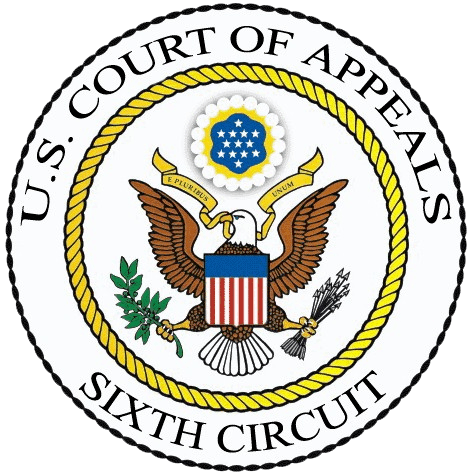
- Court: United States Court of Appeals for the Sixth Circuit
- Full case name: DETROIT FREE PRESS, et al., Plaintiffs-Appellees, v. John ASHCROFT, et al., Defendants-Appellants.
- Decided: August 26, 2002
- Citations: Detroit Free Press v. Ashcroft, No. 02-1437 (6th Cir. Apr. 19, 2002)

Court membership
- Judges sitting: Damon Keith, Martha Craig Daughtrey, James G. Carr

Case opinions
- Affirmed 3-0 that the blanket use of the Creppy Directive was unconstitutional.

Detroit Free Press v. Ashcroft was a case that was heard before the United States Court of Appeals for the Sixth Circuit in August 2002. The plaintiffs, Detroit Free Press, Detroit News, Michigan Representative John Conyers, and Rabih Haddad argued that it was a violation of the First Amendment for the defendants, U.S. Attorney General John Ashcroft, Chief Immigration Judge Creppy, and Immigration Judge Elizabeth Hacker, to apply a blanket ruling of the Creppy Directive in order to keep immigration hearings closed to the press and the public. The case affirmed 3-0 that the blanket application of the Creppy Directive to all immigration hearings was unconstitutional.

== Background ==
During the aftermath of the September 11 attacks, the US launched an effort to counter terrorist activity, including one to limit those that could attend the deportation hearings of foreign aliens. Under the lead of Attorney General John Ashcroft, Chief Immigration Judge Michael Creppy directed all immigration judges to close to the public and the press all immigration hearings that were thought to be of "special interest" to the September 11 investigation. Special interest cases were defined as "those where the alien is suspected of having connections to, or information about, terrorist organizations that are plotting against the United States." These cases were intended to be handled "in secret, closed off from the public" to uphold a "compelling government interest" of national security. Officials closed the cases to any public or press and removed them from the court's docket, eliminating public records of the case. This rule of closed deportation hearings became known as the "Creppy Directive."

== Rabih Haddad ==
On December 14, 2001, Rabih Haddad, a Lebanese national, was arrested after his temporary visa had expired. He was operating an Islamic charity that was suspected to be channeling funds to a terrorist organization. In light of the recent September 11 attacks and the Creppy Directive, the Government labeled his case as special interest. Haddad was then denied bail and detained, and his case was closed from public and the press. Believing this closure to be a violation to First Amendment rights to speech and press, The Detroit News, Detroit Free Press, Metro Times, Haddad, and Michigan Representative John Conyers filed a suit against John Ashcroft, Michael Creppy, and Immigration Judge Elizabeth Hacker (the Government) claiming that the Creppy Directive was unconstitutional.

== Opinion of the 6th Circuit Court of Appeals ==
Haddad, the newspapers' plaintiffs, and Rep. Conyer filed complaints and asserted claims under the following provisions:

1. the Administrative Procedures Act ("APA"), 5 U.S.C. § 551 et seq.;
2. the Immigration and Nationality Act ("INA"), 8 U.S.C. § 1101 et seq., and the regulations promulgated thereunder, 8 C.F.R. §§3.27 & 240.10; and
3. the First and Fifth Amendments to the United States Constitution.

In response, the Government cited several cases to prove precedent that Congress had broad authority over immigration hearings.

- The Chinese Exclusion Case – During the Gold Rush, many Chinese immigrated to China. In response, California lawmakers petitioned Congress to stop the influx of immigrants. The petition charged that the “presence of Chinese laborers had a baneful effect on the state.” Thus, Congress gave the Government the “power to expel or exclude aliens.” This power was said be a fundamental sovereign attribute, not a provision of the Constitution. In its holding, the court said that the Constitution limited Congress’ control over immigration.
- Kleindienst v. Mandel – Mandel, a Belgian citizen and self-proclaimed revolutionary Marxist, sought entry to speak at a conference at Stanford University. He applied for a non-immigrant visa and was denied by a provision of the Immigration and Nationality Act and by the court after several professors alleged this denial violated their 1st Amendment rights. The court acknowledged that Mandel's 1st Amendment rights were involved, but it still affirmed the conviction.

The Sixth Court of Appeals acknowledged that both cases gave Congress broad authority over immigration, but said they were not analogous to this case. The Chinese Exclusion Case held that the Constitution still limited Congress’ power. The Kleindienst case was one of exclusion, and the question of the Creppy Directive does not affect the outcome of deportation hearings, just how they are conducted. The 5th Amendment states that all “persons” are entitled the right of due process of law. This is true for aliens already in the US. Aliens attempting to enter the US are not considered “persons” within the meaning of the 5th Amendment. The Sixth Court found that since Haddad had already established residence in the US, he was entitled to the 5th Amendment's guarantee of due process. In the court's opinion of Kwock Jan Fat v. White, it “warned of the danger of secret hearings, given the government’s extraordinary power.” Thus, the court said that immigration proceedings should remain to check the government's power.

=== Application of the Richmond Newspapers Test ===
The Richmond Newspaper Test determines whether the press and public have a 1st Amendment right to access criminal hearings. The Sixth Circuit Court of Appeals found that deportation hearings may also use this same test. It must answer two questions:

1. Have the hearings been traditionally open to the public?
2. Does public access to the hearing play a positive role in the process?

The court found that hearings have been traditionally open to the public and that public access does play a positive role in the process. In the court's dicta for Kwock Jan Fat v. White, it warned of the dangers of secret hearings, because they give the government extraordinary power. The court found that the Creppy Directive was unconstitutional because it took away the freedom of the press, which the courts said, serves as a check to judicial power.

== Ruling ==
The 6th Circuit Court of Appeals affirmed 3-0 that the blanket use of the Creppy Directive was unconstitutional. It further held that in order to prevent the disclosure of information in immigration hearings, it must have a “compelling government interest, and [be] narrowly tailored to serve that interest.” It found that the Haddad trial did have a compelling government interest of national security but was not narrowly tailored since the government could apply the special interest label to virtually any immigration hearing it wanted. Therefore, the court ruled that it could not apply the Creppy Directive and label this case a special interest one in order to close it to the public and press.

== Differences of North Jersey Media Group, Inc. v. Ashcroft ==
The Third Circuit Court of Appeals decided North Jersey Media Group, Inc. v. Ashcroft, a similar case to Detroit Free Press v. Ashcroft, in October 2002 but decided in favor of Ashcroft and the immigration courts instead of the Plaintiff. North Jersey Media Group feared that as a result of the Creppy Directive, it would be closed from “possibly hundreds” of immigration hearings. Unlike Detroit Free Press v. Ashcroft, the court found that the right to open hearings did not pass both parts of the Richmond Newspapers Test because there was not sufficient history of openness in immigration hearings and that allowing openness to the public and the press presented too many negative ramifications to the hearings.
