= Nabil Sayadi =

Nabil Sayadi is the former director and founder of the European branch of Global Relief Foundation, centred in Belgium.

Sayadi was born in Lebanon. He was accused of transferring 200,000 Euros to Al-Qaeda financier Mohammed Zouaydi, which caused him to be placed on FBI and United Nations watch-lists along with his wife and GRF secretary Patricia Vinck. As a result, Belgium froze their bank accounts.

On January 6, 2006, two Belgian judges exonerated Sayadi of any links with Al Qaeda after Sayadi's lawyer declared: "If the US has something against them, they should give it to us."
