= Suhail (star) =

Suhail, from Arabic: سهيل, is the common name of a number of stars typically seen near the southern horizon.

It is part of the traditional names of several stars in the constellation Argo Navis.

- Lambda Velorum, now officially named Suhail by the IAU Working Group on Star Names, was called in Arabic: السهيل الوزن, romanized: Al-Suhail al-Wazn, but later shortened to just Suhail.
- Gamma Velorum (also known as Regor) has the traditional name al-Suhail al-Muhlif (السهيل المخلف).
- Zeta Puppis (also known as Naos) has the traditional name Suhail Hadar (سهيل هدار).
- In addition to these, the star Canopus (α Carinae), the second-brightest star in the night sky, is called in Arabic: سهيل, romanized: suhayl or in Turkish: Süheyl.
