= Al-Morabito Mosque =

Mosque in Córdoba, Spain

- Spanish: Mezquita El Morabito
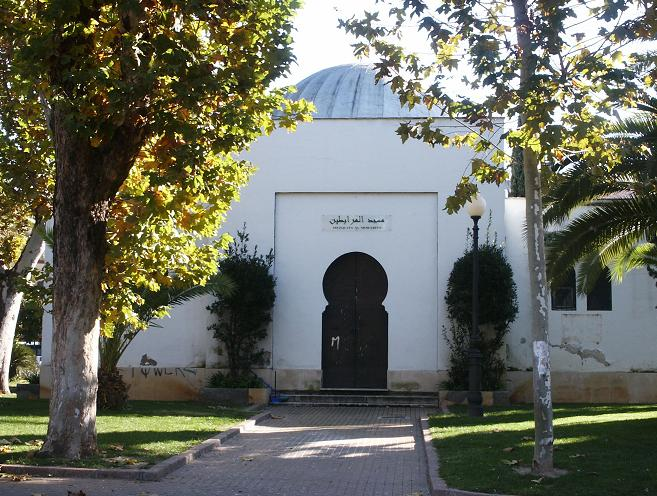

- Location of the mosque in the Province of Córdoba

Religion
- Affiliation: Islam
- Ecclesiastical or organisational status: Mosque
- Status: Active

Location
- Location: Córdoba
- Country: Spain
- Coordinates: 37.889924°N 4.778120°W

Architecture
- Type: Mosque architecture
- Completed: 1938
- Dome: One

Al-Morabito Mosque (Spanish: Mezquita El Morabito) is a mosque in Córdoba, Spain. It was built during the Spanish Civil War as a gift for general Francisco Franco's Muslim soldiers and is considered Spain's first modern mosque.

From 1950 to the early 1990s, it served as a specialized library on Islam. After the Spanish Transition and the return of democracy, the Association of Muslims in Córdoba asked the municipal government, then led by the mayor Julio Anguita, to give them the building to perform the congregational prayers. The application was accepted and opened in 1992 again as a mosque.

== See also ==
- Islam in Spain
