= Buen Acuerdo Mosque =

Mosque in Melilla, Spain

- Mezquita del Buen Acuerdo
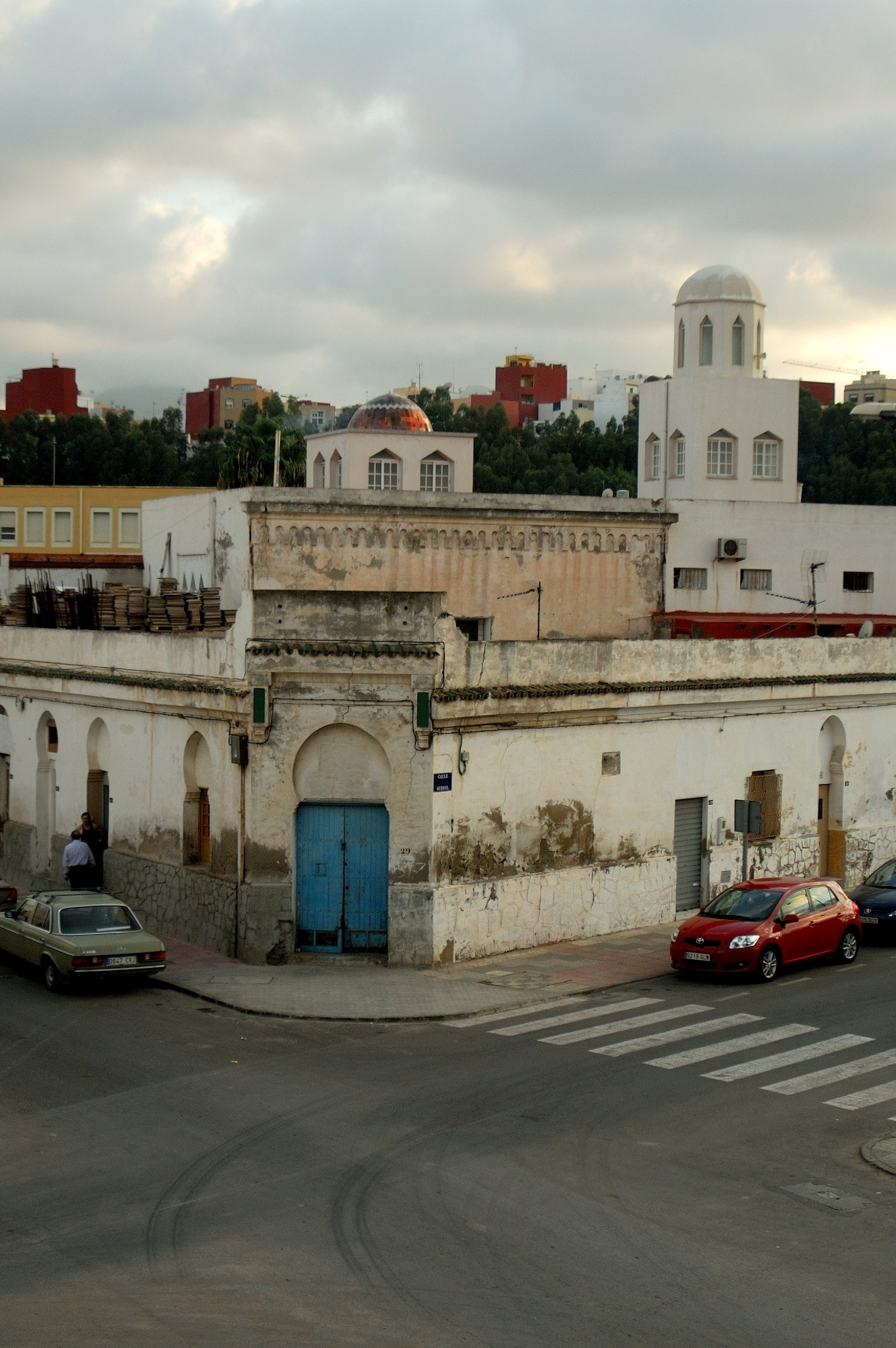

Religion
- Affiliation: Islam

Location
- Municipality: Melilla
- Country: Spain
- Interactive map of Buen Acuerdo Mosque
- Coordinates: 35.288741°N 2.944208°W

Architecture
- Architect: José Larrucea Garma

The Buen Acuerdo Mosque (Spanish: Mezquita del Buen Acuerdo) was the first mosque built in Spain during the Reconquista period. It is located on Calle Querol, in the ensanche of New Melilla of the city of Melilla, part of the historic site of the city, and declared as a Bien de Interés Cultural.

== History ==
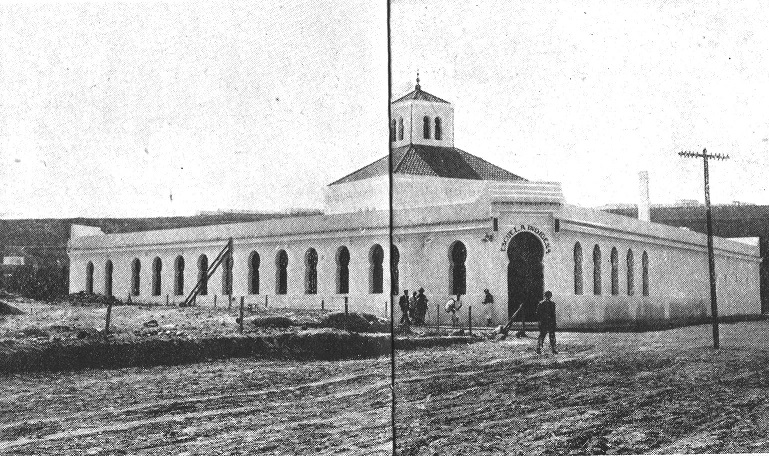

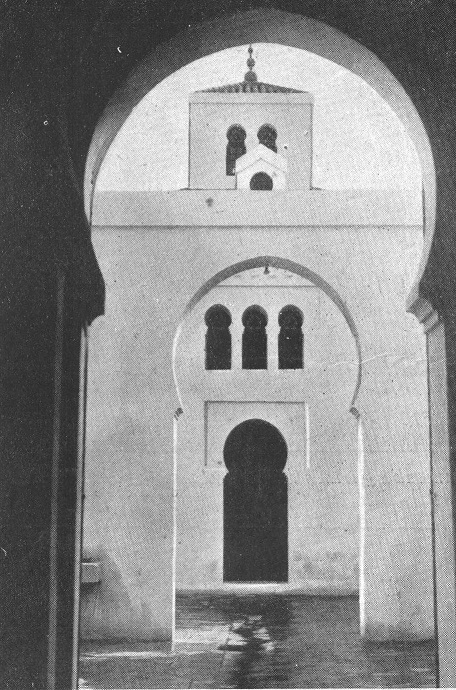

It was built between 1926 and 1927 to a design by architect José Larrucea Gamma, on the remains of an earlier structure by military engineer José de la Gándara. It stands on land ceded in 1905 to Morocco's Ministry of Religious Affairs, the Habús, and was inaugurated in 1927.

In the 1980s, lightning destroyed the prayer hall, with its magnificent artesonado ceiling, and it was reconstructed with reinforced concrete, columns and roof lanterns.

== Description ==
It was built with local stone for the walls, solid brick for the jambs and arches, and wood and concrete for the roofs. It has a triangular floor plan, with chamfered corners and a single ground floor.
