= Central Mosque of Melilla =

Mosque in Melilla, Spain

- Mezquita Central de Melilla
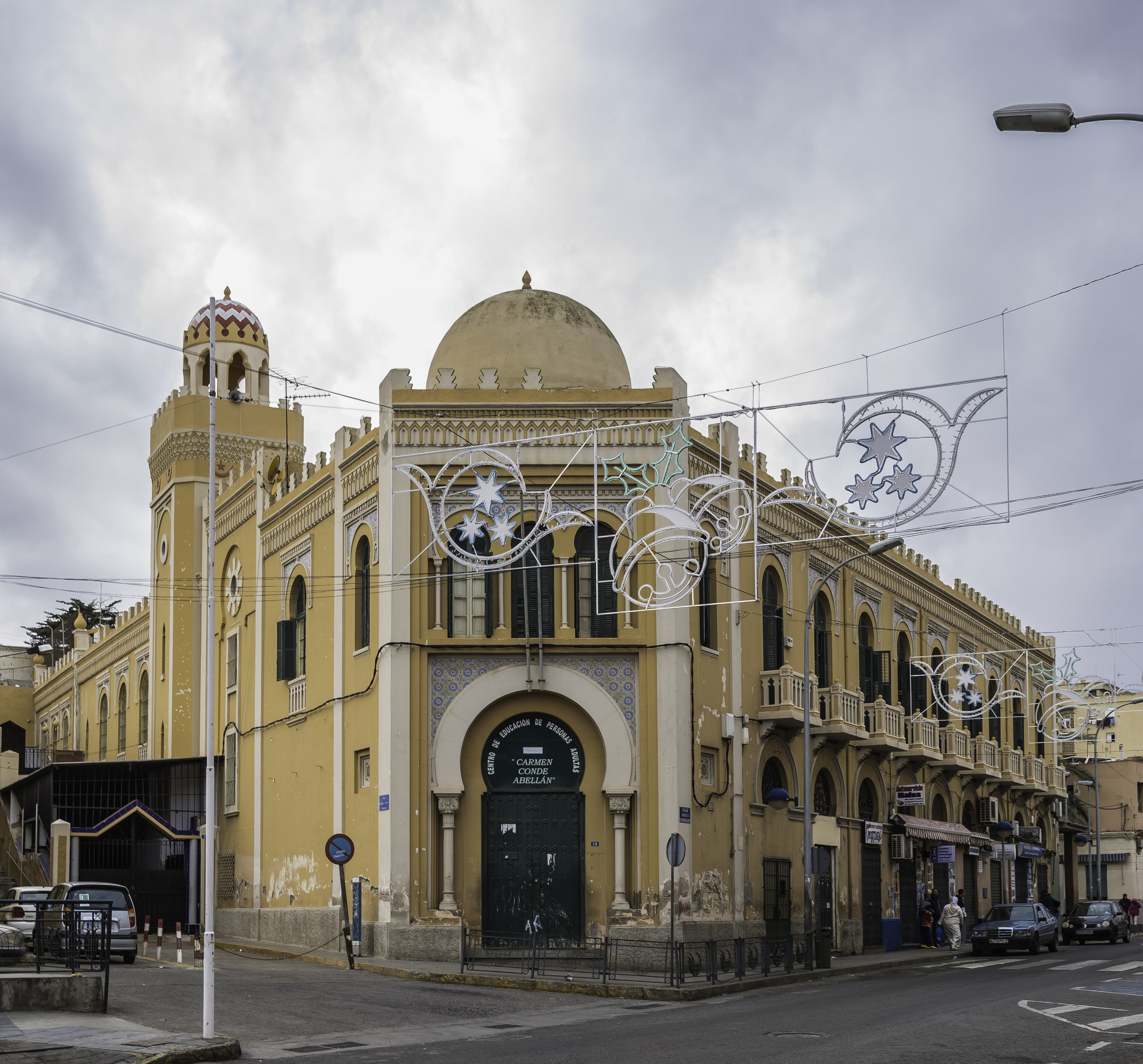

Religion
- Affiliation: Islam

Location
- Location: Melilla
- Country: Spain
- Interactive map of Central Mosque of Melilla
- Coordinates: 35.2958667°N 2.9450028°W

Architecture
- Architect: Enrique Nieto
- Type: Mosque
- Style: Neo-Moorish

The Central Mosque (Spanish: Mezquita Central) is an aljama mosque in the Spanish city of Melilla. Located in the modernist ensanche of the city, on García Cabrelles street, it forms part of the historical and cultural ensemble of the city and has been designated as a "bien de interés cultural."

== History ==
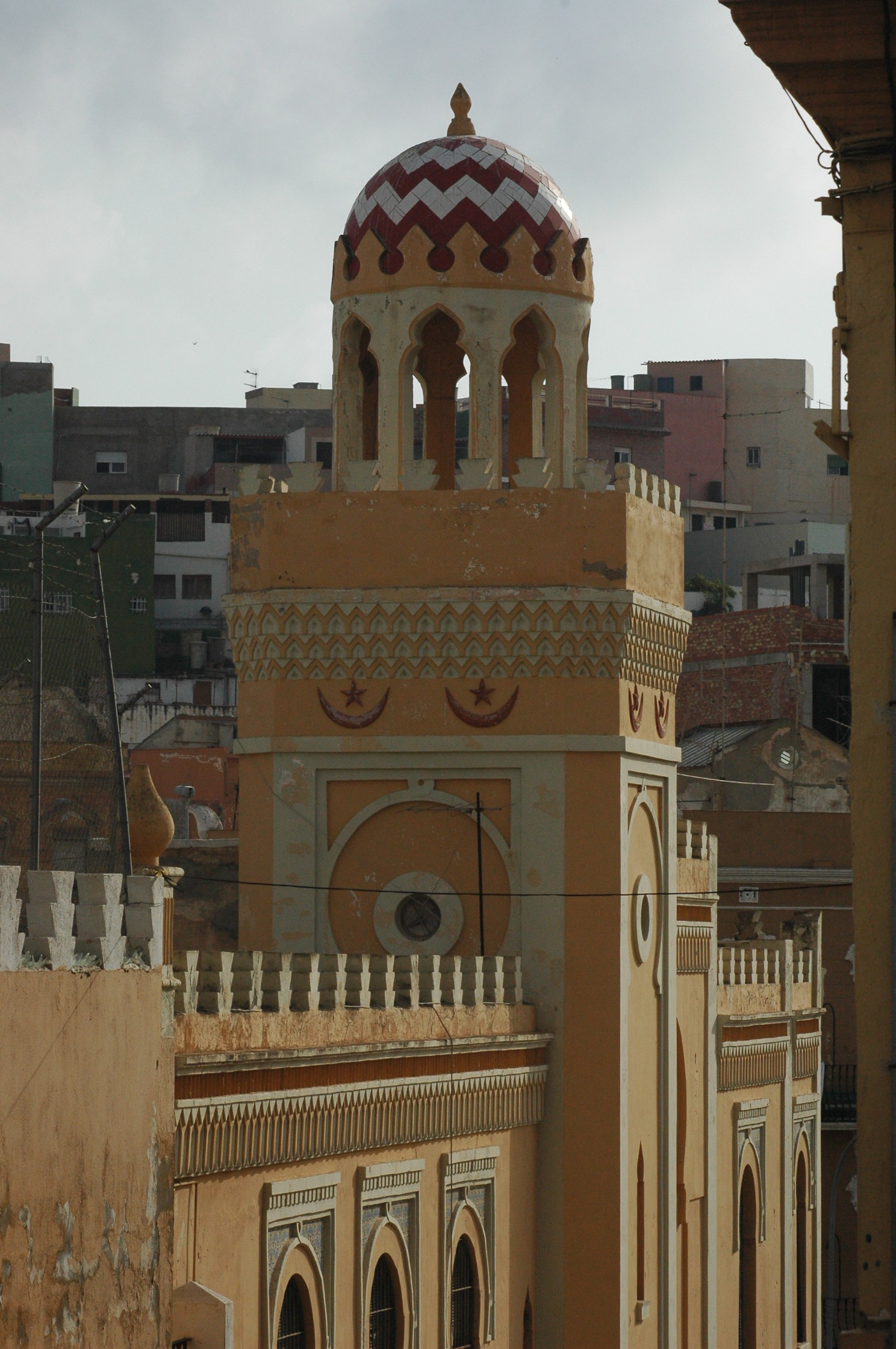
Minaret and dome of the mosque

It was built between 1945 and 1947, according to a project by architect Enrique Nieto from July 1938, and inaugurated on 7 September 1947 by the High Commission of Spain in Morocco and lieutenant general José Enrique Varela.
