= Islamic Commission of Spain =

Islamic organization based in Madrid, Spain

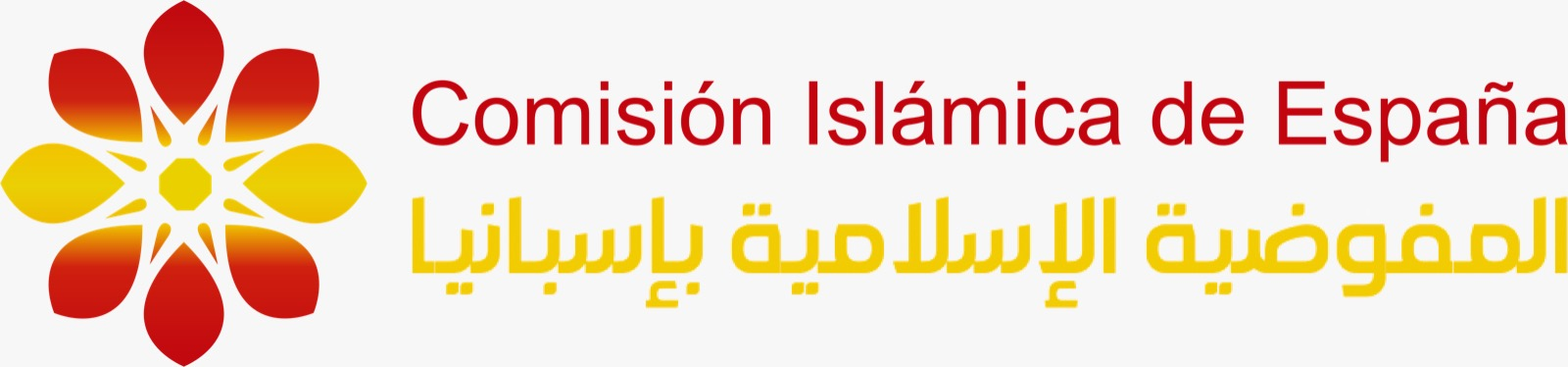
- Founded: 1992
- Founder: FEERI & UCIDE
- Location: Madrid
- Key people: Mr. Mohamed Ajana; Dr. Aiman Adlbi
- Website: CIE

Islamic Commission of Spain (Spanish: Comisión Islámica de España) is the representative organ of Islam and Muslims before the citizenship and the Administration for the representation, negotiation, signature, and follow-up on the Islam - State agreements adopted in Law 26/1992. The Islamic Commission of Spain meets periodically with representatives of the Administration in the Mixed Paritary Commission; in addition to the conjunctural communications with the Ministry of the Presidency on legislative initiatives, and with the Main Directorate of Religious Affairs of the Ministry of Justice.

== Presidents ==
First President (before General Secretary) of the Islamic Commission of Spain, Riaj Tatary Bakry, died in April 2020.

The current elected president is Dr Aiman Adlbi (from 2020).

== Historical summary ==
In 1967, the first law allowing Muslims to organize themselves, after a gap of centuries, was promulgated in Spain, leading to the establishment in 1968 of the first local Muslim Association in Spain in Melilla, and in 1971, the first national association, the Association of Muslims in Spain (AME), which has its headquarters in Madrid. Under the Spanish Constitution the Statutory Law of Religious Freedom is promulgated, now in force, and the Union of Islamic Communities of Spain was constituted (UCIDE), as well as the Spanish Federation of Islamic Religious Entities (FEERI), which together constitute the Islamic Commission of Spain (CIE), UCIDE is a member of the Muslim Council for Cooperation in Europe (MCCE) in Brussels, which is a consultative body to the European Union.

== Representatives ==
Previous to the statutes of 2015, the direction of CIE was made up by the presidents of these two federations, UCIDE and FEERI. However, the current statute has two main representative bodies: the governing body (junta directiva) and the permanent committee (comisión permanente). The governing body comprises the president, the secretary, and the treasurer.

Permanent Committee:

- The permanent committee is made up of 25 members which are proportional to the number of religious communities. The federations and religious communities integrated in the CIE are the ones responsible for the assignment of the members.

== See also ==
- Islam in Spain
- Islamic Federation of the Canary Islands
- Muslim Executive of Belgium
- Central Council of Muslims in Germany
- French Council of the Muslim Faith
- Council on American-Islamic Relations
- Muslim Council of Britain
- Muslim Council of Sweden
