= Union of Islamic Communities of Spain =

Religious organization based in Madrid, Spain

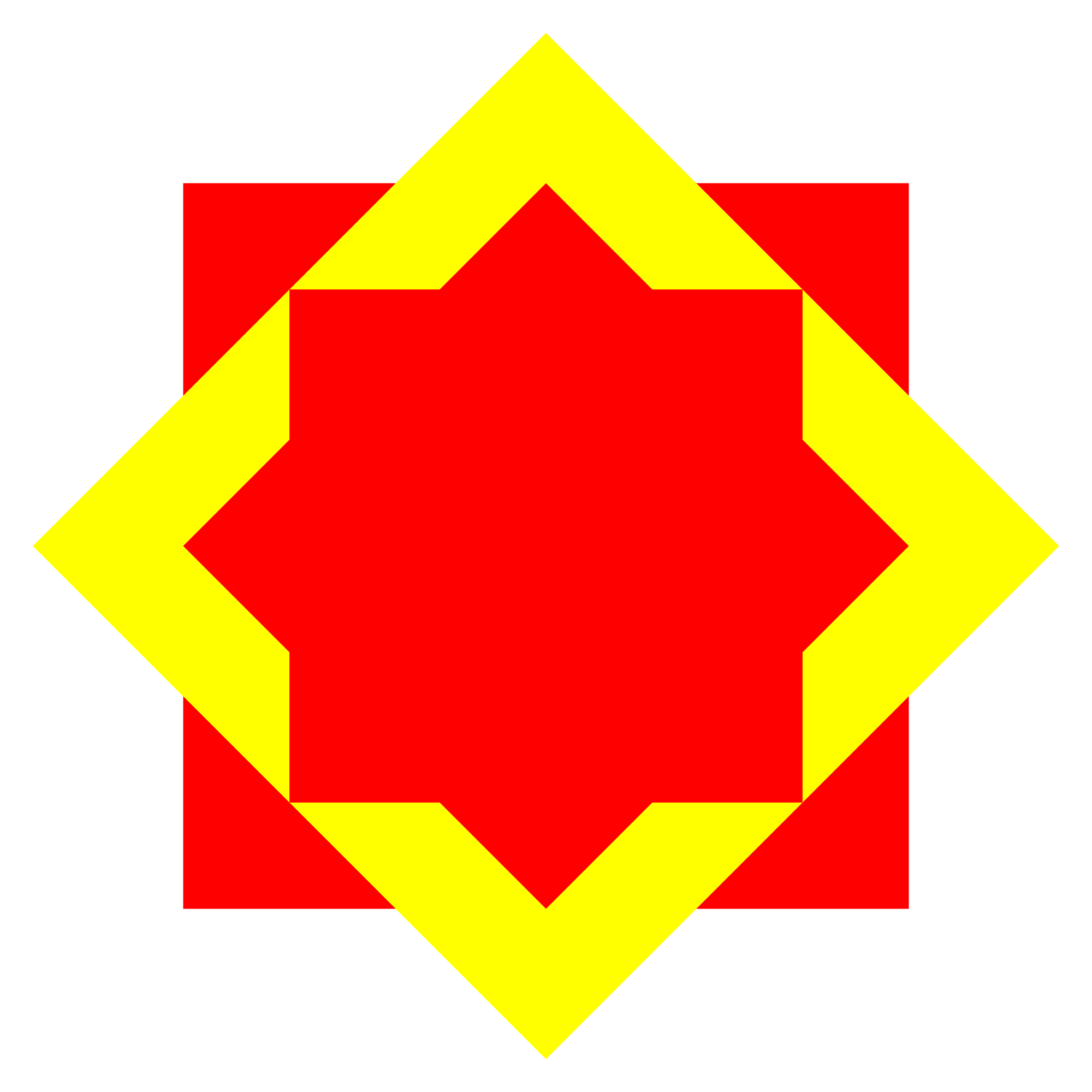
- Founded: 1981
- Founder: Muslim Association of Spain
- Location: Madrid, Spain
- Origins: Muslim Students Union of Spain
- Key people: Aiman Adlbi
- Website: ucide.org

The Union of Islamic Communities of Spain (UCIDE; Spanish: Unión de Comunidades Islámicas de España) is a religious organization with seat centered in Madrid. It is supported by Spanish Islamic religious communities. UCIDE is registered in the Registry of Religious Entities at the Spanish Ministry of Presidency and has a cooperation agreement in force with the Community of Madrid.

Its purpose is the development of Islamic religious activities. Under an agreement signed with the University of Valencia was established the Chair for the Three Religions for the research, teaching and information about Islam, Judaism, and Christianity.

It is a co-founder of the Islamic Commission of Spain (CIE), representative at the Spanish State, and of the Muslim Council for Cooperation in Europe (CMCE), representative organ at the European Union. After death of Riaj Tatary, the elected president is Aiman Adlbi, who is part of the Advisory Commission on Religious Freedom.

== History ==
In the 1960s groups of Muslim university students created student associations and cultural centers, evolving into the "Muslim Students Union of Spain". In 1967, Spain enacted the first law allowing Muslims to organize for religious purposes, becoming in 1968 the nationwide "Muslim Association of Spain" with its central seat in Madrid. It was registered in 1971. They actively contributed to the preparation of the Spanish Constitution of 1978 and the Statutory Law on Religious Freedom of 1980. In the same year the Union of Islamic Communities of Spain emerged, with registration in 1991.

In 1989 the "declaration of notorious rooting" of Islam in Spain, was developed, prior to the negotiation and signing the "Cooperation Agreement" between the Spanish State and the "Islamic Commission of Spain", which was established for this purpose with another federation in 1992.

The Economic Convention about teachers of Islamic religious education in schools and the curriculum of the courses to study was approved and published by early 1996 to edit later the religion textbooks Discover Islam for Primary. That same year it created in Strasbourg the "Muslim Council for Cooperation in Europe" (CMCE), with UCIDE as a founding member.

In 2006, the inclusion at the Social Security system for imams and the regulation of prison religious assistants was achieved. The Union of Islamic Communities of Spain has collaboration agreements with Al-Azhar University in Cairo and the Islamic World Educational, Scientific and Cultural Organization, which participates in joint projects with the Spanish State's Foundation for Pluralism and Coexistence.

== Representatives ==
After the 2020 elections UCIDE representatives include:

- President: Aiman Adlbi
- Vice-president: Laarbi Allal Maateis also president of the UCIDE in Ceuta.

The Union is headquartered at the offices of the Muslim Association of Spain as well as the Islamic Community of Madrid, Abu-Bakr Mosque (Madrid). UCIDE also adopts the regional organization of the State, coordinated from its regional offices with their elected representatives.

== See also ==
- Islam in Spain
