= Jaralla al-Marri =

Qatari detainee at Guantanamo Bay

Jaralla Salih Muhammad Khala al-Marri
- ISN 334's Guantanamo detainee assessment
- Born: 12 August 1973 (age 52); Doha, Qatar

Jaralla Salih Muhammad Khala al-Marri is a citizen of Qatar and a former detainee at the United States' Guantanamo Bay detention camp in Cuba, where he was imprisoned for six and a half years. He returned to Qatar on 27 July 2008. He was reportedly born on 12 August 1973, in Doha, Qatar according to the Department of Defense.

== Early life ==
Al Marri studied English in Texas from 1993 to 1994 at Texas A&M University. He returned to Qatar and married his wife in 1995. He has three children.

== Recruitment ==
According to his Department of Defense Detainee Assessment, it is believed that Al Marri traveled to Mecca in 2001 where he met Abu Walid al-Makki who began to talk to him about Islam and jihad. Al-Makki introduced him to Muhammad al-Saudi al-Harabi, who was his contact for joining the jihad in Afghanistan. Because he believed that his family would not support his participation in jihad, he told them that he would be traveling to Pakistan to memorize the Quran. Al Marri arrived in Pakistan on September 6, 2001, and contacted al-Harabi who connected him to a man named al-Zubail who transported him to Kandahar, Afghanistan. He was then moved to the al-Faruq training camp and ultimately back to Pakistan when he was arrested on December 6, 2001, while trying to cross into Pakistan.

== Terrorist support and activities ==
Al Marri was detained at the border of Pakistan and Afghanistan after the September 11, 2001 terrorist attacks. He was suspected of trying to transfer $10,000 of "al-Qaeda operational funds" to his brother Ali Saleh Kahlah al-Marri, under the direction of Khalid Sheikh Mohammed, the mastermind of the attacks.

Since his repatriation to Qatar, he has reportedly been publicizing for a Qatari fundraising campaign called Madid Ahl al-Sham which the Al-Nusra Front endorsed as a fundraising campaign in support of al-Qaeda. The campaign was believed to have been run by Sa'd bin Sa'd Muhammad Shariyan Al Ka'bi and Abd al-Latif Bin Abdullah Salih Muhammad al-Kawari, both of whom are U.S. Treasury Specially Designated Global Terrorists (SDGTs).

== Jail conditions ==
Al Marri's Guantanamo detainee ID number was 334.

=== Al-Marri's position ===
Al-Marri participated in the hunger strikes held during the summer of 2005. According to the Center for Constitutional Rights:

As Jarallah Al-Marri, a prisoner from Qatar, stated, "I participated in a hunger strike for 17 days to protest the inhumane conditions and religious persecution I and hundreds of other prisoners have been subject to at Guantanamo."

Further details of the seriousness of the prisoners' claims are also emerging. Al-Marri, for example, was hospitalized as a result of his hunger strike and a deteriorating heart condition, and placed on an IV. He told his attorney, Jonathan Hafetz of Gibbons Del Deo Dolan Griffinger & Vecchione, that the government had a nurse make sexual advances towards him while he was lying in his hospital bed in a vain attempt to convince him to give up his hunger strike. Al-Marri has been in solitary confinement for over 16 months and today often goes as long as 3 weeks without being allowed outside his cell for recreation. The lights in Al-Marri's cell remain on 24 hours a day, 7 days a week, and he has been denied adequate bedding and clothing. Al-Marri is able to sleep only 2 hours a night, and his physical and mental health have deteriorated significantly.

According to an article in The Columbia Journalist, from 12 December 2005, Al-Marri had only had two visits from his lawyers.

== Detention of Al-Marri's brother ==
Al-Marri's brother, Ali Saleh Kahlah al-Marri, formerly a graduate student at Bradley University, was last held in a South Carolina naval prison, but released on January 18, 2015, and repatriated to Qatar.

On September 10, 2001, al-Marri came to Peoria with his family to become a graduate student at his undergraduate alma mater, Bradley University. Al-Marri was indicted and arrested on credit card fraud and lying to the FBI. He was detained as a supposed al-Qaeda operative who came to the US to assist in a second wave of terrorist attacks. Al-Marri denies this.

== Repatriation and detention by British authorities ==
On July 28, 2008, al-Marri was reported to have been repatriated to Qatar. His cousin and mother thanked the Emir for his help in securing his repatriation.

As part of the repatriation deal between Qatar and the U.S., a signed agreement stipulated that al-Marri would not be allowed to travel outside of Qatar. The Qataris also promised that if he even tried to leave Qatar that they would notify the United States immediately. This, however, did not happen and al-Marri was allowed to leave Qatar twice without the Qataris notifying the United States. He was ultimately arrested on visa fraud in the United Kingdom.

In a telephone interview, al-Marri told reporters he was detained at Heathrow Airport on February 23, 2009, on the claim that his visa application had not stated that he was a former Guantanamo captive. al-Marri said he had told the British officials who helped him complete his visa application about his stay in Guantanamo. Al Marri had toured the United Kingdom on a speaking tour, with Moazzam Begg, a few weeks before his 23 February detention.

Moazzam Begg was arrested in 2014 by the UK on allegations that he was funding and training terrorists in Syria. He has since been released.

The U.S. Ambassador to Qatar at the time determined that the decision to let al Marri travel outside of Qatar despite the agreement had to have been made and approved by Qatar's attorney general. The U.S. has labeled Qatar an "inconsistent" partner in combating terror finance.
