= Business Trading Company =

Qatari commercial developer

- Type: Private
- Founded: 1997
- Key people: Abdulaziz Al Rabban (Chairman)
- Website: Official website

Business Trading Company (BTC) is a Qatari trading company that is mainly composed of project developers, focusing its efforts in for retail complexes with a focus on luxury shopping, dining, and entertainment.

== Overview ==
BTC was found in Qatar in 1997 to offer retail complexes in the region, giving a space for shopping, dining, and entertainment. It has progressed over the years in developing premium malls, entertainment, real estate, and high end brands. The chairman and managing director of BTC is Abdulaziz bin Mohammed al-Rabban.

== Projects ==
The Landmark Shopping Mall, built in 2000, and the Villaggio Shopping Mall, built in 2006, are the company's two most prominent retail complexes, that have had an impact on Qatar's development. The Landmark Shopping Mall is recognized for its innovation in the region in combining shopping and leisure, while K9 the Villaggio Shopping Mall was focused on bringing luxury brands to the region.

The company also plays a large role in the development of real estate projects in Qatar, focusing its efforts on residential, commercial, and luxury hotel projects. BTC has aimed to expand its efforts beyond Qatar, and develop its projects in other countries in the GCC.

BTC is able to secure connections in the State of Qatar and in the Gulf region. It has partnered with JW Marriot to build hotels in both Doha and Bahrain, and has joint ventures with Azadea Group, Remza-BTC, Rash Fashion, Jawad, and Cineco on its retail projects. BTC has become a successful player in Qatar and the Gulf States with a reputation as a multi-million riyal holding and investment company.

== Controversies ==
With BTC being one of the two shareholders of Villagio Mall, Al Rabban was implicated in the 2012 Villaggio Mall Fire incident. This mall fire occurred on a BTC property, Villaggio Mall, and killed 19 people, 13 of whom were toddlers. The fire caused the most damage in Gympanzee daycare center. In the investigation, the daycare center was said to have not acquired the obligatory licensing as a nursery by the ministry of social affairs. Due to this, the daycare did not meet the required safety conditions. The investigation blamed the May 2012 fire and its damages on "lack of adherence to laws, systems and measures by all concerned parties to different degrees." The owners involved were charged in Qatar, and the prosecution argued that the defendants did not comply with the necessary health and safety requirements, and that it was not licensed to operate.

In 2013, Al Rabban was found guilty of involuntary manslaughter due to negligence, and was sentenced to six years in prison. During the 5 hour closing statement of the case, Al Rabban's defense attorney stated that his client did not own any shares in the mall, despite his clear ownership ties to the property. Additionally, during the appeals hearing, the defense lawyers questioned why no one from the U.S. sports firm, Nike, had been charged, considering the fire started in their store at the mall. Al Rabban was later cleared of his charges, and the court deferred his sentence his firm, the Qatari Company for Real Estate and Commercial Projects. In Al Rabban's retrial in April 2016, he failed to appear in court, and had his lawyer notify the court that he could not attend because he was traveling.

Additionally, Al Rabban is married to the niece of Sheikh Thani bin Abdullah al-Thani, a member of Qatar's ruling family, the chairman and managing director of Ezdan Real Estate, the head of Tadawul Holding Group's board, and the founder of Qatari charity RAF. Al-Thani's real estate firm, worth $16 billion, is the largest in the MENA region based on its market capitalization, and his holding company has a capital of over $7.5 billion. He is also a large contributor and leader for prominent Islamic banks in Qatar, including the International Islamic Bank, Qatar Islamic Bank, and Masraf Al Rayan. Al Thani's charity, a semi-official Qatari government charity has been associated with terrorist organizations and terror financing. In one instance, Shafi Al Ajmi, a designated Al Nusra terrorist financier who boasted of receiving funds to prepare mujahedeen in Syria, asked donors to send money to RAF charity.
