= Mansour bin Rashid al-Matroushi =

Qatari Islamist-activist

Mansour bin Rashid al-Matroushi, born 1979, is a Qatari Islamist-activist and blogger, most commonly known for his 2013 arrest and detention.

== Activism and arrest ==
=== Context ===
Following the 2012 coup in Mali and the political instability that followed, Islamist insurgents alongside Tuareg fighters began to make strategic gains. A force of 4,000 French soldiers intervened on January 11. Seven days later a cease-fire agreement was signed between Tuareg fighters and government forces; despite continuing and sporadic terrorist attacks the intervention was considered successful.

France's intervention in the Mali conflict came only two years after their involvement in NATO air-strikes against Muammar Gaddafi’s government forces in Libya.

=== Letter to French embassy ===
On January 28th, 2013 al-Matroushi, along with 150 other activists submitted a request to Qatar’s interior ministry to orchestrate a protest in front of the French embassy in Doha. The protest was intended to criticize France’s planned military intervention in Mali.

The activists’ request to hold a protest was denied. Instead, al-Matroushi and a fellow activist, Mohammad Issa al-Baker, delivered a letter to the embassy which directly addressed the French ambassador. The letter, which would later be described as “threatening” by Qatari authorities, was handed to the French on behalf of 70 activists, whose signatures were not included.

The tone of the letter in question is undoubtedly hostile towards French presence in not only Mali, but North Africa as well, claiming that “it is common knowledge that the crimes [France] committed in Algeria martyred more than a million Muslim persons”. It goes on to state that France is currently killing and torturing Malian Muslims, describing its policies as “terrorist” and “racist”. Perhaps the letter's most alarming statement comes in the form of a warning: “We demand that you immediately cease your military campaign in Mali or else you would be exposing yourselves to the wrath of people who love death as much as you love life”.

Within four days of receiving the letter, the French embassy reported it to Qatari authorities on March 7, but refused to comment publicly.

=== Arrest, detention, and release ===
In the weeks following delivery of the letter, al-Matroushi had received multiple phone calls from state officials questioning him about his activism and recent activities; he was summoned to report for questioning by authorities but refused. On 22 March both al-Matroushi and al-Baker were arrested by plain clothed officers on their way back from a family trip in Mesaieed (approximately 30 miles south of Doha).

The two men were held in solitary confinement with no official charge, and were re-questioned about the nature of the letter. Sultan al-Khalaifi, a fellow-activist, was quoted defending the letter, saying “the letter we sent to the French embassy carried no threat. It was advice”. Al-Khalaifi was previously associated with Alkarama after his 2011 arrest by Qatari authorities.

After numerous appeals and petitions sent by Amnesty International and other human rights groups, the two men were released on April 18, but were subject to a travel-ban. Al-Matroushi later requested permission to travel to Egypt in order to pursue his education which was granted.

=== Controversies and ties to extremism ===
Al-Matroushi's close associate, al-Baker, has been tied to two U.S. designated al-Qaeda financiers and a purported charity that served as a fundraising mechanism for the Al-Nusra Front (al-Qaeda's branch in Syria).

Despite his alleged travel ban, Al-Baker appears in a video of a 2014 aid shipment into Syria (14), furthermore a video was uploaded from Bakr's Twitter account which appears to have been recorded in Turkey. The video promotes Madad Ahl al-Sham, featuring collections and deliveries intended for Syria. Madad Ahl al-Sham was openly endorsed by Nusra Front fighters as well the group's official social media accounts.

Al-Baker also posted to his Twitter account the phone numbers of Sa’ad bin Sa’ad al-Ka’abi and Abd al-Latif bin 'Abdullah al-Kawari. Both al-Ka’abi and al-Kawari were designated as al-Qaeda financiers and facilitators in 2015.

Additionally, Al-Matroushi is associated with Alkarama, which advocated for Matroushi during his detention by authorities. The organization itself has been listed as a terrorist entity by the United Arab Emirates and two of its three founding members, Abdel Rahman al-Nuaymi and Abdul Wahab al-Humayqani, have been designated by the United States government as financiers of terror in 2013. Moreover, Alkarama's legal director, Rachid Mesli, was arrested in Italy on August 19, 2015, under an Algerian warrant through Interpol for his connection to the Islamic Salvation Front.
