= Abd Al-Rahman al-Nuaimi =

Qatar human right advocate

Abd Al-Rahman al-Nuaimi or Abderrahman Al Nuaimi (born 1954) is a Qatari Islamic advocate, financier, and co-founder of the Alkarama human rights NGO. He previously taught Islamic Studies at Qatar University, and once served as president of the Qatar Football Association, as well as having been a board member of Qatar Islamic Bank. He has been accused of being “one of the world’s most prolific terrorist financiers.”

== Political views ==
Al-Nuaimi was a staunch critic of the domestic policies of the former Emir of Qatar, Hamad bin Khalifa. In 1998, he circulated a letter condemning the emir's decisions to enfranchise women and to allow the sale of alcohol, as well as other policies which he described as being contrary to Islamic tradition. The letter was published in local newspapers and was signed by twelve other men, three of whom were members of the ruling family. He was detained without charge the same year, prompting protests in Britain by Islamic activists. He was released in 2001.

== Teaching career ==
Abd Al-Rahman al-Nuaimi was a history professor at Qatar University until 2009. Gulf News reported that al-Nuaimi was “promoting Brotherhood ideals” and encouraged the Qatari Consultative Council to oppose co-education at the Qatar University.

== Qatar Football Association ==
Al-Nuaimi previously served as the president of the Qatar Football Association.

== Human rights advocacy and NGO associations ==
In 2004, al-Nuaimi co-founded Alkarama, a Geneva-based human rights organization. Its mission is to “assist all those in the Arab World subjected to or at risk of extrajudicial executions, disappearances, torture and arbitrary detention,” by connecting them with “international human rights mechanisms.” Alkarama has worked with United Nations human rights bodies including the Committee Against Torture and the Human Rights Committee, as well as prominent international human rights organizations including Human Rights Watch and Amnesty International. Although he denied the accusations leveled against him, he resigned as president of Alkarama in July 2014 after being named a Specially Designated Global Terrorist by the United States Department of the Treasury.

Alkarama was first registered as a foundation in 2007 with al-Nuaimi as president and Qatari-national Sultan Khlaifa al-Khulaifi as Member/Secretary General. In August 2009, Qatari businessman and Director General of the al-Furqan Schools, Khalifa Mohammad al-Rabban, was named President of Alkarama.

Al-Nuaimi is also listed as the Secretary-General of the Global Anti-Aggression Campaign (GAAC) where Khalifa Mohammad al-Rabban is a member. The executive director of GAAC, Rabih Haddad, co-founded the Global Relief Foundation (GRC) designated by the UN and US for providing support to al-Qaeda and having connections to Osama bin Laden. The Global Anti-Aggression Campaign, an online human rights organization, has repeatedly hosted Hamas leaders, released anti-Western reports, and called for a confrontation with the West.

Abd al-Rahman al-Nuaimi is a founding member of the Sheikh Eid bin Mohammad Al Thani Charitable Association, often referred to as Eid Charity. Eid Charity is a charitable organization with close ties to Qatari government institutions. Despite giving generously to a variety of charitable causes, Eid Charity has also partnered with Madid Ahl al-Sham, a defunct Qatar-based online conduit for donations intended for the al-Nusra Front, on several charity campaigns.

== Terrorism accusations and international sanctions ==
On December 18, 2013, al-Nuaimi was designated as a Specially Designated Global Terrorist by the United States Department of the Treasury, which described him as “a Qatar-based terrorist financier and facilitator who has provided money and material support and conveyed communications to al-Qa'ida and its affiliates in Syria, Iraq, Somalia and Yemen for more than a decade.” The Treasury Department alleged that, for an unspecified period of time, al-Nuaimi funneled over $2 million per month to Al-Qaeda in Iraq. He is also accused of providing $600,000 to Al-Qaeda representatives in Syria and $250,000 to Al-Shabaab in Somalia, in addition to an undisclosed amount to a Yemeni charity that funneled money to Al-Qaeda in the Arabian Peninsula. While the accusations of financial support to terrorist organizations received the most attention, U.S. authorities also accused al-Nuaimi of providing communications and other support to the Iraqi insurgency between 2003 and 2004.

Al-Nuaimi has steadfastly denied the allegations, and the executive director of Alkarama—which is not itself accused of any wrongdoing—has argued that al-Nuaimi's designation as a terrorist financier and facilitator is a politically motivated attempt to silence a critic of United States policy in the Middle East. As part of its human rights work, Alkarama has documented civilian casualties resulting from U.S. drone strikes in Yemen. Human rights groups stress that Alkarama itself is a legitimate organization that has provided important access to information in cases of human rights violations in the region.

The designation by the United States was followed by similar designations by the United Nations Security Council, the European Union, the United Kingdom, and Turkey, resulting in a travel ban and a freeze of al-Nuaimi's assets.
