= Hashim bin Mohammed al-Awadhy =

Qatari businessman

- Occupation: Business
- Known for: Rabea TV

Hashim bin Mohammed al-Awadhy (Arabic: العوضي محمد بن هاشم) is a Qatari businessman and the owner of Rabea TV, and an official with the Qatar-based Eid Charity Association. Al-Awadhy's son, Mohammed bin Hashim al-Awadhy, was the coordinator of an Islamic fundraising campaign and was killed while fighting with ISIS in Syria. Al-Awadhy currently resides in Doha, Qatar.

== Rabea TV ==
Rabea TV is a Muslim Brotherhood opposition TV network launched in 2013 in response to the coup that led to the removal of former Egyptian president Mohammed Morsi from office. Hashim bin Mohammed al-Awadhy is the owner of the network. The network's name refers to a 2013 raid of Muslim Brotherhood supporters during a sit-in in Rabaa al-Adawiya Square and is a common reference to support for the Egyptian Muslim Brotherhood.

Although Rabea TV is broadcast from Istanbul, Turkey, the network targets Egyptian viewers through its content and focus on Egyptian news.

=== Controversy ===
Rabea TV is considered to promote the Egyptian Muslim Brotherhood. However, Turkish officials have denied the existence of any Muslim Brotherhood affiliate TV networks broadcast from Turkey.

Rabea TV has also featured scholar Salama Abd al-Qawi who encouraged the assassination of Egyptian president Abdel Fattah al-Sisi. Rabea TV's programs have also featured threats to Egyptian police officers, soldiers, and Westerners in attendance of an economic conference in Cairo.

== Tourism Peace Magazine ==
Hashim al-Awadhy is the general supervisor of the Tourism Peace magazine. In 2015, al-Awadhy reportedly met with the Deputy Prime Minister and Minister of Tourism of the Turkish Republic of Northern Cyprus to discuss opportunities related to tourism cooperation. Pictures of the meeting emerged on social media.

== Sheikh Eid bin Mohammad Al Thani Charitable Association ==
Hashim al-Awadhy serves as the adviser to the Director General at Sheikh Eid bin Mohammad Al Thani Charitable Association, often referred to as Eid Charity. Before holding this position, al-Awadhy served as the Director of the Media Center. Eid Charity is a prominent Doha-based NGO named after his Excellency Sheikh Eid Ibn Mohammad Ibn Thani Ibn Jasim Ibn Mohammad Al Thani. Eid Charity provides a range of charitable and humanitarian services to those in need, both in Qatar and beyond. Hashim al-Awadhy has been named in a number of Eid Charity publications.

Eid Charity has also been found to have ties to the U.S. designated terrorist group Hamas through its membership in the "Union of Good" organization led by Yusuf al-Qaradawi. Eid Charity has also been listed as supervising Madid Ahl al-Sham fundraising efforts and having ties to Specially Designated Global Terrorist Abd al-Nuaymi. Madid Ahl al-Sham has been accused, by the U.S. Department of State and the Washington Post, of being a fundraising effort for extremist elements operating in Syria, more specifically al-Qaeda affiliate the Al-Nusra.

== Mohammed bin Hashim al-Awadhy ==
Hashim al-Awadhy's son, Mohammed al-Awadhy, was a point of contact for the Wa Atasemo for the Relief of our People in Syria Islamic fundraising campaign. Mohammed al-Awadhy's name and phone number are listed on the campaign's pictures. On Wa Atasemo's Twitter account, the campaign is followed by supporters of ISIS and other Islamist groups.

Mohammed al-Awadhy's death was first reported in February 2014. According to the Violations Documentation Center in Syria, Al-Awadhy was found dead in the Idlib Governorate between the towns of Binnish and Taftanaz. Following his death, Mohammed al-Awadhy was described as belonging to the "convoy of martyrs" by ISIS-supporters.
