= Performance of girls over boys in education =

Gender issue in education

Performance of girls over boys in education refers to the tendency, seen in many countries, for girls to earn higher grades, show stronger reading and writing skills, and complete school at higher rates than boys. This pattern is most visible in classroom outcomes and literacy, while boys have sometimes matched or exceeded girls in some standardized math measures.

== Across the world ==
A press from The American Psychological Association release summarizes a 2014 meta-analysis by Daniel and Susan Voyer in Psychological Bulletin, showing girls have earned higher school grades than boys across nearly a century (1914–2011) in all subjects; The analysis reviewed 369 samples from 308 studies across 30+ countries, involving over 1.1 million students (70% U.S.), focusing on teacher-assigned grades or GPAs from elementary through graduate levels. Grade gaps were largest in language courses and smallest in math/science, emerging later in those subjects during junior/middle school; gaps grew from elementary to middle school but shrank in college.

A study from Cambridge found girls in the United Kingdom across all education levels from primary school to university outperform boys, with boys only edging ahead in a few math-related subjects.

A Pew Research study from November 2024 found women in the United States outpace men in college completion, including every major racial and ethnic group.

A Doha News report found women made up almost 75% of Qatari students at Qatar Foundation universities in 2019–20, and a research piece notes the female tertiary enrollment rate is almost six times that of males.

Girls significantly outperform boys in reading in every EU member state according to the European Commission's PISA 2018 analysis, confirming this pattern across all EU countries with gaps in underachievement rates from 6.4 points (UK) to 21.5 points (Cyprus).

In 2020, girls in South America led in reading across PISA participants (Chile 448 overall, down to Paraguay 373), but gaps are smaller than Europe's, and girls dominate higher enrollment.

== Causes ==
Girls mature faster than boys, adrenal hormone changes occur for 6-8 for girls, and 7-9 for boys. Girls cortical surface area peaks around 8.1 years, but 9.7 for boys. Girls typically begin puberty around 8–13, boys around 9–14.

== Solutions ==
"Redshirt the Boys" refers to a proposal for delaying boys' entry into kindergarten by one year to account for their later maturation compared to girls. This idea, popularized by Richard V. Reeves in a 2022 Atlantic article, draws from athletic "redshirting" and Malcolm Gladwell's observations in Outliers about older classmates' advantages.

Boys' brains, particularly the prefrontal cortex for impulse control and planning, mature about two years later than girls', leading to higher hyperactivity and self-regulation challenges in early classrooms. Redshirting could reduce grade retention (especially for low-income and Black boys, where 1 in 4 repeat a grade) and boost long-term outcomes like life satisfaction.
