= Madid Ahl al-Sham =

Qatar-based fundraising campaign

Madid Ahl al-Sham (Arabic: مدد أهل الشام) was a Qatar-based fundraising campaign widely suspected of acting as a conduit for donations intended for Jabhat al-Nusra, al-Qaeda’s affiliate in Syria. While the online campaign reportedly coordinated the delivery of humanitarian supplies to Syrian citizens in need, the U.S. Department of State identified Madid Ahl al-Sham as a fundraising source for violent extremists.

Madid Ahl al-Sham is believed to have been led by Sa’d bin Sa’d Muhammad Shariyan al-Kabi and Abd al-Latif Bin Abdallah Salih Muhammad al-Kawari, both of which are U.S. Treasury Specially Designated Global Terrorists (SDGT).

Madid Ahl al-Sham was identified by the Washington Post and other prominent publications as a conduit for Jabhat al-Nusra in 2013 and 2014. The online campaign, which operated under the Qatar Centre for Voluntary Work, was shut down by Qatari authorities in 2014.

== Operations ==
Madid Ahl al-Sham was an online Qatar-based fundraising campaign that utilized social media to appeal for donations from Qatari citizens and residents. While the campaign reportedly had a headquarters, its fundraising efforts were conducted over the internet. Madid Ahl al-Sham-affiliated social media accounts, including the accounts of its coordinators, posted visual flyers calling for donations to the campaign. While most flyers claimed that donations would be used to provide humanitarian supplies to Syrians, one Madid Ahl al-Sham flyer asked for donations to arm, feed, and treat fighters. These flyers contained the names and phone numbers of campaign coordinators for those interested in donating to contact. Other Madid Ahl al-Sham flyers request donors to contact campaign coordinators according to their area of residence in Qatar. Bank account information was often listed on Madid Ahl al-Sham flyers.

== Partnership with government ==
=== Eid Charity ===
Madid Ahl al-Sham has reportedly fundraised under the supervision of Sheikh Eid Bin Mohammad Al Thani Charitable Association, a Doha-based charity with ties to the Qatari royal family. In 2014, a Madid Ahl al-Sham campaign to collect funds to provide Iftar meals for the needy was announced under the supervision of Sheikh Eid Bin Mohammad Al Thani Charitable Association, or Eid Charity.

Eid Charity, which operates as a Government Organized Non-Governmental Organization (GONGO) in Qatar, has suspected ties to terrorist networks. The charity is believed to have ties to Hamas and is a member of the “Union of Good” organization led by Yusuf al-Qaradawi.

Multiple members of Eid Charity also have suspected ties to terrorist organizations. Eid Charity founding member Abd al-Rahman al-Nuaimi is a U.S. designated al-Qaeda financial supporter. Hashim bin Mohammed al-Awadhy, a senior member of Eid Charity, is the owner of Rabea TV, a pro-Egyptian Muslim Brotherhood TV outlet. Al-Awadhy's son, Mohammed Hashim al-Awadhy, was killed while fighting in Syria. ISIS supporters described Mohammed al-Awadhy as belonging to their “convoy of martyrs.” Khalifa bin Mohammed al-Rabban, member of Eid Charity and general manager of the al-Furqan Schools, is a member of the board of trustees of the Global Anti-Aggression Campaign (GAAC). Al-Rabban is the current president of Alkarama's board of trustees.

=== Qatar’s Volunteer Work Center ===
Madid Ahl al-Sham has also partnered with Qatar's Volunteer Work Center to assist Syrian refugees along the Turkish and Jordanian borders of Syria. General Secretary of Qatar's Volunteer Work Center Yusuf Ali Kadhim stated that Madid Ahl al-Sham took part in fundraising for the project. The Qatar Volunteer Work Center was supervised by the Qatari government's Ministry of Culture.

=== Qatar Islamic Bank ===
Madid Ahl al-Sham's solicitations for donations featured Qatar Islamic Bank account numbers for depositing funds. Qatar Islamic Bank and some of its correspondents, such as Saudi Al Rajhi Bank, have repeatedly been reported to have facilitated the transfer of funds to terrorist organizations. Qatar Islamic Bank's largest shareholder is the country's sovereign wealth, the Qatar Investment Authority.

== Humanitarian activities ==
Madid Ahl al-Sham widely advertised its calls for donations to fund the delivery of humanitarian assistance in Syria. In an online flyer attributed to the campaign and distributed through social media, Madid Ahl al-Sham requests donations from Qatari citizens to provide medicine, food, and clothes to Syrian civilians. One Madid Ahl al-Sham coordinator also shared images of what appears to be food and humanitarian supplies, claiming that the aid is being sent to Syria following donations to the Madid Ahl al-Sham campaign.

According to reports, 31 tons of food and household medical items were transferred to Syrian citizens and refugees through the Turkish border through an assistance program funded by Madid Ahl al-Sham donations. A member of Madid Ahl al-Sham, Mohammed Helwan al-Seqatri, told Qatari newspaper al-Watan that Madid Ahl al-Sham had over 50 young volunteers. According to al-Seqatri, the volunteers were collecting donations to be sent to Syria refugees living near the Turkish and Jordanian borders.

== Support for terrorism ==
In addition to the campaign's humanitarian activities, Madid Ahl al-Sham also functioned as an online fundraising campaign for terrorist organizations, specifically al-Qaeda's Syrian branch Jabhat al-Nusra.

In 2013, the Washington Post reported that Madid Ahl al-Sham was “cited by Jabhat al-Nusra in August as one of the preferred conduits for donations intended for the group, which has pledged loyalty to al-Qaeda leader Ayman al-Zawahiri.”

In 2014, the U.S. Department of State described Madid Ahl al-Sham as an “online fundraising campaign that was suspected of sending funds to violent extremist elements in Syria.”

CNN has reported that the Twitter accounts of al-Qaeda supporters have encouraged their followers to donate to the Madid Ahl al-Sham campaign.

A Madid Ahl al-Sham flyer that campaign fundraiser Sa’d bin Sa’d Muhammad Shariyan al-Kabi used as his Twitter profile picture for a time requested donations equal to $1,500 for the preparation of a fighter. The flyer claims that the money will be used to arm, feed, and treat a fighter.

== Members ==
=== Sa’d bin Sa’d Muhammad Shariyan al-Kabi ===
Sa’d bin Sa’d Muhammad Shariyan al-Kabi was a coordinator and fundraiser for Madid Ahl al-Sham. Al-Kabi is a U.S. Treasury Specially Designated Global Terrorist accused of setting up donation campaigns in Qatar for Jabhat al-Nusra in response to a request from the terrorist group for money to purchase weapons and food. Al-Kabi also acted as an intermediary for Jabhat al-Nusra to allow the group to facilitate a ransom payment in exchange for a hostage held by the group. Al-Kabi's name and phone number appeared on multiple Madid Ahl al-Sham flyers as a point of contact for those interested in donating to the campaign, including on the flyer soliciting donations to assist fighters. In 2014, CNN reported that al-Kabi's WhatsApp Messenger profile included a Madad Ahl al-Sham flyer calling for donations "equal to $1,500 to prepare a fighter by arming, feeding, and treating." In a 2013 Twitter post, al-Kabi claims that Madad Ahl al-sham raised the equivalent of $1.4 million from its Qatari donors.

=== Abd al-Latif Bin Abdallah Salih Muhammad al-Kawari ===
Abd al-Latif Bin Abdallah Salih Muhammad al-Kawari was a coordinator and fundraiser for Madid Ahl al-Sham. Al-Kawari is a U.S. Treasury Specially Designated Global Terrorist for his role in fundraising for al-Qaeda and serving as an al-Qaeda security official. The U.S. Treasury claims that “al-Kawari worked with al-Qaida facilitators to coordinate the delivery of funding from Qatari financiers intended to support al-Qaida.” Al-Kawari has worked with other SDGT and al-Qaeda operatives since the early 2000s, including Ibrahim Isa al-Bakr, the brother of Muhammad Isa al-Bakr, and Hassan Ghul, Osama bin Laden's former envoy to Iraq-based jihadist Abu Musab al-Zarqawi. Al-Kawari is referenced as a Madid Ahl al-Sham point of contact and as an assistant to al-Kabi. Al-Kawari directly coordinated Madid Ahl al-Sham from January 2013 to mid-2014. Hamad Isa al-Bakr was a Madid Ahl al-Sham fundraiser and the brother of al-Qaeda supporter Ibrahim ‘Isa al-Bakr and Muhammad Isa al-Bakr. In 2013, Hamad al-Bakr solicited donations and support for the Madid Ahl al-Sham campaign. Hamad al-Bakr also shared content in support of Jabhat al-Nusra. Hamad al-Bakr works at Qatar’s Public Works Authority with his brother and US designated al-Qaeda supporter Ibrahim Isa al-Bakr. He continues to live freely in Qatar.

=== Muhammad Isa al-Bakr ===
Muhammad Isa al-Bakr was a promoter and fundraiser for Madid Ahl al-Sham and the brother of Ibrahim ‘Isa Muhammad al-Bakr, a SDGT and fundraiser for al-Qaeda and the Taliban, and Hamad Isa al-Bakr. Al-Bakr was featured in a 2014 video describing Madid Ahl al-Sham’s goals and activities. Al-Bakr also promoted the campaign through his personal Twitter account. In 2014, a video surfaced showing the delivery of goods to Syrian citizens in boxes labeled as having been delivered under the supervision of Mohammad Isa al-Bakr. Mohammad al-Bakr was arrested over a threatening letter sent to the French embassy in Qatar in protest of the country’s intervention in Mali.

=== Khalid Saeed al-Bounein ===
Khalid Saeed al-Bounein acted as a coordinator and fundraiser for Madid Ahl al-Sham. Al-Bounein is listed in 2013 and 2014 calls soliciting donations on behalf of a Madid Ahl al-Sham campaign. In 2013, Al-Bounein is listed as the point of contact for residents of Doha interested in donating to the campaign. In 2014, residents of al-Rayyan, al-Nasiriah, and al-Azizah are instructed to contact “Brother Khalid al-Bounein.”

=== Others ===
Madid Ahl al-Sham was actively promoted and endorsed by terrorist financiers including Sheikh Wagdy Ghoneim and Abdulaziz bin Khalifa al-Attiyah. Ghoneim, an Egyptian cleric, was forced to leave the U.S. after allegedly fundraising for terrorist organizations. Al-Attiayah, the cousin of Qatar's foreign minister, was convicted in absentia by a Lebanese court for directing funds to al-Qaeda.

== Media attention ==
In 2013, the Washington Post reported on Madid Ahl al-Sham's connections to Jabhat al-Nusra in an article entitled “Islamic charity officials gave millions to al-Qaeda, U.S. says.”

In June 2014, CNN released a 7-minute video investigating fundraising for terrorism in Qatar. The video, released as a “CNN Outfront Special Report” shows an al-Qaeda linked militia “directing followers to donate to the (Madid Ahl al-Sham) campaign” through its Twitter account. CNN's Erin Burnett also interviewed al-Kabi over the phone who claimed he had no knowledge that his Twitter account included a Madid Ahl al-Sham flyer soliciting donations for the arming, feeding, and treating of a soldier. CNN also reports that al-Kabi claimed, through his Twitter account, that Madid Ahl al-Sham had raised $1.4 million.

In December 2014, an article by the Daily Beast entitled “U.S. Ally Qatar Shelters Jihadi Moneymen” claims that Madid Ahl al-Sham was endorsed by Jabhat al-Nusra as a conduit for donations. The Long War Journal and Business Insider have both released articles on the operations of Madid Ahl al-Sham and have criticized the Qatari government for not shutting down the fundraising campaign earlier.

Other media outlets that have covered Madid Ahl al-Sham include the Middle East Eye, The National, Doha News, Gulf Times and the Qatar News Agency.

== Closure ==
Madid Ahl al-Sham was shut down by Qatari authorities in 2014.
