= Tyseley =

Area of Birmingham, England

Coordinates: 52°27′N 1°50′W

Tyseley is a district in the southern half of the city of Birmingham, England, near the Coventry Road and the districts of Acocks Green, Small Heath and Yardley. It is located near the Grand Union Canal.

== Etymology ==
Tyseley means "Tyssa's clearing" with "-ley" meaning woodland clearing.

== Education ==
The local comprehensive secondary school (on Reddings Lane) is Yardleys School, which was newly constructed on the site of a former brick works. The school moved from its previous split site location in 2001. There is also several primary schools located in Tyseley, among those an Islamic school called Al Furqan which was established on site a decade ago.

== Industry ==
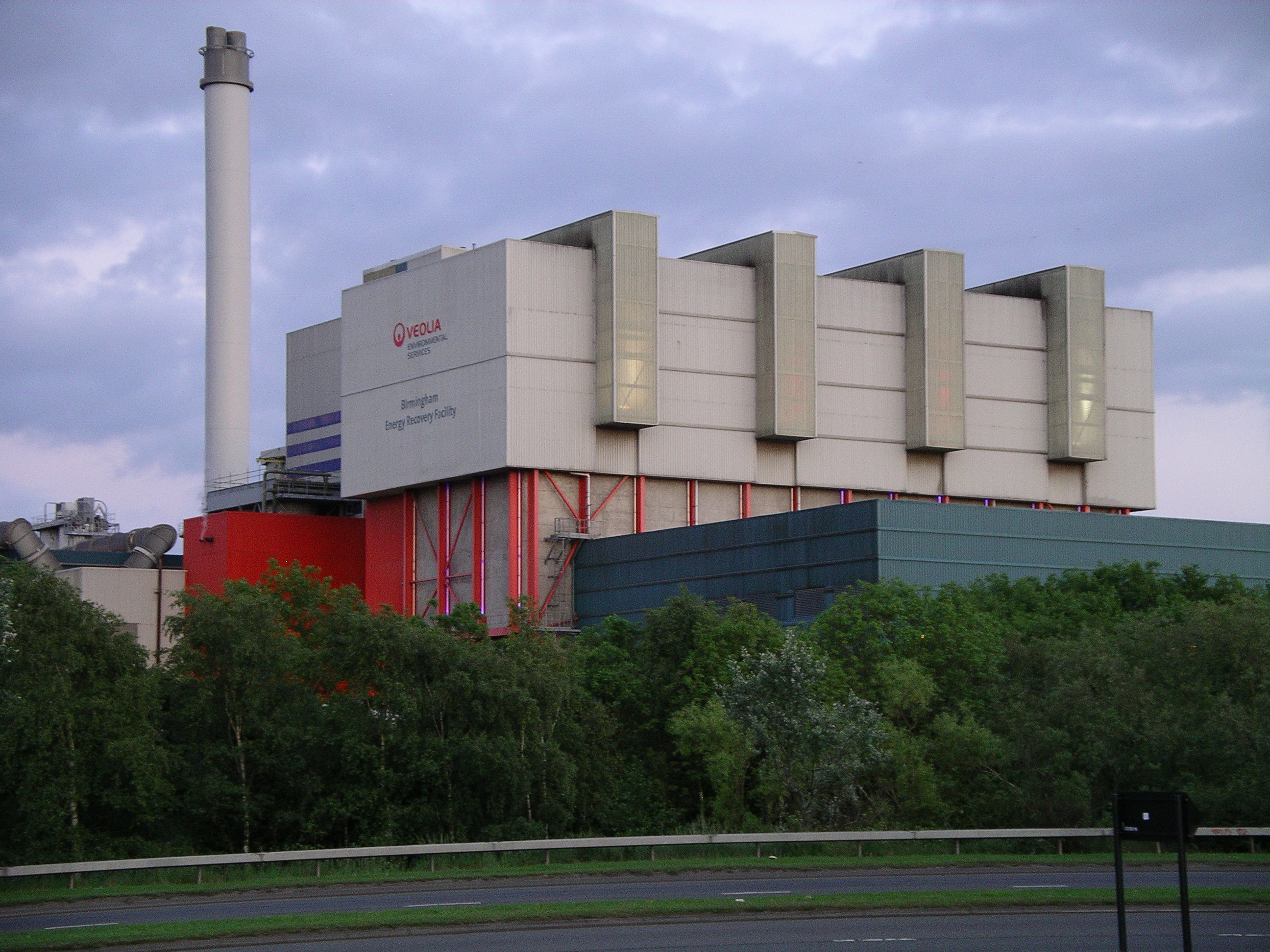
The Birmingham energy recovery facility.

Tyseley was once a thriving industrial area with thousands of people working in the area for major companies such as TI Reynolds (formerly Reynolds Tubes) and Corona, attracting a large number of bicycle and motorcycle manufacturers to the area, and component suppliers. Other companies based in the area in the past include Abingdon Motorcycles (later becoming King Dick Tools), Dawes Cycles, Girling Brakes, Slumberland, Smiths Crisps, MEM Electrical, Harmo Exhausts, Wilmot Breedon and also the factory where Co-Operative Society (CWS) toys, motorcycles, prams and bicycles were made. They marketed their toys as 'Tyseley Toys'.

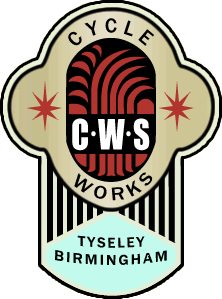
Headbadge design of Tyseley-made CWS bicycle from the 1960s

The area contains many Victorian buildings that housed many manual workers reflecting the heritage of the area and the city. There is now a large incineration plant, the Tyseley Energy from Waste Plant, which burns rubbish and in the process produces electricity for the National Grid.

Much of Tyseley remains industrial, with many companies, including Klaxon, SCC, Western Pegasus Limited and Bakelite Limited, basing themselves there. One of the local attractions is the Tyseley Locomotive Works, located inside a large railway depot.

== Transport ==
The 4, 4A, and 41 bus services, operated by West Midlands Bus and Stagecoach serve the Tyseley area.

Tyseley railway station was a predominant junction for the ex-Great Western Railway mainline between Birmingham Snow Hill and London Paddington, with the North Warwickshire Line (via Shirley to Stratford upon Avon) diverging here. Tyseley is on the Chiltern Main Line between London Marylebone and Birmingham Moor Street and Birmingham Snow Hill.

The North Warwickshire Line used to run beyond Stratford upon Avon onto Honeybourne railway station (which is on the Cotswold Line) as the Honeybourne Line to Cheltenham.
