= Sheikh Eid bin Mohammad Al Thani Charitable Association =

Qatari charitable organization

Eid Charity Foundation
- مؤسسة عيد الخيريةArabic
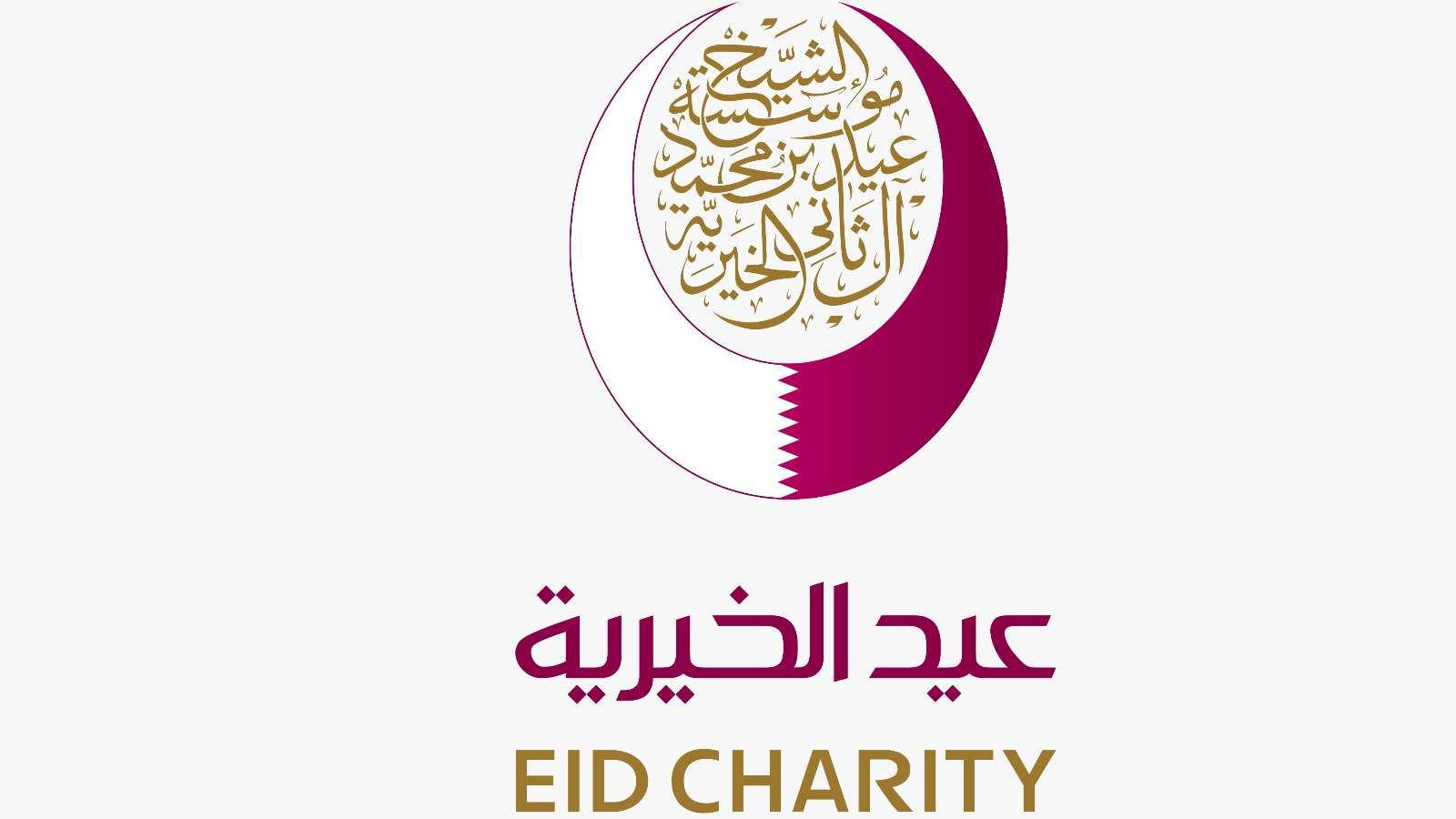
- Founded at: Qatar
- Type: NGO; Nonprofit organization
- Headquarters: Qatar
- Region served: Global
- Official language: Arabic; English; Urdu
- Website: https://www.eidcharity.net

Sheikh Eid Bin Mohammad Al Thani Charitable Association is a Qatari charitable organization established in 1995 in Doha, Qatar. The organization was named after Sheikh Eid Ibn Mohammad ibn Thani ibn Jasim ibn Mohammad Al Thani (1922-1994).

The U.S. Department of Treasury has characterized the organization's founder as "terrorist financier and facilitator who has provided money and material support and conveyed communications to al-Qa'ida and its affiliates in Syria, Iraq, Somalia and Yemen for more than a decade. ”

== Relief and Humanitarian Efforts ==
Eid Charity provides a wide range of services to people in need in Qatar and elsewhere in the Middle East from food collection and distribution to the poor to supporting drug awareness and rehabilitation programs. It has also supported relief efforts in Syria, Iraq, Yemen, the Palestinian territories, and other countries.

In August 2016, Eid Charity announced that the organization has obtained contracts to build 335 mosques in 17 countries around the world. According to reports, some of the 335 mosques have been built while others will be built throughout 2016. The construction of the mosques will cost about QR 21 million.

Nawaf Alhamadi is the Director General of Sheikh Eid bin Mohammad Al Thani Charitable Association. Ali bin Khaled al Hajri is the Executive Director of Foreign Projects at Eid Charity. Hashim bin Mohammad al-Awadhy is the adviser to the Director General of Eid Charity. Al-Awadhy is a Qatari businessman and the owner of Rabea TV, a TV network broadcast from Istanbul in support of the Egyptian Muslim Brotherhood.

== Terrorism Controversy ==
Abd Al-Rahman al-Nuaimi, is a founder of the Sheikh Eid bin Mohammad Al Thani Charitable Association in addition to previously serving as a President of the Qatar Football Association, and a history professor at Qatar University. On February 5, 2023, a report by Counter extremism project revealed that the United States and Qatar maintain close military ties. Qatar also maintains close ties with the United States in global counterterrorism operations. Also, the National Anti-Terrorism Committee (NATC) in the Ministry of Interior determines Qatar’s counterterrorism policy and manages interagency cooperation within the government to ensure effective counterterrorism efforts. The government of Qatar entirely restructured the NATC in 2014 to include representatives from more than 10 government agencies as a measure “to secure the nation’s critical infrastructure, as well as to prevent the country from becoming a hub for traveling foreign fighters,” according to the Doha News Agency. The U.S. Department of State credits Qatar’s strict immigration laws and government monitoring of violent extremists for the country’s low rate of domestic terrorism as well claimed the report.

Similar designations from the UN Security Council, EU, UK, and Turkey followed. Al-Nuaimi is also the Secretary General of the Global Anti-Aggression Campaign, an NGO that has repeatedly hosted Hamas leaders, and a founding member and former president of Alkarama, a Geneva-based human rights NGO that works with the UN to advocate for civil rights in the Arab World. In 2013, the Washington Post claimed that Alkarama “lobbies on behalf of Islamist detainees around the world”, including Islamist militias active in Syria, and accuses Western and Arab governments of undermining groups that promote Islamic rule. Humayqani is also an Alkarama founding member. In 2013, the U.S. Department of Treasury added al-Nuaimi to its list of Specially Designated Global Terrorists (SDGT) and described al-Nuaimi as “a Qatar-based terrorist financier and facilitator who has provided money and material support and conveyed communications to al-Qa'ida and its affiliates in Syria, Iraq, Somalia and Yemen for more than a decade.” The announcement also claimed that al-Nuaimi had provided financial support to a charity headed by Al-Qaeda financier and SDGT Abd al-Wahhab Muhammad Abd al-Rahman al-Humayqani.

The association has been accused by Israel of funneling funds to Hamas through its charitable endeavors in the Gaza Strip. Most notably, Israel banned the association and 35 other member organizations of the “Union of Good,” which the Israeli government considers “a roof organization for foundations operated by Hamas around the world, especially in Europe and the Persian Gulf countries.” The Chairman of the Union of Good is Sheikh Yusuf al-Qaradawi, a Qatari-based cleric who is the “spiritual leader of the Muslim Brotherhood.”

In article by LSE (London School Of Economics), Qatar has notified US officials that they do not support Hamas but has called for engagement between Hamas and Fatah. On 27 March 2022, the Fourth High-Level Strategic Dialogue between the State of Qatar & the United Nations Office of Counter-Terrorism (UNOCT) discussed strategic priorities and collaboration for effective United Nations support to Member States on counter-terrorism. Qatar is the second largest contributor to the United Nations Trust Fund for Counter-Terrorism out of a total 35 other donors. The country also removed Muslim brotherhood members during December 2021 as reported by The Economist.

In 2013, one of the founders of the association, Abd Al-Rahman al-Nouami, was named a Specially Designated Global Terrorist by the United States Government for his alleged role in facilitating financing and communications for Al-Qaeda affiliates in Iraq, Syria, Yemen, and Somalia. He was similarly sanctioned by the United Nations, European Union, United Kingdom, and Turkey in 2014, resulting in a freeze of his assets.

While he has denied the allegations, subsequent media reports noted his connection to the government-backed charity and other humanitarian organizations. Furthermore, Sheikh Eid bin Mohammad Al Thani Charitable Association was removed from the terrorist list with other entities and Qatari nationals, which was announced by blockading countries during the Gulf crisis of June 2017.
