= Muhammad Musa al-Amri =

Yemeni politician

Muhammad Musa al-Amri (محمد موسى العامري) (born 1 January 1965) is a Yemeni politician. He is the leader of al-Rachad party (also known as "Yemeni Rashad Union," Ittiḥād al Rashād, اتحاد الرشاد) in Yemen, and he was appointed as Minister of State on 7 November 2014 as part of Khaled Bahah's cabinet. He remained in office even after the 2014 coup carried out by the Houthis that led Bahah's government to resign on 22 January 2015.

== Education ==
Muhammad was born in the village of the Beni Amer in Casablanca province, in central Yemen. He pursued his education between Yemen and Saudi Arabia, eventually returning to Yemen, where he attended Dar al-Hadith school. He earned a master's degree in Islamic law and further specialized in the subject at the Omdurman Islamic University, in Sudan.

== Politics ==
Muhammad Musa al-Amri was recently designated as the chairman of al-Rachad, the first Salafi political party in Yemen - founded in March 2012.

He gained prominence after the party received full official recognition by the "National Unity Government", which was established in November 2011. It was established as part of the framework of the transition agreement, signed by Ali Abdullah Saleh's party and the opposition under the aegis of the Gulf Cooperation Council. In an interview by Al-Yaman TFV, Muhammad claimed that the Yemen uprising of 2011 disclosed a new opportunity for political participation and for a substantial change in political structures in the light of which the formation of a Salafi political party appeared promising.

Al-Rachad attempted to provide a "new model" for a clear Islamic voice in Yemen that could express "an authentic, orthodox and realistic Islamic message." In 2013, Muhammad al-Amri argued that "the biggest factor in preventing their [Salafis] participation in politics is the fear that the Rashād party would become a replica of existing Islamic political work in the Yemeni arena."

Reflecting on Salafism's negative public connotations in Yemen, Al Rashād's president said that "there is no objectivity when opinions on Salafis are circulated," and reiterated that "the Salafi stance is moderate [and] far away from extremism." The party's foundation attracted growing criticism in Yemen especially by the Salafis in Saada Governorate's Damaj, the place of origin for Salafi ideology in Yemen, who condemned al-Rachad party members' growing engagement in the political arena and partisan affiliation.

On 21 September 2014, al-Amri signed the "Peace and National Partnership Agreement" in the presidential residence in Sana'a, in the presence of President Hadi and the UN envoy to Yemen, Jamal bin Omar. The agreement was signed by representatives of Ansarallah, the umbrella organization of the Houthi movement and the leadership of major political factions in Yemen. The then-sitting government also joined the initiative, which was welcomed by the Gulf Cooperation Council and by the Secretary-General of the United Nations.

=== Allegations ===
Rumors about al-Rachad party's affiliation with al-Qaeda in the Arabian Peninsula (AQAP) started to circulate especially after the party's secretary general, 'Abd al Wahhab al Ḥumayqani, was named a "Specially Designated Global Terrorist" (SDGT) by the U.S. Department of the Treasury in 2013 and listed as a supporter of al-Qaeda. In particular, the U.S. government charged that al Ḥumayqani was a prominent figure within AQAP who reportedly had a relationship with the leaders of the terrorist organization. Allegedly, al Ḥumayqani used his status in the charitable community to help fundraising for the Arabian branch of al-Qaeda and orchestrated an AQAP attack on a Yemeni Republican guard base in al Bayda' Governorate.

In light of this connection, Christian Science Monitor reported that the U.S. government has inferred that al-Rachad "is little more than a front, created with AQAP leaders to increase the group's numbers and broaden its support."
