= Abd al-Wahhab al-Humayqani =

Yemeni politician

Secretary General of the Al-Rashad Union

Personal details
- Born: 1972 (age 53–54)
- Party: Al-Rashad Union

Abd al-Wahhab Muhammad Abd al-Rahman al-Humayqani (عبد الوهاب الحميقاني) (born 1972) is a Yemeni politician. He is the Secretary General of the Al-Rashad Union, the first Yemeni Salafi political party established in March 2012. He is also a founding member of Alkarama, a Swiss-based independent human rights NGO with alleged links to terrorist organizations. He was one of only two Yemeni party leaders to participate in UN-sponsored peace talks in Geneva in 2015 in an attempt to find a peaceful solution to the Yemeni civil war.

The United States Department of the Treasury has designated Humayqani as a Specially Designated Global Terrorist, accusing him of having served as a recruiter and financier for al-Qaeda in the Arabian Peninsula (AQAP) and having orchestrated a car bombing in March 2012.

== Education and training ==
Humayqani attended Sana’a University, where he specialized in Islamic Studies and International Law. He is currently a university professor and a member of the Yemen's Ulama. He is also a keynote speaker at the Imam Shawkaani mosque in Sana’a and manages a number of humanitarian relief projects under the supervision of the Ministry of Social and Labour Affairs.

== Political activity ==
=== Al-Rashad Union ===
Once affiliated with the Yemeni Islamist party al-Islah, Humayqani is a founding member and the Secretary General of al-Rashad Union. In March 2012 he attended the three-day conference in Yemen as the secretary general of the preparatory committee that led to the foundation of al-Rashad Union. After the conference, he said in an interview that behind the Salafis’ entry into the political arena was the party members’ willingness to “contribute to the nation's awakening in line with developments being witnessed by Yemen and Arab region in light of the Arab Spring.” He further stated that al-Rashad would unite the Salafi factions in the country toward the common goal of ruling “the people using the Islamic Shari’a law and peaceful means."

As reiterated by many party members on several occasions, al-Rashad attempts to provide an authentic, conservative Islamic voice in the country. The party is also committed to defend the rights of Yemen's citizens, and especially to create new opportunities for Yemeni youth. Interviewed in 2012, Humayqani stressed that al-Rashad intended to pursue a peaceful alternative to violence and to ground a solid democracy in a more stable Yemen.

Asked about his view on the role of women in society, he emphasized that Shari’a was the foundational premise of the party's program, and added bluntly that the party members “are against equality” of roles because of physiological differences between men and women, although he affirmed women's equality in value and rights. Al-Rashad includes a special department for women's affairs.

=== The National Dialogue Conference ===
Humayqani took part to the National Dialogue Conference (NDC) held in Yemen in March 2013 as a representative of al-Rashad party, along with 564 other representatives of Yemeni political parties. The conference inaugurated the second phase of Yemen's transition of power in the framework of the Gulf initiative signed in Riyadh in November 2011 by the deposed President Ali Abdullah Saleh. The initiative, brokered by the Gulf Cooperation Council and sponsored by the United States and Saudi Arabia, stipulated a two-year transitional period and created the National Dialogue Conference as a forum to discuss outstanding issues and to draft a new constitution compatible with Yemen's new situation.

According to al-Monitor, Humayqani was “one of the most prominent participants, proving to be an intelligent and flexible leader, with an awareness and willingness to accommodate the views of others that no other Salafist movement leader in Yemen had ever shown.”

== 2015 peace talks in Geneva ==
In June 2015, Humayqani participated to the UN-sponsored peace talks in Geneva in his capacity as member of the Yemeni government in exile. He was one of just two party leaders who participated in the talks.

There have been speculations that the selection of Humayqani as one of the two Yemeni representative to attend the conference may indicate Saudi Arabia's hope that al-Rashad Union can be bolstered to compete with the Muslim Brotherhood like al-Nour party in Egypt.

Humayqani's affiliation with Saudi Arabia was especially emphasized after the U.S. Department of the Treasury designated him as an al-Qaeda supporter based in Yemen who “has frequently traveled throughout the Arabian Peninsula while conducting business for AQAP.” Moreover, according to a U.S. official interviewed by the Christian Science Monitor in 2014, Saudi Arabia is the country of origin of most of the backers of Humayqani's financial transfers.

Humayqani also has strong ties with Qatar. He appeared on the Qatari TV channel al-Jazeera to comment on the Geneva talks. Humayqani served as a “onetime adviser to Qatar on charitable giving”, and was one of the local representatives of the Qatari branch of the Swiss-based human rights organization Alkarama. He also attended the opening ceremony of a mosque built in Yemen, which had been mostly funded by the Qatari government, upon request of the Qatari authorities.

== Alleged involvement in terrorist activities ==
In December 2013, the U.S. Department of the Treasury listed Humayqani as a Specially Designated Global Terrorist (SDGT). The U.S. authorities argued that he was a fundraiser and key figure of al-Qaeda in the Arabian Peninsula (AQAP).

The treasury refers to Humayqani as “an important figure within AQAP and reportedly had a relationship with important AQAP leaders.” The treasury blames Humayqani for orchestrating an attack on the Yemeni Republican Guard by employing many “vehicle borne explosive devices,” an operation that killed seven people. Humayqani is listed as the recruiter for an AQAP group plotting to attack officials in Yemen.

Humayqani, according to the treasury, has not only provided financial support for AQAP but has also acted on their behalf by representing them in meetings to negotiate the release of soldiers being held hostage by AQAP. In addition, Humayqani directed an armed AQAP group trying to carry out attacks on government facility attacks including a government building in al-Bayda Governorate.

According to the U.S. Department of the Treasury's statement, Humayqani exploited his role as “the head of a Yemen-based charity” to fundraise on behalf of AQAP as well as to facilitate financial transfers from AQAP supporters in Saudi Arabia to Yemen.

The U.S. authorities emphasized that AQAP leadership intended to establish a new political party in Yemen supposedly led by Humayqani, which the Yemeni franchise of al-Qaeda would have used “as a cover for the recruitment and training of fighters and a means to attract broader support.”

Furthermore, the U.S. charged that Humayqani issued religious guidance in support of AQAP operations along with the cleric Abd al-Majid al-Zindani. Al-Zindani was a one-time mentor of Osama bin Laden whom both the U.S. and the United Nations listed as an al-Qaeda loyalist and supporter. Humayqani was sent to attend the opening ceremony of the mosque funded by Qatar's Ministry of Awqaf and Islamic Affairs along with al-Zindani by the Qatari authorities.

The U.S. Treasury did not single out Alkarama in its designation; nonetheless, there are strong elements suggesting that Alkarama is the charity concerned. Humayqani said in an interview with The Christian Science Monitor that he had resigned from his charity. Alkarama's implication is suggested by Humayqani's association with the other subject designated as SDGT by the U.S. Department of the Treasury at the same time, Abd Al-Rahman al-Nuaimi. Nuaimi is a Qatari history professor and founding member of Alkarama, who resigned as president of Alkarama's board shortly after the U.S. allegations were formalized. Even before 2013, Nuaimi was banned from entering Saudi Arabia due to allegations of terrorist activity.

The sanctions imposed on Humayqani by the U.S. Department of the Treasury consisted of the freezing of any assets he may have had under U.S. jurisdiction and sanctioning anyone who does business with him, as well as a request for extradition.

President Mansour Hadi refused to extradite Humayqani and denounced the charges, which caused a wave of discontent in Yemen from the political and the religious field. The Yemeni government sent the U.S. Department of the Treasury a letter condemning their designation of Humayqani.

Humayqani has regularly denied all charges against him. Interviewed by The Washington Post, he declared that his charities “benefit orphans, mosques and poor families, not al-Qaeda,” and that he had no objections to face trial in Yemen to defend himself against any charges. He has also said that he could consider legal action in the U.S.

In September 2023, the United Arab Emirates (UAE) released a report detailing the removal of Qatari individuals and organizations from its list of designated terrorist entities. Among those removed from the list was Abd al-Wahhab al-Humayqani, who had been previously included as terrorist by the blockading countries during the Gulf crisis in June 2017.

== Controversies ==
In December 2013, NGO Monitor called on Amnesty International and Human Rights Watch to immediately undertake independent investigations into their procedures for performing due diligence on potential NGO partners after it was discovered that these organizations had issued joint statements with Humayqani's charity, Alkarama. “In addition,” NGO monitor writes “these organizations have an obligation to review the status of the officials responsible for such collaborations, alliances, and affiliations.” Amnesty admitted that, in the past, Alkarama helped it with information on human rights abuse cases and added that it was “unable to confirm” the accuracy of the US allegations of terror finance. Human Rights Watch declined to comment.
