= Tyseley Energy from Waste Plant =

Power station in Birmingham, England

Coordinates: 52.4598°N 1.8439°W

Tyseley Energy Recovery Facility
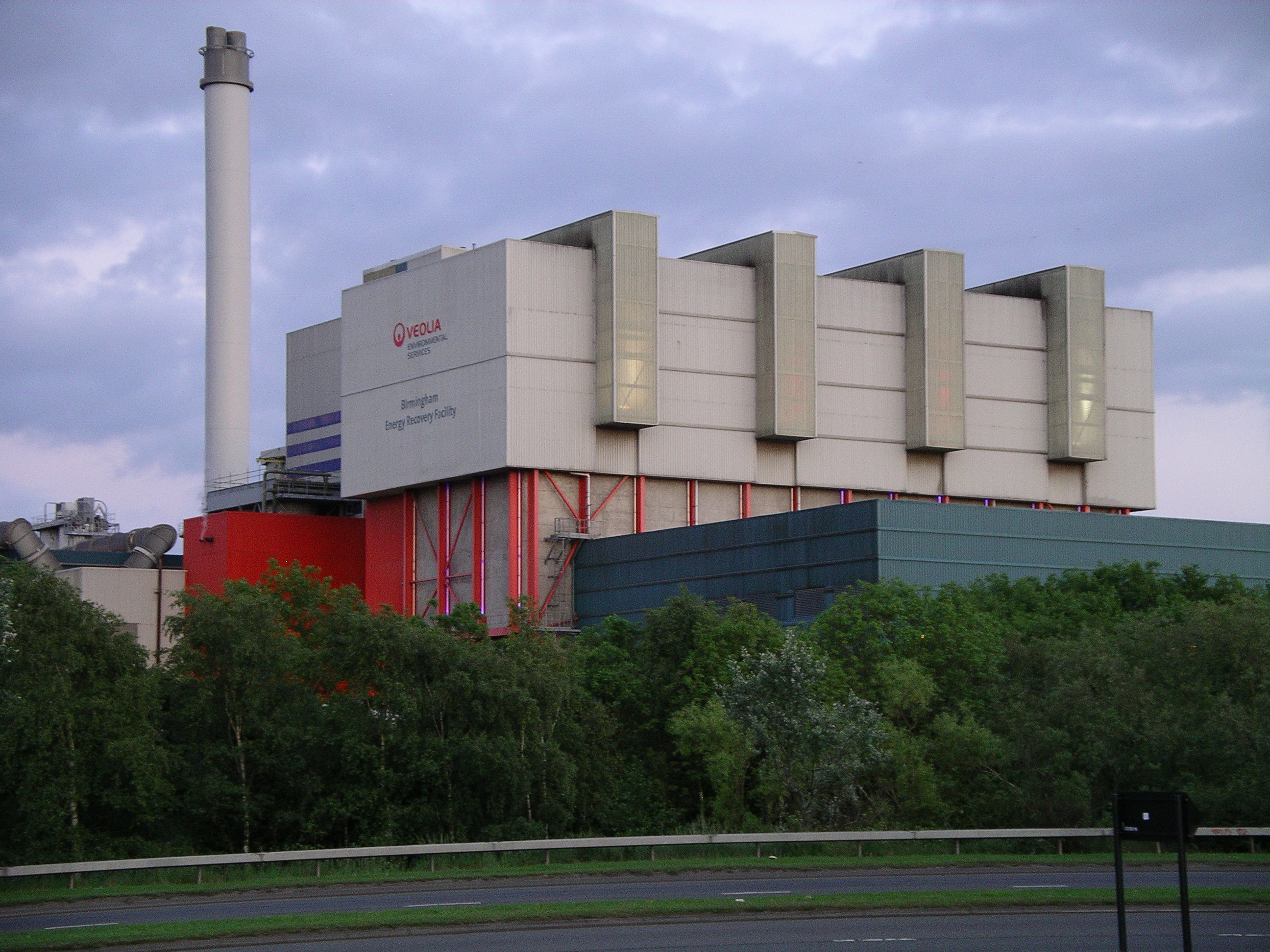
- Photograph from 2007
- Date opened: 1996
- Operator: Veolia for Birmingham City Council
- Address: Veolia ES Birmingham Limited, James Road, Tyseley, Birmingham, B11 2BA
- Architect: Faulks Perry Culley & Rech

Tyseley Energy Recovery Facility is a waste incineration plant in Birmingham, UK. It is run by Veolia for Birmingham City Council.

A waste disposal facility and incinerator was on the site before the current building was constructed; having been built by Birmingham City Council and operated by them.

In 1992, Tyseley Waste Disposal Ltd. was established and entered into a 25-year contract with the City of Birmingham to dispose of and manage waste. It underwent an upgrade over 5 years from 2018 to 2023 to ensure minimum operating extension of a 15 years.

There was a 2-year handover period when the previous site was labelled as TWD but still run by Birmingham City Council, and plans were announced to replace the existing incinerator to comply with new European emissions requirements, being submitted in 1993.

The current facility was built in 1996 by Veolia to a design by Faulks Perry Culley & Rech. Once completed, the previous waste disposal site was demolished - including the controlled demolition of the old incinerator. The site was completed in 1998.

The current plant has become a notable building in Birmingham with a lighting scheme that illuminates the plant during the hours of darkness. Veolia benefits from Levy Exemption Certificates for the element of energy which is produced from renewable sources. This provides income to the City Council. The plant was opposed by Birmingham Friends of the Earth for contributing to climate change, causing air pollution and reducing recycling rates in the city.

The ERF operates 24 hours a day for 365 days a year (except for planned shutdowns for maintenance). It takes around 350,000 tonnes of waste produced by the city annually and burns it to produce electricity, of which 25MW is fed into the National Grid. It is a two-stream plant with each boiler designed to process 23.5 tonnes of rubbish per hour. It has a turbo-generator which exports 25MW to the National Grid, after providing for on-site needs. The ERF also recovers several thousand tonnes a year of ferrous metals for recycling from the process.
