= Muhammad Isa al-Bakr =

Qatari activist

Muhammad Isa al-Bakr (Arabic: محمد عيسى الباكر, romanized: Muḥammad 'Īsā al-Bākr) is a Qatari activist who served as a coordinator of the defunct Madad Ahl al-Sham online fundraising campaign and currently works as an employee of Ooredoo. While al-Bakr was serving as a coordinator of Madad Ahl al-Sham, the group conducted shipments of humanitarian aid supplies to rural neighborhoods in Syria. Madad Ahl al-Sham has been accused of financing the Syrian branch of al-Qaeda, the al-Nusra Front. In 2013, al-Bakr was one of two Qatari citizens arrested for submitting a "threatening letter" to the French Embassy in Qatar. He died in September 2018 at 45 years old in car accidient.

== Background ==
=== Family ===
Muhammad Isa al-Bakr is one of five sons of Issa Haji Mohammed al-Bakr. One of Muhammad's brothers, Ibrahim 'Isa Hajji Muhammad al-Bakr, was labeled a Specially Designated Global Terrorist (SDGT) by the U.S. Department of the Treasury in 2014 for providing financial support to al-Qaeda and the Taliban and playing "a key role in a terrorist cell that was plotting to attack U.S. military bases and personnel in Qatar."

Issa Haji Mohammed al-Bakr died in November 2011 at 90 years old. Following his father's death, Muhammad Isa al-Bakr was in the al-Kheesa region of Doha, Qatar, but would later travel to Turkey.

== Madad Ahl al-Sham ==
Madad Ahl al-Sham was an online Qatar-based fundraising campaign purportedly created to provide humanitarian supplies to Syrian citizens in need. In an online flyer attributed to the campaign and distributed primarily through social media, the Madad Ahl al-Sham campaign requests donations from Qatari citizens to provide medicine, food, and clothes to Syrian civilians. In 2013, it was reported that as many as 31 tons of food and household medical items were transferred to Syrian citizens and refugees through the Turkish border in the sixth, seventh, and eighth installments of an assistance program funded by the donations collected by Madad Ahl al-Sham.

A member of Madad Ahl al-Sham, Mohammed Helwan al-Seqatri, told the Qatari newspaper al-Watan that over 50 young Qataris were volunteering for the campaign by collecting donations to be sent to Syria through the Turkish and Jordanian borders. According to the U.S. Department of State's Bureau of Counterterrorism, the Madad Ahl al-Sham online fundraising campaign was shut down by Qatari authorities in 2014.

Muhammad Isa al-Bakr was a promoter and coordinator of donations for Madad Ahl al-Sham. In early 2014, al-Bakr featured in a video promoting Madad Ahl al-Sham and describing its mission and activities. Al-Bakr also promoted the campaign, distributed its fliers, and showcased its aid collections and deliveries through his personal Twitter account. In 2014, a video surfaced online showing the delivery of food and toys to Syrian citizens in packages boxes. The boxes in the video are labeled as having been delivered under the supervision of Muhammad Isa al-Bakr.

== Q-Tel Group ==
It is believed that Muhammad Isa al-Bakr works for the Qatar-based telecommunications company Q-Tel Group.

== Connections to terrorism ==
=== Madad Ahl al-Sham ===
Muhammad Isa al-Bakr was involved in the operations of the online fundraising campaign Madad Ahl al-Sham. Since its emergence, Madad Ahl al-Sham was identified as a fundraising source for violent extremists including the al-Nusra Front, al-Qaeda's Syrian branch. In August 2012, the al-Nusra Front cited Madad Ahl al-Sham as "one of the preferred conduits for donations." Before being shut down in 2014, Madad Ahl al-Sham operated under the Qatar Centre for Voluntary Work, a government organization founded in 2001. In 2014, the U.S. Department of State described Madad Ahl al-Sham as an "online fundraising campaign that was suspected of sending funds to violent extremist elements in Syria."

== Arrest ==
On March 22, 2013, Muhammad Isa al-Bakr and Mansour bin Rashed al-Matroushi were arrested by plain-clothes officers while returning from a family trip to Mesaieed in the Southeast of Qatar. The two men were taken to the police headquarters in Doha and their families were notified that al-Bakr and al-Matroushi were being detained, but they did not receive a reason for their detainment. On March 23, 2013, both men were interrogated at the offices of the State Security Prosecutor reportedly without being informed of any charges or an arrest warrant. Qatari authorities, however, claimed that arrest warrants were issued.

On March 23 both men were placed in solitary confinement until March 27 when they were granted regular use of the prison phone line and were allowed a visit from family members and members of the Qatari National Human Rights Committee. While in detention, al-Bakr and al-Matroushi were re-questioned about the letter to the French embassy. Reports also emerged that the two men had begun a hunger strike on the morning of April 8. By April 11 al-Baker had allegedly become too ill to speak on the phone or walk. Al-Bakr and al-Matroushi were released on April 18, 2013, after having been detained for 28 days but were banned from leaving Qatar upon their release.

It is believed that the arrest of al-Bakr and al-Matroushi was prompted by their delivery of a letter dated March 3, 2013 to the French embassy in Qatar. Although the French embassy declined to comment on the letter, the embassy contacted Qatari authorities on March 7 who claimed the letter made clear threats to the embassy and France. According to a Doha News translation, the letter demands that the French government immediately ceases its military campaign in Mali "or else you (the French) will be exposing yourselves to the wrath of people who love death as much as you love life."
