= Al-Furqan Schools =

Qatar boys school

The al-Furqan Schools (Arabic: مدارس الفرقان) is a non-profit, boys-only educational complex offering classes in primary, preparatory, and secondary schools for grades 1-12 as well as an extracurricular activities club. The al-Furqan Schools are located in Doha, Qatar and were established in 1988. While the schools have been supported by the Qatari government, they have also been among the contributor to the Qatar-based Eid Charity, an organization which has been working in field of charity for years The leadership of the al-Furqan Schools has also been previously connected to a lot of charities

== Primary school ==
The al-Furqan primary school offers classes in grades 1-6. The offered classes include: Islamic studies, Arabic, general science, social sciences and mathematics.

Al-Furqan primary school students participate in a number of extracurricular activities and competitions. For example, in 2016 primary school students participated in computer training courses and an Arabic-language spelling bee.

The al-Furqan primary school employs 49 staff members and Mohammed Said is the Director of al-Furqan primary school.

== Preparatory school ==
The al-Furqan preparatory school offers classes in grades 7-9. The offered classes include: Sharia studies, English, science, Arabic, information technology, mathematics and social studies. The preparatory school also has a democratically elected student parliament.

Al-Furqan preparatory school students have participated in many extracurricular activities including sports, memorizing the Quran, calligraphy, school radio, and others.

Mahmoud Morsi is the Director of al-Furqan preparatory school and is a professor at the school.

== Secondary school ==
The al-Furqan secondary school offers classes in grades 10-12. The secondary school also has a democratically elected student parliament.

Adnan Taha is the Director of al-Furqan secondary school and is a professor at the school.

== Al-Furqan Creativity Club ==
The al-Furqan Creativity Club is a club for students of all grades to participate in extracurricular activities. In 2016, al-Furqan's Creativity Club completed an Umrah pilgrimage with 37 students from all three schools. The club has also embarked on leisure trips, also the club joined the Robotics competition held in Qata, participated in a camp, initiated soccer games, and engaged in many other extracurricular activities.

== Connections to government ==
In 2014, the Qatari government issued a decree of names of participating schools in Qatar that were eligible for an educational voucher system for the 2014/2015 academic year. The al-Furqan primary school was listed among the 71 schools announced by Dr. Mohammed bin Abdul Wahid al-Hamadi, the Qatari Minister of Higher Education and Secretary General of the Supreme Education Council. The voucher system is intended to promote a higher quality of education in Qatar, improve the academic achievement standards, and raise the level of competition between schools.

According to the voucher system, the Qatari government offers government-funded vouchers to Qatari parents who wish to send their children to private schools committed to teaching religious values, the Arabic languages, sciences, and history in accordance with the standards of the Supreme Education Council. The al-Furqan school was selected by the Qatari government as an institution that meets the standards and sources of the Supreme Education Council.

== Connections to Eid Charity ==
The al-Furqan Schools have connections to the Qatar-based Sheikh Eid bin Mohammad al-Thani Charitable Association, or Eid Charity.

In January 2009, the al-Furqan Schools submitted a check for QR 1 million (approximately US$274,593) to Eid Charity for the purpose of aid efforts in Gaza. During the same month, Eid Charity undertook three programs in cooperation with the al-Furqan preparatory and secondary schools entitled "Gaza, a Code of Honor."

In 2013, the al-Furqan Schools donated QR 1 million (approximately US$274,593) to support Eid Charity's assistance to Syrian refugees. Later that year, the Eid Charity Cultural Center established the Furqan Summer Center under the supervision of the Qatari Ministry of Islamic Affairs. The following December, al-Furqan again donated QR 250,000 (approximately $68,648) to Eid Charity's aid efforts for Syrian refugees.

In 2015, a delegation of al-Furqan School students visited refugee camps for Syrian refugees in Turkey. Eid Charity recognized the al-Furqan Schools for their close partnership and support.

== Evidence of humanitarian activities ==
=== Eid Charity ===
The al-Furqan Schools have provided substantial funding to Eid Charity, an organization with ties to terrorist organizations. A founding member of Eid Charity, Abd al-Rahman bin Umayr al-Nuaymi, is a U.S. Department of the Treasury Specially Designated Global Terrorist (SDGT) accused of overseeing the transfer of over $2 million per month to ISIS’ predecessor, al-Qaeda in Iraq.

Eid Charity has also been widely accused of transferring money to "Hamas charities" in the Gaza Strip, a mission that was boosted by the al-Furqan Schools financial assistance.

Described as "the biggest and most influential activist Salafi-controlled relief organization in the world" in a Carnegie Endowment report, Eid Charity also had close ties to the now defunct Madid Ahl al-Sham fundraising campaign. Shut down by Qatari authorities in 2014, Madid Ahl al-Sham was cited by the al-Nusra Front as "one of the preferred conduits for donations."

== Leadership ==
The Director General of the al-Furqan Schools, Khalifa bin Mohammed al-Rabban. Al-Rabban, a Qatari businessman, is the President and a member of the Board of Trustees of the Swiss-based human rights NGO Alkarama. One of Alkarama's founding members, Abd al-Rahman bin Umayr al-Nuaymi, listed by the U.S. Treasury as a financier and representative of al-Qaeda in the Arabian Peninsula, are Specially Designated Global Terrorists. Alkarama has also represented clients linked to Islamist militias operating in Syria.

Al-Rabban is also a member of the Global Anti-Aggression Campaign led by a close mentor of Osama bin Laden, Safar bin Abdul Rahman al-Hawali. The group, which also lists al-Nuaymi as a member, has supported and hosted members of Hamas’ leadership and their calls for jihad.
