= Global Anti-Aggression Campaign =

The Global Anti-Aggression Campaign (GAAC) (Arabic: الحملة العالمية لمقاومة العدوان) is a human rights non-governmental organization ostensibly established to resist foreign aggression against Islam, Muslims, and Muslim countries in a manner that complies with the Sunni-Islamic faith. The Global Anti-Aggression Campaign consists of a number of religious leaders, intellectuals, and human rights activists from the Arab World and holds annual conferences to advance their stated objectives and discuss Western and Israeli aggression on Muslim communities.

Since its establishment in 2005, several members of the Global Anti-Aggression Campaign have come under criticism for their connections to Al-Qaeda and other terrorist organizations or have been labeled as Specially Designated Global Terrorists (SDGT) by the U.S. Department of the Treasury. The Global Anti-Aggression Campaign (GAAC) is reportedly backed by Hamas and has been associated with other offshoots of the Egyptian Muslim Brotherhood.

== History ==
The Times of Israel reported that GAAC was established in 2003 in Saudi Arabia by Saudi members of al-Qaeda who hoped to promote the organization as peaceful. According to the report, GAAC was relocated to Qatar in 2005 due to opposition from the Saudi Arabian government. In 2005, Hamas leader Khaled Mashal as well as representatives from the Muslim Brotherhood and other Salafist organizations were reportedly members of the organization.

== Organization ==
=== Mission ===
The context of the establishment of the Global Anti-Aggression Campaign is specified in the organization's founding statement written by Abd al-Rahman al-Nuaimi. The founding statement accuses the US and Israeli governments of aggression by attempting to extend their influence over Muslim nations and peoples, plunder their resources, and alter their educational and social systems. According to the founding statement, the Western-led aggression also attempts to falsify and ridicule the values of Islam, attack the Quran and Muhammad and lead deceitful media campaigns and armed invasions.

In addressing the issues mentioned in the organization's founding statement, the Global Anti-Aggression Campaign seeks to “combine the efforts of the ummah, remind them of their duty to victory, make them aware of their right to self-defense, and oppose the aggressor in the most legitimate and influential way possible.” The Global Anti-Aggression Campaign claims to be established in compliance with Islamic order to defend the oppressed people and to drive away the oppressors.

The Global Anti-Aggression Campaign seeks to attract widespread attention to its activities and reports and does not represent a state or political party.

=== Goals ===
GAAC has the following goals:

1. Work on making the ummah aware of the actions of its enemies and its call to maintain its identity.
2. Oppose the aggressors through all possible means.
3. Awaken the Islamic spirit of Muslims in order to serve their religion and the ummah and defend their rights.
4. Clarify the true image of Islam and reveal the moral and humanitarian aspects of Shariah.
5. Work on the coordination and integration between popular and official efforts in Muslim countries in order to serve Islamic and humanitarian issues.
6. Work to effectively communicate with people, institutions, and international organizations in order to reject injustice and the domination of people and their capabilities.

== Support ==
=== Hamas ===
In 2005, Khaled Mashal, leader of Hamas since 2004, attended the first Global Anti-Aggression Campaign conference in Doha, Qatar between February 23 and February 25. During the conference, Mashal spoke on the importance of comprehensive resistance and referenced Hamas as a successful example of comprehensive resistance. In 2009, the Guardian claimed that the Global Anti-Aggression Campaign is supported by Hamas.

Following the 2009 Global Anti-Aggression Campaign conference in Istanbul, Turkey the BBC reported that religious scholars and clerics in attendance “met senior Hamas officials to plot a new jihad centered on Gaza.” Mohammed Nazzal, Hamas spokesman and senior leader based in Damascus, also attended the 2009 Global Anti-Aggression Campaign conference. The BBC claims “speaker after speaker called for jihad against Israel in support of Hamas.”

Nazzal also appeared at the 2016 Global Anti-Aggression Campaign conference in Istanbul entitled “the international day of support for al-Aqsa and Jerusalem.” During his speech, Nazzal praised the Palestinians who attacked Israelis during the increase in violence in Israel and Palestine during the 2014/2015 Silent Intifada. Nazzal also called for further attacks by assuring attackers would be religiously rewarded for their jihad.

=== Muslim Brotherhood in Syria ===
Former secretary general and comptroller general of the Muslim Brotherhood in Syria, Ali Sadreddine al-Bayanouni, attended the first Global Anti-Aggression Campaign conference in Doha, Qatar in February 2005. Al-Bayanouni called for the dissemination of a culture of resistance and to nurture people, families, and communities built on resistance.

== Ideology ==
=== Anti-semitism and anti-Christian sentiment ===
In 2014, an article entitled “The Root of Western Thinking, its Supporters, and its Cause of Strife on the Muslim People” was posted on the Global Anti-Aggression Campaign's website. The 2014 article references specific Biblical texts in order to demonize the Jewish and Christian faiths as recommending the use of cruelty in dealing with others and the allowance of killing all of those that do not adhere to their faith regardless of age or sex. According to the article, Jewish and Christian religious texts show “hatred for all the men, women, children, elderly, and even for useful animals like cows, donkeys and others.” The article states that the Global Anti-Aggression Campaign believes that the West is pursuing their policies based upon these religious texts.

=== Anti-Americanism ===
The Global Anti-Aggression Campaign expresses the organization's anti-American sentiments in the founding statement by claiming the American administration:

“is working to achieve control over Muslim nations and peoples, stealing their wealth, annihilating their will, and changing their educational curriculums and social orders. This totalitarian aggression has been portrayed through lies about Islam’s teachings, attacks on the Quran and the prophet Muhammad, may peace be upon him, as well as through misleading media campaigns and economic extortion.”

=== Anti-Zionism ===
The Global Anti-Aggression Campaign is staunchly anti-Zionist in ideology. The Global Anti-Aggression Campaign's founding statement lists the “Zionist power”, in addition to the American administration, as an aggressor against Islam.

== Alleged link to terrorist groups ==
=== Associations of members to terrorism ===
Safar bin Abdul Rahman al-Hawali is the president of the Global Anti-Aggression Campaign. Al-Hawali gained prominence as a leader in the Sahwa movement that strongly opposed the presence of U.S. troops in Saudi Arabia during the Gulf War. In 2001, the New York Times claimed that al-Hawali was one of the two people who influence Osama bin Laden the most.

The secretary general of the Global Anti-Aggression Campaign, Abd Al-Rahman al-Nuaimi, has been labeled “one of the world’s most prolific terrorist financiers.” The U.S. Department of the Treasury named Qatar-based al-Nuaimi a Specially Designated Global Terrorist (SDGT) in December 2013 for his role in channeling funds to international terrorist organizations.

According to the U.S. Department of the Treasury, Al-Nuaimi transferred over $2 million monthly to al-Qaeda in Iraq, ISIL’s precursor, for “a period of time.” More recently, al-Nuaimi has been accused of ordering the transfer of nearly $600,000 to al-Qaeda through the group's representative in Syria, Abu-Khalid al-Suri. The U.S. Department of Treasury also claims that al-Nuaimi has provided financial support to Osbat al-Ansar, al-Qaeda in the Arabian Peninsula, and individuals associated with East African-based terrorist group al-Shabaab. As of September 2014, it was reported that al-Nuaimi was living freely in Doha, Qatar.

The Global Anti-Aggression Campaign's assistant Secretary General Abbas Aroua is an Algerian medical physicist and adjunct professor of Medical Physics. Aroua is a founding member of the Swiss-based human rights NGO Alkarama alongside Abd Al-Rahman al-Nuaimi. Alkarama's clients have been linked to Islamist militias operating in Syria.

Rabih Haddad is a current board member of the Global Anti-Aggression Campaign and the co-founder of the Global Relief Foundation (GRF). Haddad served as the president of GRF, a defunct non-profit charitable organization, throughout the 1990s. The U.S. Department of Treasury claimed that GRF “has connections to, has provided support for, and has provided assistance to Usama Bin Ladin, the al Qaida Network, and other known terrorist groups” including the Taliban.( ) The U.S. Department of Treasury also asserted that Haddad had been a member of al-Qaeda's precursor organization Makhtab al-Khidamat (MAK) that was founded by Usama Bin Laden and Sheikh Abdullah Azzam.

Hassan Kettani, a GAAC board member, is a Moroccan imam and a former political prisoner in Morocco. Kettani was an “ideological leader” of Moroccan Islamist group Salafia Jihadia that Moroccan authorities claim helped coordinate the 2003 Casablanca bombings that resulted in the deaths of 45 people. In 2003, Kettani was given a 20-year sentence for his involvement in the bombings but was pardoned in 2012 after serving 9 years.

=== GAAC activities in support of terrorism ===
The Global Anti-Aggression Campaign has been in support of terrorist activities conducted in Israel and the Israeli-occupied territories since its establishment in 2005. In 2006, the Global Anti-Aggression Campaign posted a message on its website entitled “A Call to Support for the Palestinian Brothers.” In the message, the author encourages jihad and provides different Islamic texts to support the call for jihad.

In 2014, an article entitled “Between Running Over and Stabbings, a Tale of Revenge and Retaliation” was posted on the Global Anti-Aggression Campaign's website in support of the wave of terrorist attacks committed with knives and vehicles in Israel and the Israeli-occupied territories.
