= Sa'd bin Sa'd Muhammad Shariyan Al Ka'bi =

Sa’d bin Sa’d Muhammad Shariyan Al Ka’bi (also: Sa'd Sa'd Muhammad Shiryan al-Ka'bi and Sa'd al-Sharyan al-Ka'bi) is a known Qatari financier and facilitator of financial services that support the Qatari branch of Al-Qaeda, as well as Al-Nusra Front (ANF) for the People of the Levant (ANF), an al-Qaeda Syria based affiliate, which is listed by the United States as a terrorist group.

Al-Kabi is a U.S. Treasury Specially Designated Global Terrorist for his role in setting up donation campaigns in Qatar for the al-Nusra Front and acting as an intermediary to collect and facilitate the payment of a ransom for a hostage held by a militant group. According to the U.S. Department of the Treasury, Al Ka’abi was designated to the list because he has been involved in complex schemes to continue the flow of funds that aid violent terrorist activities networks in Syria, Pakistan, and Sudan since at least 2012.

In early 2014, al- Ka’abi arranged donation campaigns in Qatar, as requested of him by an ANF associate. He helped raise significant funds, by which the money raised was used for the purchase of arms and food for al-Nusra.

He was also involved in hostage exchange incidents with ANF. He was officially requested by the organization to act as an intermediary in collecting and facilitating a ransom payment in exchange for the release of a hostage held by ANF.

Al-Kabi also worked as a coordinator and fundraiser of Madad Ahl al-Sham, which posed as a charity organization by which supporters of Al-Nusra Front could provide funding.. Al-Kabi's name and phone number appeared on several Madad Ahl al-Sham fliers as a primary point of contact for those donating to the campaign. In 2014, CNN reported that al-Kabi's WhatsApp Messenger profile included a Madad Ahl al-Sham flyer calling for donations "equal to $1,500 to prepare a fighter by arming, feeding, and treating." In a 2013 Twitter post, al-Kabi claims that Madad Ahl al-sham raised the equivalent of $1.4 million from its Qatari donors.

He has also been linked to and worked closely with controversial individuals including Hamid Hamad Hamid al-'Ali, a Kuwaiti ANF fundraiser, in 2013 when he received funding from him to support ANF and Abd al-Latif al-Kawari, who he worked with on the Mahid Ahl Sham campaign.

As of August 2015, he has been designated as a Specially Designated Global Terrorist and been placed on the United States Treasury sanctions list for designated financiers of terrorism for his illicit financial activities in an effort to target the funding networks of terrorist organizations. He has since been placed on numerous sanctions lists for the same reasons including those of the United Nations Security Council, the European Union, Australia, Pakistan, the United Kingdom, Hong Kong, and others.

These sanctions allow to US Department of Treasury to confiscate any of his assets under American jurisdiction, as well as forbid any commercial interaction between him and any United States citizens. Under the UN's Security Council's Al-Qaida Sanctions he is under similar restrictions with having his assets frozen and a travel ban and arms embargo placed on him.
