= 2012 Villaggio Mall fire =

2012 fire at Villaggio Mall in Doha, Qatar

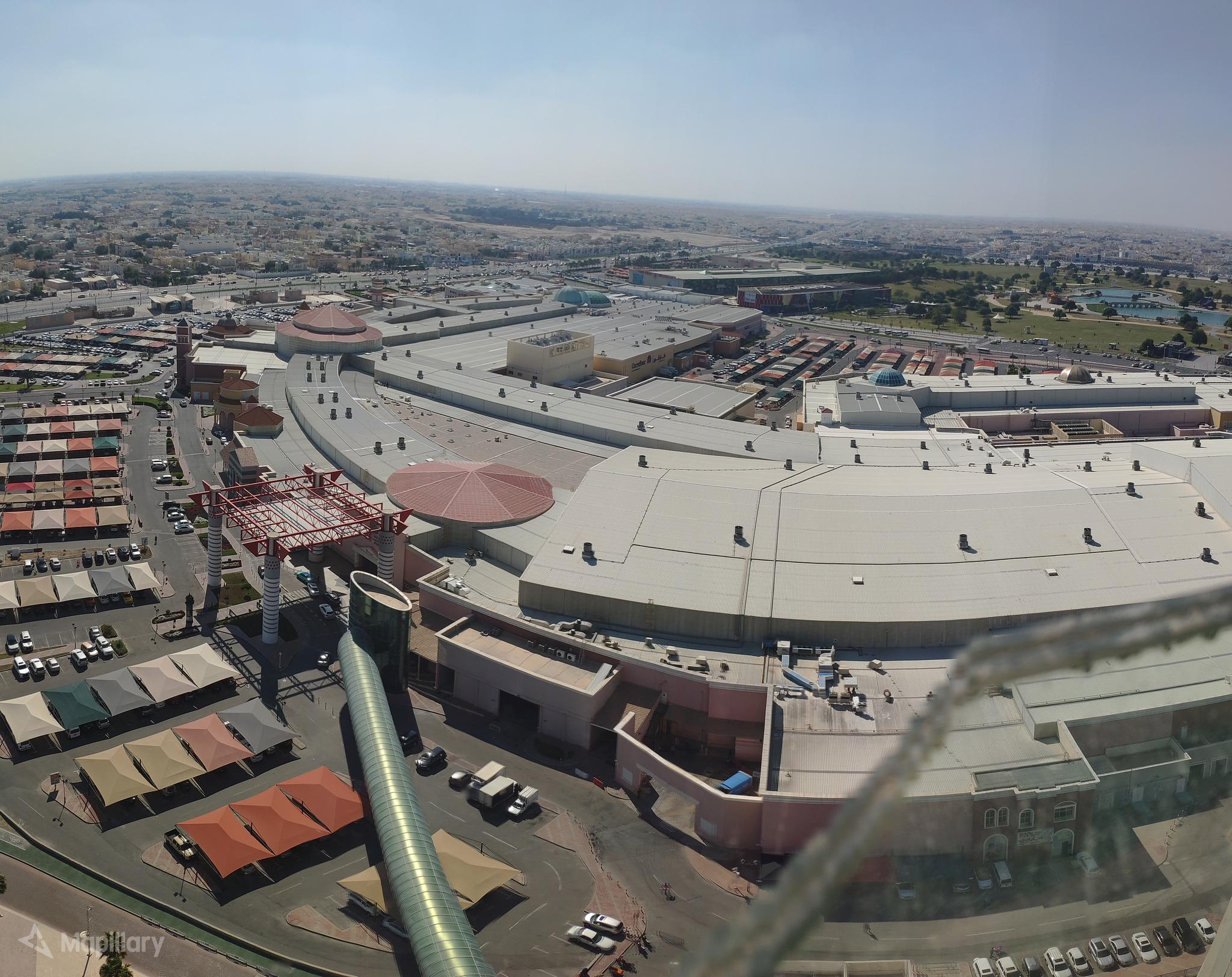
- Villaggio Mall in January 2020, after the fire.
- The site of the fire.
- Date: 28 May 2012; 14 years ago
- Time: 11:30 (08:00 GMT)
- Location: Villaggio Mall, Doha, Qatar; 25.2602535°N 51.4436073°E
- Cause: Electrical fault
- Deaths: 19
- Injuries: 17
- Sentence: 6 years in prison.

On May 28, 2012, an electrical fire broke out in Villaggio Mall in Doha, Qatar, killing at least 19 people, including 13 children, and injuring 17. The incident was the first of its scale in Qatar.

Following the incident, a government investigation identified negligence among various parties, attributing the fire to a failure to adhere to safety regulations. Despite acknowledging deficiencies, including a lack of emergency plans and staff training, the investigation concluded that the fire was not premeditated. In June 2013, five individuals were convicted, with varying sentences imposed, and subsequent legal proceedings saw mixed outcomes, including the overturning of four involuntary convictions in October 2015. In April 2016, a ruling saw none of the five defendants facing imprisonment, but instead, they were ordered to pay "blood money" compensation to the victims' families.

The mall reopened in September 2012, prompting criticism from the families of the victims, who felt excluded from the decision-making process and expressed disappointment over the lack of memorialization at the site.

== Incident ==
Abdullah bin Nasser Al Thani, the state minister for the interior, stated that the operations center received the initial report of a fire at Villaggio at 11:02 am. He noted that police and civil defense teams arrived at the scene within minutes, as reported by the QANA state news agency. He explained that it became evident that there were 20 children present at the nursery, and efforts were focused on evacuating them.

Brigadier Hamad al-Duhaimi of the Qatari civil defense stated that firefighters had to break through the roof for access after a staircase collapsed and that attempts to reach the children's area were hindered by the intense heat. The nursery lacked an emergency fire exit, and a subsequent government investigation revealed that staff did not respond adequately when the fire erupted.

A subsequent investigation revealed that the fire started on the upper floor of a Nike sports goods store due to an electrical issue with a faulty spotlight. The presence of flammable paint further fueled the rapid spread of the fire.

Witnesses recounted a chaotic and prolonged rescue operation at the day care center, where both children and adults were trapped for hours. Christine Wigton, an American residing in Doha, described hearing a faint buzzer upon entering the mall but observed no loud alarms despite increasing smoke levels. She noted that children were calmly dining in nearby restaurants, oblivious to the danger, and no evacuation efforts were underway. As the smoke intensified, shoppers continued browsing, unaware of the escalating situation. Wigton said she eventually left due to the overwhelming smoke and highlighted the absence of sprinklers or any indication of imminent danger. Describing the scene, expatriate New Zealand journalist Tarek Bazley likened the smoke to that of numerous steam trains. He criticized the lack of urgency among mall officials when alarms sounded. Describing the sound of the fire alarm as "more like a door bell," Bazley expressed concern and received reassurance from an attendant that it was likely a false alarm. He noted that it was a member of the public who urgently alerted everyone to evacuate as the fire had spread to another part of the mall.

The fire killed 19 people, including 13 children, four teachers, and two firefighters. 17 people were injured, including four children. The children killed in the fire, including a set of triplets, ranged from 18 months to 7 years old and were nationals of New Zealand, China, Canada, France, South Africa, Spain, Egypt and the United States. The two firefighters killed in the fire were nationals of Iran and Morocco, while the four other adults included a South African and three Filipino teachers. The Filipino teachers were found to have been undocumented migrants, according to the Overseas Workers Welfare Administration.

== Aftermath ==
=== Reactions ===
Despite all the victims being expatriates, memorial ceremonies following the incident attracted many Qataris. The fire raised questions about building safety in the country.

Qatari newspaper Al-Watan questioned the Ministry of Social Affairs regarding whether the nursery met the requirements for obtaining a license, expressing concerns about the presence of young children in a facility that may not have been adequately equipped. Saleh al-Kawari, the editor-in-chief of Al-Raya, characterized the purported negligence of safety standards as tantamount to "premeditated murder," labeling the incident as "a genuine catastrophe."

Following the tragedy, Qatari authorities extended condolences to the families affected and initiated an investigation. Qatar's then-crown prince, Sheikh Tamim bin Hamad Al Thani, personally visited some of the families affected and promised them justice.

President Khalifa Bin Zayed Al Nahyan extended condolences to Shaikh Hamad Bin Khalifa Al Thani, via a cable expressing sympathy for the tragedy. Shaikh Mohammad Bin Rashid Al Maktoum, Vice-President and Prime Minister of the UAE and Ruler of Dubai, as well as Shaikh Mohammad Bin Zayed Al Nahyan, Abu Dhabi Crown Prince and Deputy Supreme Commander of the UAE Armed Forces, also sent similar condolence cables.

A few weeks after the fire, Nike released the following statement:

Nike is deeply saddened by the deaths three weeks ago at the Villagio Mall in Qatar and our sympathies go out to the families involved. Nike is aware that the investigative report into the fire has been completed by local authorities and the Nike store, owned and operated by our Middle East distributor, was part of the investigation. Nike is seeking further clarity around a number of elements raised in the report before providing further comment.”

=== Investigation and trial ===
The Qatar Special Higher Committee's investigation found negligence on the part of the security team responsible for the shopping complex, citing delayed response to the incident. The committee also noted the absence of emergency plans to address such a scale of emergency and highlighted a lack of training among the shopping center staff to handle fire-related scenarios. The fire was determined to have originated on the upper floor of a Nike sports goods due to an electrical issue that caused a faulty spotlight to ignite and was exacerbated by flammable paint, leading to its rapid spread. The investigation attributed the fire to a "failure to comply with laws, regulations, and safety measures by various parties to varying extents." According to a report, the day care center "lacked the required licensing as a nursery from the ministry of social affairs, thereby failing to meet necessary safety standards." Investigators determined that firefighters had taken two hours to reach the children trapped inside the nursery. The investigation committee stated that the fire was not premeditated and concluded that there was a general failure to adhere to necessary laws, systems, and measures by all involved parties to varying degrees. This lack of adherence encompassed aspects such as design, licensing, and safety conditions.

In November 2012, the trial was adjourned until 19 December following a request from defense lawyers to include Nike, whose shop was the origin of the mall fire, as defendants. Representatives from Civil Defense and insurance companies were also requested to be added to the list of defendants. Prosecutors objected to this request, but the judges stated that it would be considered.

In June 2013, five people were found guilty of death by negligence. Qatar’s ambassador to Belgium, Sheikh Ali Bin Jasim Bin Al Thani, and his wife Iman Al Kuwari, who owned the Gympanzee day care center where the children died, were sentenced to six years in prison, the maximum sentence, and ordered to pay 200,000 Qatari riyal in blood money to the victims’ families. The chairman and deputy managers of the Villaggio mall, Abdul Aziz Mohammed Al-Rabban and Tzoulios Tzouliou, received the same sentence and restitution order. Mansour Nasir Fazzaa al-Shahwani, a municipal worker, was convicted of forgery and sentenced to five years in prison for issuing a license to Gympanzee. The mall's head and deputy of security were cleared of the charge.

The families of the victims issued a joint statement expressing satisfaction with the verdict but demanding further clarity and urging Qatari officials to release the complete official report on the incident.

Appeal sessions began in November 2013.

Discussions persisted regarding Gympanzee's legal classification. Both the criminal trial and the appeal focused on whether Gympanzee was a play area for children, as indicated by its license, or a nursery. The lower court deemed it the latter, ruling that Gympanzee operated unlawfully. In the previous appeal hearing in February, the court reviewed photos of Gympanzee displaying educational materials such as alphabet posters and a blackboard. This led the judge to remark that Gympanzee seemed to offer educational and recreational activities, supporting the argument that it functioned as a nursery rather than merely a play area or temporary childcare service.

During court proceedings in March 2015, an official confirmed that a Nike store at the mall, where the fire originated, did not possess the required Civil Defense permits. This revelation, previously undisclosed, reignited inquiries into why Nike was not also among those being held accountable for the incident.

Defense lawyers attempted to portray the Villaggio fire as typical of other incidents in the country, emphasizing the extensive media coverage it received. Concerns arose regarding the functionality of the mall's fire suppression systems on the day of the incident, particularly as reports indicated some water pumps at the shopping center needed repair. Defense counsel argued that the faulty pumps serviced the mall's outdoor irrigation system, not firefighting equipment. The attorney representing the mall manager contested the lower court's conclusion regarding the length of the shopping center's fire hoses. Civil Defense witnesses testified during the appeal hearings that the mall operated with a valid license, despite previous concerns raised about the flammable nature of its paint and decorations before its opening in 2006 and during a subsequent review two years later.

In October 2015, the Court of Appeal overturned the convictions of involuntary manslaughter after ruling that several pieces of evidence and witness testimony were inadmissible, acquitting the four individuals who had been convicted and sentenced. The company that owns the mall, the Qatari Company for Real Estate and Commercial Projects, was found guilty of involuntary manslaughter, facilitating the progression of lawsuits filed both in the United States and Qatar. The judge ruled to dismiss all testimony provided by family members of the victims during the initial criminal trial, asserting that one cannot serve as both a witness and a plaintiff in the same case. Several relatives of the deceased expressed dismay at the judge's apparent attribution of blame to the deceased Gympanzee staff, particularly regarding the partially blocked emergency exit. “It made it difficult, not impossible. In the case of a fire, people don’t move slowly. If there is a hurdle in front of you, you (pick up) a child and jump and get out,” the presiding judge Abdalrahman al-Sharafi said. All five defendants were absent during the ruling. Qatar’s attorney general Ali bin Fetais Al Marri sought a review of the decision.

In February 2016, Qatar’s highest court, the Court of Cassation, ordered a retrial at the Court of Appeal, ruling that the judge applied the law incorrectly.

In April 2016, a judge decided that none of the five defendants on trial would face imprisonment but opted to "punish them once more" by requiring them to pay "blood money" compensation to the victims' families. The judge refrained from using legal terms like "guilty," "conviction," "not guilty," or "acquittal" during the verdict reading. The blood money had been initially ordered by a lower criminal court judge in 2013, with some families having already received their payments. One of the defendant's attorneys raised concerns about transparency, citing instances where relatives of the deceased had accepted financial settlements in March and consequently dropped both criminal and civil cases. Najeeb al-Nauimi stated that the order to pay blood money indicated that the court found the defendants guilty of a crime. He said the prosecutor had the right to appeal the ruling to the Court of Cassation. The municipal worker found guilty of forgery had his sentenced reduced to a one-year sentence suspended for three years.

=== Reopening ===
In September 2012, Villaggio Mall partially resumed operations, over three months after the fire. The families of the child victims expressed anger at the reopening and demanded accountability for the tragedy. In a letter to The National, the relatives criticized both the mall and the government for failing to inform them of the decision beforehand. They expressed anger that they were not invited to privately mourn their children at the site of the incident, condemning the mall owners and management for their lack of consideration.

In June 2013, the mall reopened the damaged corridor and it was reported that no memorial had been erected along the hallways. The families of the deceased accused the mall of "continual insensitive behaviour" in a statement.
