= Al-Rashad Union =

Al-Rashad Union الاتحاد الرشاد
- General Secretary: Abd al-Wahhab al-Ḥumayqani
- President: Muhammad Musa al-Amri
- Founded: 2012
- Ideology: Salafism; Islamic democracy; Yemeni unity
- Colours: Green
- House of Representatives: 0 / 301

The Al-Rashad Union (Arabic: الاتحاد الرشاد) is the first Salafi political party founded in Yemen. Established in March 2012, it was officially recognized by the National Unity Government on 24 July 2012 under the patronage of the Gulf Cooperation Council and in the framework of the agreement between President Ali Abdullah Saleh and the opposition.

The party aims to express a conservative Islamic voice in the country and seeks the establishment of the Shariah. Al-Rashad is also committed to democracy and to the protection of the Yemeni citizens’ rights.

Currently, Abd al-Wahhab al-Ḥumayqani is the party's secretary general, and Muhammad Musa al-Amri is its president.

== Origins of the party ==
The descent of a group of Yemeni Salafis in the political arena was officially announced in a three-day conference in March 2012. According to Abd al Wahhab al-Humayqani, then secretary general of the preparatory committee and later secretary-general of the party, al-Rashad would “contribute to the nation's awakening in line with developments being witnessed by Yemen and Arab region in light of the Arab Spring.”

In fact, the revolutionary uprising of March 2011 in Yemen and the brutal repression of the peaceful demonstrations by Saleh's government triggered significant changes in the country's political field, and motivated many Salafis to dismiss their traditional quietist and apolitical stance and to embrace a more participatory role.

Al-Rashad's members decision to enter the political arena was framed in terms of a religious duty in response to the oppressive reaction of Saleh to the popular uprisings. In a press interview, Mohammed Musa al-Amri, al-Rashad's current president, argued that Saleh no longer qualified as the “Imam of the Muslims” as he had failed to act upon his obligation to “promote virtue and prevent vice,” and had therefore lost the right to be unquestionably obeyed by the people. Al-Homaiqani further stated in an interview that Salafis are not against political action, and took a firm stance against secularism and the abstention from involvement in the country's politics, involvement which is allegedly regulated by the Shariah.

Nonetheless, the announcement of the party's foundation raised criticism from a number of Salafi voices in the country. Some moderate Salafis claimed that the movement should refrain from political engagement and remain personal and religious only. Other criticized al-Rashad for its initial availability to work out a compromise with the Houthis despite the traditional Salafi perception of Shi'ites as heretic. More radically, Salafis from the Sa’ada province entirely condemned al-Rashad members’ partisan political affiliation.

== Principles and goals ==
Laurent Bonnefoy and Judit Kuschnitizki reported that, during an interview in 2012, al-Humayqani identified specific political and operational reasons why al-Rashad was established. The leader mentioned the necessity to provide a peaceful alternative to violence and to establish a solid democracy, as well as to give space to the quest for a new political project by the Salafi youth. Moreover, al-Humayqani emphasized al-Rashad's willingness to compensate for the absence of a clear Islamic voice in Yemen where “political hypocrisy dominated”. Along the same line, a former Minister of Religious Affairs Judge Hamoud Al-Hitar interviewed during the March 2012 conference argued that Yemen had experienced economic, political and security problems because of rampant corruption in all state institutions and a lack of justice and state of rule. On that occasion, the Rashad Union members publicly declared their commitment to “bring about justice and shoura (consultation) in a united and stable Yemen” and to establish the Shari’ah law in the country. As a comprehensive system regulating every aspect of human existence and valid for all times and places, Islam must be proclaimed the religion of the state. In fact, the Rashad Union affirms that the Qur'an and the Sunna are the two sources of authority for the Yemeni society and state.

Moreover, al-Rashad's manifesto states the importance of State sovereignty and of the principle of the separation of powers, the political accountability of the rulers, and the independence of the process of decision making against external interferences. The document also reiterates al-Rashad's commitment to human rights, health and education, as well as to promote new employment opportunities for Yemeni youth. Al-Rashad claims to defend the traditional values of Yemeni societies, asserts the crucial importance of family and of the role of women in the development of the society and of the State.

== Al-Rashad Union on the Yemeni political scene ==
Al-Rashad's leaders placed themselves by the side of the people and the revolutionaries, and thereby sought to differentiate themselves from other political actors in Yemen. Asked about al-Rashad's potential alliances with other political parties, al-Humayqani confirmed the party's effort to remain equidistant from all Yemeni political forces but stressed that “an alliance can be formed with any party regardless of its past.” Furthermore, al-Amri argued that the party was willing to engage dialogue with Western officials if functional to serve Yemen's public interest.

Al-Rashad participated in the Yemen National Dialogue Conference, but the party soon entered into armed clashes with the Houthis, which had been invited to take part in the national dialogue as well. At the end of 2014 Houthi forces targeted al-Rashad's offices and its leaders’ residences.

== Allegations ==
In 2013 the U.S. denounced al-Rashad's association with al-Qaeda in the Arabian Peninsula (AQAP), a Yemen-based franchise of the global terrorist group. In December 2013 the U.S. Department of the Treasury designated the party's secretary general al-Humayqani as an al-Qaeda supporter based in Yemen, and identified him as a Specially Designated Global Terrorist (SDGT) for “providing financial support to and acting on behalf of al-Qa’ida in the Arabian Peninsula (AQAP).”

According to the U.S. Department of the Treasury press release the relation between al-Humayqani and AQAP traced back to the political unrest in Yemen in 2011, when al-Rashad's secretary general allegedly helped the terrorist organization to gain a foothold and safe haven in al-Bayda’ Governorate and acted as AQAP emir in the region. Al-Humayqani reportedly furthered AQAP's cause by using his Yemen-based charity and his status in the charitable community to funnel financial support to AQAP. Al-Humayqani, who “frequently traveled throughout the Arabian Peninsula while conducting business for AQAP,” also facilitated financial transfers “from AQAP supporters in Saudi Arabia to Yemen in support of AQAP operations.”

The U.S. authorities claimed that not only was al-Humayqani an advocate of AQAP cause in Yemen; he was also an important figure within the organization itself and had strong ties to the organization's leaders. His pivotal role within AQAP is proved by the fact that al-Humayqani allegedly represented AQAP in meetings with Yemeni officials to negotiate the release of Yemei soldiers, actively recruited and coordinated the movement of AQAP fighters in the country, and even directed a group of AQAP members planning to attack government facilities and to assassinate Yemen officials. According to the U.S. Department of the Treasury press release, al-Humayqani was – along with other AQAP members – to be held responsible for the AQAP attack to a Republican Guard base in al-Bayda Governatoraten (Yemen) which killed seven.

Moreover, the U.S. authorities argued that al-Rashad's general secretary and AQAP leadership intended “to establish a new political party in Yemen, which AQAP planned to use as a cover for the recruitment and training of fighters and a means to attract broader support,” and that “AQAP leadership decided that al-Humayqani would play a public role as a leader and spokesman for the new political party.”

Supported by President Mansour Hadi, who refused on 5 January 2014 to extradite the politician, al-Humayqani has regularly denied all charges. Nonetheless, as David Andrew Weinberg remarks, the U.S. allegations reflect poorly not only on Hadi's exiled administration and on al-Rashad, but on al-Humayqani's Qatari “patron” as well.

The Washington Post reported that al-Humayqani once served as an adviser on charitable giving to Qatar and was one of the local representatives of the Qatar-based al Karāma organization. Both The New York Times and the Yemeni Marib Press highlighted that an arm of the Qatari government financially supported the construction of a $1.2 million mosque in Yemen in 2010, and al-Humayqani and Qatari officials attended its opening. In particular, according to Marib Press, most of Qatari funding to the mosque was arrogated by Qatar's Ministry of Islamic Affairs and Endowments and supervised by the Qatar-based Eid bin Mohammed Al Thani Charitable Association. Alongside al-Humayqani, the Qatari ministry sent Abdulmajid al-Zindani to attend the opening ceremony. Al-Zindani was a one-time mentor of Osama bin Laden designated as “a loyalist to Usama bin Laden and supporter of al-Qaeda” by the U.S. department of the Treasury and listed as associated with al-Qaida by the United Nations.

== See also ==
- List of political parties in Yemen
