= Doha News =

Online news platform

- Website type: News site
- Creators: Shabina Khatri; Omar Chatriwala
- Website: dohanews.co
- Launched: March 2009 (as Twitter account); 2012 (as website)
- Current status: Active

Doha News is an online news site started in March 2009 by two American journalists, Shabina Khatri and Omar Chatriwala, as a Twitter account. It later became a Tumblr blog, then finally a website in 2012. It is based in Qatar and provides its readers with daily reports on breaking domestic and international news stories. It gained considerable popularity in May 2012 when it became the first news outlet in Qatar to report on the fatal May 2012 fire at Villaggio Mall.

By late 2016, Doha News had become the most popular local news platform in Qatar, and was widely considered to be the only independent and reliable source for news within Qatar, covering sensitive issues and expressing criticism of the government.

In November 2016, Qatari authorities blocked access to the website from within the country. The official claim was that the reason was lack of proper licensing, but this was widely rejected as an excuse for censorship.

In May 2020 Doha News was allowed to relaunch in Qatar, with a different team and under an unspecified new owner. The Global Investigative Journalism Network noted in 2021 that since 2017 Doha News has "toned down its critical reporting", but added that it does still "provide a welcome relief from the seven newspapers in the country that practice extreme censorship".

== History ==
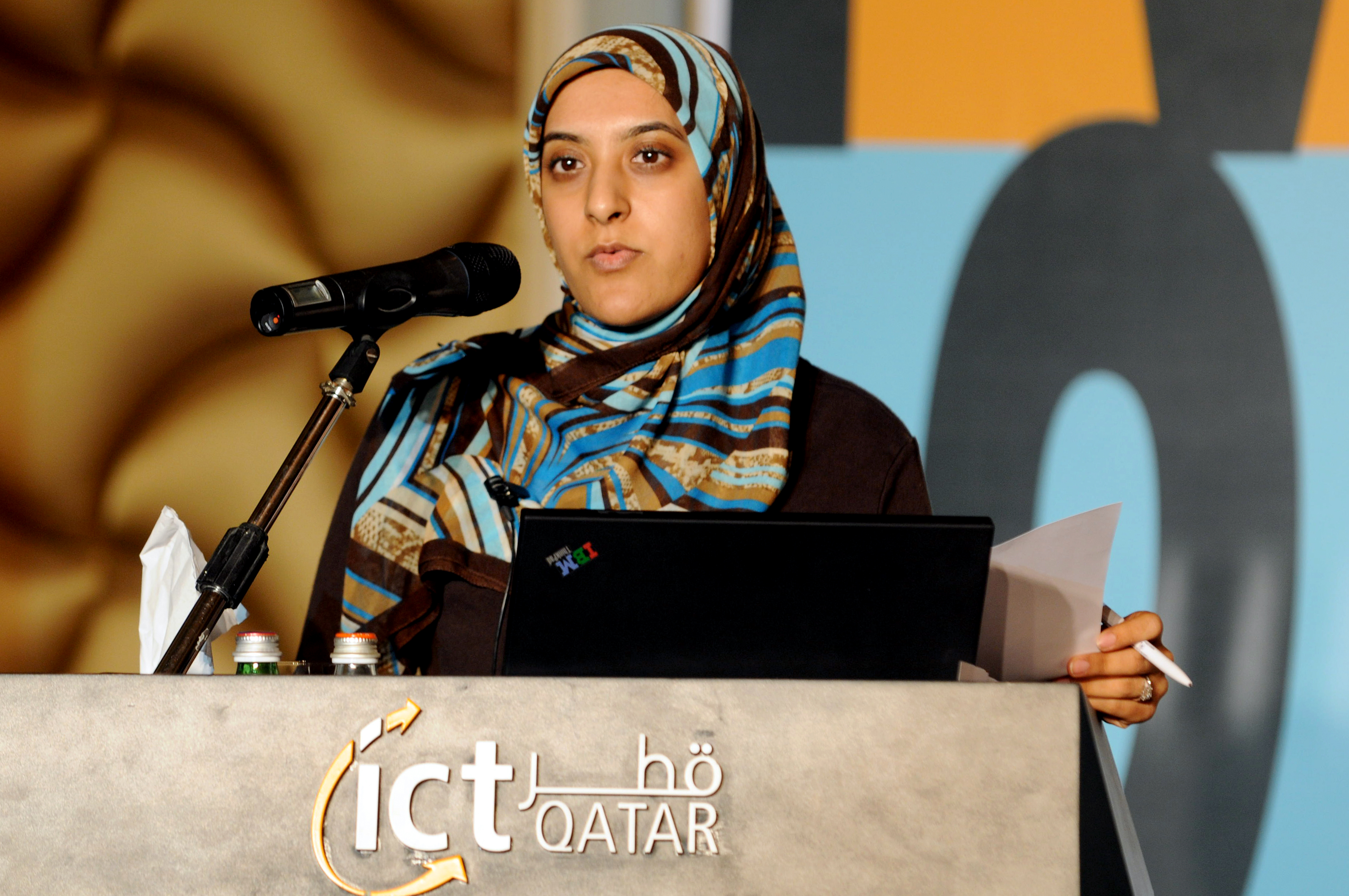
Shabina Khatri, founder of Doha News, giving a presentation on her experience with blogging.

=== Founding and website launch ===
In March 2009, Shabina Khatri created the Doha News account on Twitter. It later became a Tumblr blog, then, in 2012, Khatri and her husband, Omar Chatriwala, went on to launch a stand-alone website. It was the first digital news outlet established in the country. They have stated that their aim is to create a media platform in which they could engage the audience in a manner dissimilar to traditional forms of media.

=== The Villagio Mall fire and increased popularity ===
Doha News quickly increased in popularity due to its coverage of controversial local events not as widely reported in government-run media, with a notable instance being the May 2012 fire at Villagio Mall in which 19 people were killed. It succeeded in obtaining and releasing verifiable figures and facts, such as the identities of the victims of the fire, whereas many other forms of online media reported unverified rumors. It experienced a massive increase in visitors during the event, increasing from about 10,000 visitors a day to 100,000 visitors a day. On the contrary, traditional media was criticized for its late and minimal coverage of the incident. In February 2013, the site was prevented from reporting on the court proceedings of the Villagio Mall fire.

Another sensitive story published by the website centered on the rape and prosecution of Qatari resident Marte Dalelv in the United Arab Emirates. It was not mentioned in print media, but appeared in international publications such as The New York Times after Doha News published a news article on the case. Similarly, after the murder of Lauren Patterson in October 2013, it was the most notable Qatari media outlet to report on the killing and some of its work was quoted in international newspapers.

By late 2016, Doha News had become the most popular local news platform in Qatar, and was considered by the Columbia Journalism Review to be "the only reliable source of daily information for residents" in a country whose media was "dominated" by "state-owned entities" and privately owned newspapers.

=== 2016 block by Qatari authorities ===
In August 2016, Doha News drew both praise and condemnation by publishing a piece about the challenges of being gay in Qatar. In October of that year, the publication argued in an editorial that the Qatari "cybercrimes law" was being "exploited by criminals and individuals with personal agendas to silence others", and noted that one of its own reporters was briefly detained over an article.

In November of that year, the website was simultaneously blocked in Qatar by the country's two internet service providers, Ooredoo and Vodafone, supposedly without any former notice, leading Doha news to state that it can "only conclude that our website has been deliberately targeted and blocked by Qatar authorities" in what "appears to be an act of censorship". The official reason was that the website was operating without a license, but this was seen by many observers as an excuse for censorship. Amnesty International stated that "the government appears to have specifically targeted a key source of independent and credible journalism in the country", and called it "an outright attack on media freedom". Human Rights Watch called it "the country’s only independent news website", and said that the government block "undermines Qatar’s attempts to present itself as a center for media freedom in the Gulf region".

=== 2017 sale to Star Reputation Consulting Ltd. ===
In October 2017, supposedly because the local block severely hurt advertising sales, the founders of Doha News were forced to sell the site to Indian online media company Star Reputation Consulting Ltd., which stated that it would try to get the publication unblocked. Former editor-at-large Victoria Scott reported that the editorial team "decided to walk away after the company expressed a desire to enforce its own — undisclosed — editorial values on existing staff". Shortly after the takeover, the student newspaper of Northwestern University in Qatar reported on reader backlash to the few posts made by Doha News since then, among which was a picture and quote of senior Qatari official Hassan Al Thawadi stating that the 2022 FIFA World Cup would benefit India.

=== 2020 new owner and unblocking in Qatar ===
In 12 May 2020 Doha News reported that it was coming back with a different team and an unspecified "new owner", adding in 2020 that it "was allowed to relaunch in 2020 under new management and a new team". Other sources also reported on access to the website from within Qatar being restored in 2020. The Global Investigative Journalism Network noted in 2021 that since 2017 Doha News has "toned down its critical reporting", but added that it does still "provide a welcome relief from the seven newspapers in the country that practice extreme censorship".

== Content and editorial policies ==
=== Before the block ===
Up to its block in 2016, Doha News was described by many sources as the only independent and reliable source of news and information within Qatar, and as having a history of critically covering sensitive social and political issues that most local news providers omitted. It was also said to have covered expat issues and local culture.

=== Since the unblock ===
The Global Investigative Journalism Network noted in 2021 that since 2017 Doha News has "toned down its critical reporting", but added that it does still "provide a welcome relief from the seven newspapers in the country that practice extreme censorship".
