= Rabea TV =

Egyptian television channel

Rabea TV (Arabic: الفضائية رابعة قناة), also called the revolution channel, is a Muslim Brotherhood oppositional satellite TV network that broadcasts its stream from Turkey, but targets Egyptian viewers.

== Background ==
The name of the network, Rabea, means the fourth, which is why its logo features a hand holding up four fingers. The name derives from a mosque and square in Cairo, where some of the largest groups of Muslim Brotherhood supporters would meet and protest. At one point there was a sit in there that lasted forty days before being dispersed. This sign symbolizes solidarity for those protestors during the anti-coup movement for the overthrow of Mohamed Morsi. Many today see this as a terrorist sign, especially considering the fact that the Egyptian government declared the Muslim Brotherhood a terrorist organization in 2013. Allegedly, the first person to physically display this slogan was Turkish President Recep Tayyip Erdogan.

The network, established by the Muslim Brotherhood, launched in 2013 in Turkey. Rabea TV announced in 2013 that it would begin broadcasting with the support of the Turkish State. According to local Egyptian media, Turkey"s National Security Service (MIT) founded the network under the leadership of Hakan Fidan, MIT's undersecretary of the intelligence service. In early talks about Rabea TV, a spokesperson for the Muslim Brotherhood during Morsi's presidency indicated his fears that this channel's establishment could lead to a new crisis in Egyptian-Turkish relations. Turkish politician Faruk Logoglu expressed similar sentiments when he stated that Turkey's hosting of networks that terrorize the Egyptian people and threaten foreigners has placed Turkey in a questionable position in international platforms.

Al Rabea TV broadcasts from Istanbul, and its content is known to have an Islamist slant and pushes Muslim Brotherhood propaganda. It uses the slogan, "The Pulse of Freedom" as self-promotion. Despite Rabea TV being aired from Turkey, Turkish government has denied that any Muslim Brotherhood affiliate TV stations are being broadcast from Turkey.

== Controversial content ==
The network has aired its fair share of aggressive and violent content, and is known to incite public opinion on violence towards state, military, and civil institutions. On air, a cleric named Salama Abd al-Qawi issued a statement of encouragement for anyone who would assassinate Egyptian President Abdel Fatteh al-Sisi stating that whoever got the job done would be doing a good deed.

Also, on one of Rabea TV's programs, a threatening warning statement was broadcast from a group called the Revolutionary Group Leadership, telling Westerners and Western investments in Egypt to leave the country or they would be targeted soon. The station also aired content that police and soldiers in attendance of a western economic conference that was to take place in Cairo would be killed.

== Followers ==
The network has YouTube and Facebook pages. Its YouTube page, founded in 2015 and featuring both a live stream and past videos, is subscribed to by over 1,100 users and has had a total of 160,112 views. Its Facebook page has been active since 2013, where Rabea TV is listed as an alternative global media network. Rabea TV describes itself as an outlet to provide contemporary political issues through the Islamic perspective, highlighting issues of the Islamic world.

Additionally, it says that it seeks to achieve the demands of the Arab revolutions by building a relationship between the viewer and symbols of the Islamic intellectual. The page's background photo is a picture of former Muslim Brotherhood President, Mohammed Morsi, with the channel's logo as the profile picture. It frequently posts graphic photos and controversial Islamist statements, including numerous statements against Egypt's current president al-Sisi and praises of the demoted former president, Mohammed Morsi and of terrorist linked Muslim Brotherhood founder, Yusuf al-Qaradawi.

== Ownership ==
Rabea TV is owned by Qatari businessman Hashim bin Mohammed al-Awadhi. Al-Awadhi is the head of the media department for the controversial Qatari charity, Eid charity, also called the Sheikh Eid bin Mohammad al Thani Charitable Association. This charity has a reputation for backing the Muslim Brotherhood, globally designated terrorists and terrorist financiers, and al-Qaeda members.

Al-Awadhi's son was killed as part of ISIS's convoy of martyrs in 2015 near Kobani, Syria. Furthermore, al-Awadhi's X account is known to display graphic violent content that is in support of the Muslim Brotherhood and terrorist advances.

== Current standing ==
Rabea TV has weakened significantly in its standing, and has been on the verge of bankruptcy. This is due in part to the recent decline in Turkey's popularity in the Middle East based on polls conducted of 16 regional states as well as negative attention from foreign entities. Sources have reported that the Rabea TV's controversial standing has left it vulnerable to threats legal prosecution to stop broadcasting. A French satellite company has indicated its plans to discontinue the channel after it received notice of the network's association as a terrorist channel.
