= Abd al-Latif Bin Abdullah Salih Muhammad al-Kawari =

Al Qaeda financier

Abd al-Latif Bin Abdullah Salih Muhammad al-Kawari, born 1975, is a Qatar-based financier, fundraiser, and "security official" for the terror-group Al Qaeda.

== In Qatari army ==
While serving in the Qatari army reserves, al-Kawari was part of the failed 1996 counter-coup-d’état which aimed to overthrow the recently proclaimed Emir Sheikh Hamad bin Khalifa Al-Thani and restore his father to the throne(10). This failed attempt resulted in dozens of arrests and death sentences, including the jailing of the Emir’s own cousin, Sheikh Hamad Bin Jasim Bin Hamad Al-Thani.

== In Al Qaeda ==
In the early 2000s, al-Kawari worked alongside two major Al Qaeda operatives: Mustafa Hajji Muhammad Khan (a.k.a. Hassan Ghul) and Ibrahim ‘Isa Hajji Muhammad al-Bakr. Ghul was designated in 2011 as an Al Qaeda operative and courier, who was active "since at least 2003", and al-Bakr was designated in 2014 for providing financial, material, and technological support for the terror-group. Al-Kawari worked with Ghul and al-Bakr to transfer money to Al Qaeda in Pakistan, around the same time al-Kawari also obtained a fraudulent passport for Ghul.

In early 2012 al-Kawari facilitated the international travel of a courier carrying tens of thousands of dollars designated for Al Qaeda. Later that same year he, according to the U.S. Treasury Department, "worked...to coordinate the delivery of funding from Qatari financiers intended to support Al Qaeda and to deliver receipts confirming that al-Qaeda received foreign donor funding from Qatar-based extremists."

Al-Kawari was also involved in the online money-raising platform, Madad Ahl al-Sham. Al-Sham was a purported Qatar-based charity that worked to fund and support the Al-Nusra Front, Al-Qaeda’s Syrian branch. In August 2012 al-Sham was cited by a Nusra Front member as “one of [the group’s] preferred conduits for donations."

== World reactions ==
On August 5, 2015 al-Kawari was designated by the United States Government as a "financier responsible for supporting terrorists throughout the Middle East." The U.N. followed with sanctions and a designation on September 21 of the same year. Despite these designations the Qatari government has not arrested or restricted al-Kawari, and he is believed to continue to operate.

In September 2023, UAE published a report in which it announced the removal of Qatari figures and entities from the terrorist list including Abd al-Latif Bin Abdullah Salih Muhammad al-Kawari, who was previously added in the terrorist list by the blockading countries during the Gulf crisis in June 2017.
