= Villaggio Mall =

Villaggio
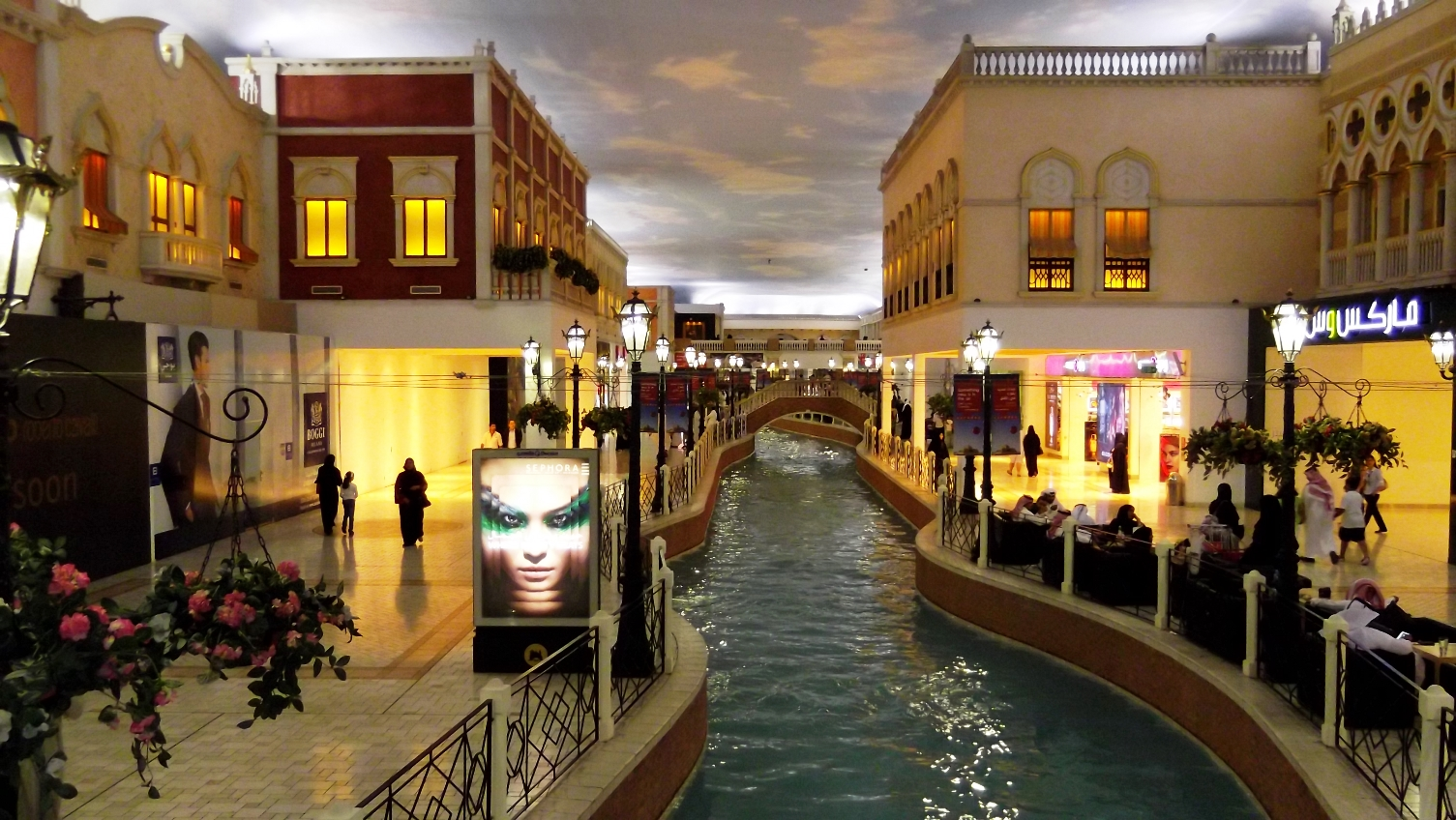
- Villaggio Mall interior in 2013
- Location: Doha, Qatar
- Coordinates: 25°15′38″N 51°26′35″E
- Opened: 7 June 2006, reopened on 20 September 2012 after fire
- Developer: Gondolania Entertainment
- Manager: Tzoulios Tzouliou
- Owner: Abdul Aziz Mohammed Al-Rabban
- Num. of stores: 220
- Floor area: 90,000 square meters (970,000 sq ft)
- Floors: 1
- Website: villaggioqatar.com

Villaggio Mall is a shopping mall located in the Aspire Zone in the west end of Doha, the capital city of Qatar. It is located on Al Waab street between the Hyatt Plaza and Sports City and has over 200 stores, including many famous brands in the U.S., U.K., Italian and German markets.

The mall has direct access to the Aspire Tower hotel, and has a Doha Metro station nearby. It was built along with the Aspire Zone for the 2006 Asian Games.

Inside, the interiors are Italianate-themed both as an Italian hill town, but also with a 150-meter long indoor canal with gondolas.

The Mall was partially re-opened on September 20, 2012, after meeting strict safety standards following the May fire that resulted in 19 deaths. The mall has since fully reopened, even with expansions and extra capacity.

== Gondolania Theme Park ==
The mall contains the Gondolania Theme Park, an indoor theme park which includes the Gondolania Ice Rink, one of two ice hockey rinks in Qatar, which is the home of the Qatar Ice Hockey League and the regional Desert Cup tournament. It is the only Olympic-size rink in Qatar. Also included are a ten pin bowling center and a roller coaster.

== 2012 fire ==
On 28 May 2012 at around 11 A.M. a major fire broke out in the Villaggio Mall, triggering an alarm described by an eyewitness as being "a very benign fire alarm, almost like a door bell". At first many were not worried as there had been a recent false alarm.

As the fire engulfed the Gympanzee nursery, the entrances to the nursery became blocked by smoke, trapping 13 children and four staff inside. Firefighters from the Qatari Civil Defense force were forced to break a hole in the roof of the mall to attempt a rescue. Along with the 17 trapped in the nursery, two firefighters were killed. The victims included children from Spain, New Zealand, France, Japan, South Africa and The Philippines; along with three Filipino teachers and one teacher from South Africa.

There were also 17 injured persons as a result of smoke inhalation, most of them members of the Qatari Civil Defense force. A total of 19 people lost their lives - 13 being children; three of them triplets from New Zealand. The investigation committee revealed that an electrical fault at the Nike store as the cause of the deadly fire. It also found that all parties concerned had lacked adherence in varying degrees to related laws, systems and safety measures.

The father of the killed triplets later said proper post-mortems weren't carried out on his children, despite the presence of "highly flammable paint and illegal flammable mouldings" at the mall. He blamed a closed emergency exit at the mall's daycare centre for the children's deaths.

It is still unclear whether or not Gympanzee was operating without a license from the Supreme Educational Council, as they had recently relinquished licensing duties to the Ministry of Social Affairs. An official at the ministry claimed that no license had ever been issued by their offices.

=== Response and trials ===
Shortly following the fire, Qatar's Attorney General, Dr. Ali al-Marri, issued the arrest of five people in connection with the incident, as well as the detention of both the manager and assistant manager of Villaggio, Tzoulios Tzoulio and Rami Itani, respectively. The assistant director of mall security, Mohammed Abdul Rahman, was also detained in connection with the case.

In June 2013, a lower court found five defendants guilty of involuntary manslaughter, and sentenced each to six years in jail (the maximum allowable sentence). Rami Itani and Mohammed Rahman were both acquitted. Husband and wife co-owners of Gympanzee, Sheikh Ali bin Jassim al-Thani and Iman Al-Kuwari were among those convicted, along with Tzoulios Tzoulio and Abdulaziz bin Mohammed al-Rabban. The last guilty verdict fell to Mansour Nasir Fazza al-Shahwani, the Ministry of Business and Trade employee that issued Gympanzee its permits, Mr. al-Shahwani was sentenced to five years in jail.

Co-owner of Gympanzee, Sheikh Ali bin Jassim al-Thani, is Qatar's ambassador to Belgium and is part of the powerful al-Thani family, his wife, Iman al-Kuwari, is the daughter of the then-Minister of Culture, Art, and Heritage, Hamad Bin Abdulaziz Al-Kawari.

Abdulaziz bin Mohammed al-Rabban is a private-businessman who owns the Qatari Company for Real Estate and Commercial Projects (Villaggio). During his closing arguments, which are reported to have lasted approximately five hours, Mr. Rabban's defense attorney claimed that his client didn't own any shares in the mall and was not a partner in the company that owned the mall. Despite these claims, Mr. Rabban remained listed on the mall's website under “key people” as Villagio's chairman. Mr. Rabban's defense attorney's tactics were heavily criticized by one of the parents of the victims that attended the hearing:

“It is quite frustrating how the defense lawyer continues to make a mockery out of court, joking around inappropriately and wasting time. Additionally, what’s absurd is for him to the pin the blame on the Nike store employee,” Raghda Kabbani – who lost her three-year-old daughter Hana in the fire.”

=== Appeal process and acquittal ===
During the appeal process, all those convicted remained free and able to travel; this was most clearly evident in the case of Sheikh al-Thani who remained in Brussels as a diplomat despite being convicted of manslaughter nearly two years prior. Furthermore, all defendants were absent from the final appeal hearing. During the hearing, Judge Abdalrahman al-Sharafi declared that he would be excluding all testimonies given by the victim's family as evidence, claiming that one cannot be a witness and a plaintiff in the same case.

Judge al-Sharafi further agreed with the owners of Gympanzee in their claim that it was not technically nursery, but an “entertainment centre”. This decision fell inline with the civil employee that decided to license it as such. After establishing that Gympanzee was an entertainment centre rather than a nursery, the co-owners were far less criminally-accountable under Qatari law.

On the 26th of October, 2015 Qatar's Appeals court overturned all five convictions and dropped all charges. The decision was met with shock and disappointment by the families of the blaze victims. During the judge's five-hour reading of the verdict some victim's family members reportedly stormed out of the court in anger.

While Mr. Rabban was also cleared of his involuntary manslaughter charge, the court found that his company was guilty of the same crime and, as such; Villaggio and its insurance company would have to pay a fine of only $5,500, and compensation to the victim's families.

== See also ==
- The Venetian Las Vegas
- The Venetian Macao
