= Mahmoud Ahmad Marei =

Syrian politician

- محمود أحمد مرعي

President of the Arab Organization for Human Rights
- In office ?–2021
- Preceded by: Position established
- Succeeded by: Alaa Shalabi

Personal details
- Born: 1957 (age 68–69) Talfita, Rif Dimashq Governorate, Syria
- Party: Democratic Arab Socialist Union (until 2013)
- Education: Damascus University

Mahmoud Ahmad Marei (Arabic: محمود أحمد مرعي; born 1957) is a Syrian politician, lawyer, former head of the Arab Organization for Human Rights, and former secretary-general of the National Democratic Front, a small, opposition party.

== Biography ==
Marei was born in Talfita, Rif Dimashq. He studied law at the Damascus University and graduated in 1993.

He is former president of the Youth Office at the National Coordination Committee for Democratic Change. He was a member of the internal opposition delegation to the Geneva peace talks on Syria (2017).

Marei was a candidate in the 2021 Syrian presidential election. According to the Daily Telegraph, "Few consider former state minister Abdallah Salloum Abdallah and Mahmoud Merhi, a member of the so-called 'tolerated opposition', serious contenders." The Democratic Arab Socialist Union rejected the legitimacy of the elections and distanced itself from Mahmoud Ahmad Marei, saying he had been expelled from the party in 2013.
