= Mourad Dhina =

Algerian physicist and activist

Mourad Dhina مراد دهينة

Personal details
- Born: 6 August 1961 (age 65) Blida, Algeria
- Party: Rachad
- Other political affiliations: Islamic Salvation Front
- Education: Massachusetts Institute of Technology

Mourad Dhina (Arabic: مراد دهينة; born 6 August 1961) is an Algerian physicist and activist living in Switzerland. He is the executive director of the Alkarama non-governmental organization.

== Education and scientific works ==
He obtained a master's degree in physics from MIT in 1985, two years later he obtained a Ph.D. in particle physics from the same institute. He worked as researcher at the European Organization for Nuclear Research and also the Swiss Federal Institute of Technology Zurich.

== Human rights and political commitment ==
He became an opponent of the Algerian government following the coup d'état of January 1992 that banned the Islamic Salvation Front (FIS), starting the Algerian Civil War. After being spokesman for the Coordination Committee of the FIS, he became head of the Executive Office of the FIS from October 2002 to October 2004, when he resigned and left the party, regarding it as inactive and ineffective.

During the 1990s, he supported terrorist groups such as the Islamic Front of Armed Jihad (FIDA) He did not hesitate to describe Mohammed Saïd as a martyr, in the review Al Qadiât in December 1995

Dhina condemns the violence of the Algerian army during the civil war of the 1990s but some Algerian activists close the "eradicators" claim that he has never condemned the violence and the murders of secular journalists and intellectuals by the Islamist extremists. His response is that he does condemn all victims of the violence and rejects the selectivity of those who want to single out the so-called "secular journalists and intellectuals". He has always called for independent and credible investigations into the massacres, disappearances, killings and torture that Algeria has witnessed since the 1992 coup. He advocates a national reconciliation based on memory, truth and justice.

In 2007, he founded with Mohamed Larbi Zitout, Abbas Aroua, Rachid Mesli and Mohamed Samraoui, the Rachad movement, an Algerian opposition movement which advocates a radical non-violent change in the Algerian political system to establish good governance in Algeria.

Dhina is the executive director of the Alkarama (dignity) non-governmental organization.

== Arrest and release ==
Dhina was arrested on 16 January 2012 by the French police at the Orly Airport while he was travelling to Geneva.

After almost six months of detention in Paris, the French judiciary finally ordered him released in a ruling that considered the Algerian warrant as ill-founded and that there was no reason to keep Dhina detained.
