= 2021 Syrian presidential election =

- 26 May 2021
- Turnout: 78.64%
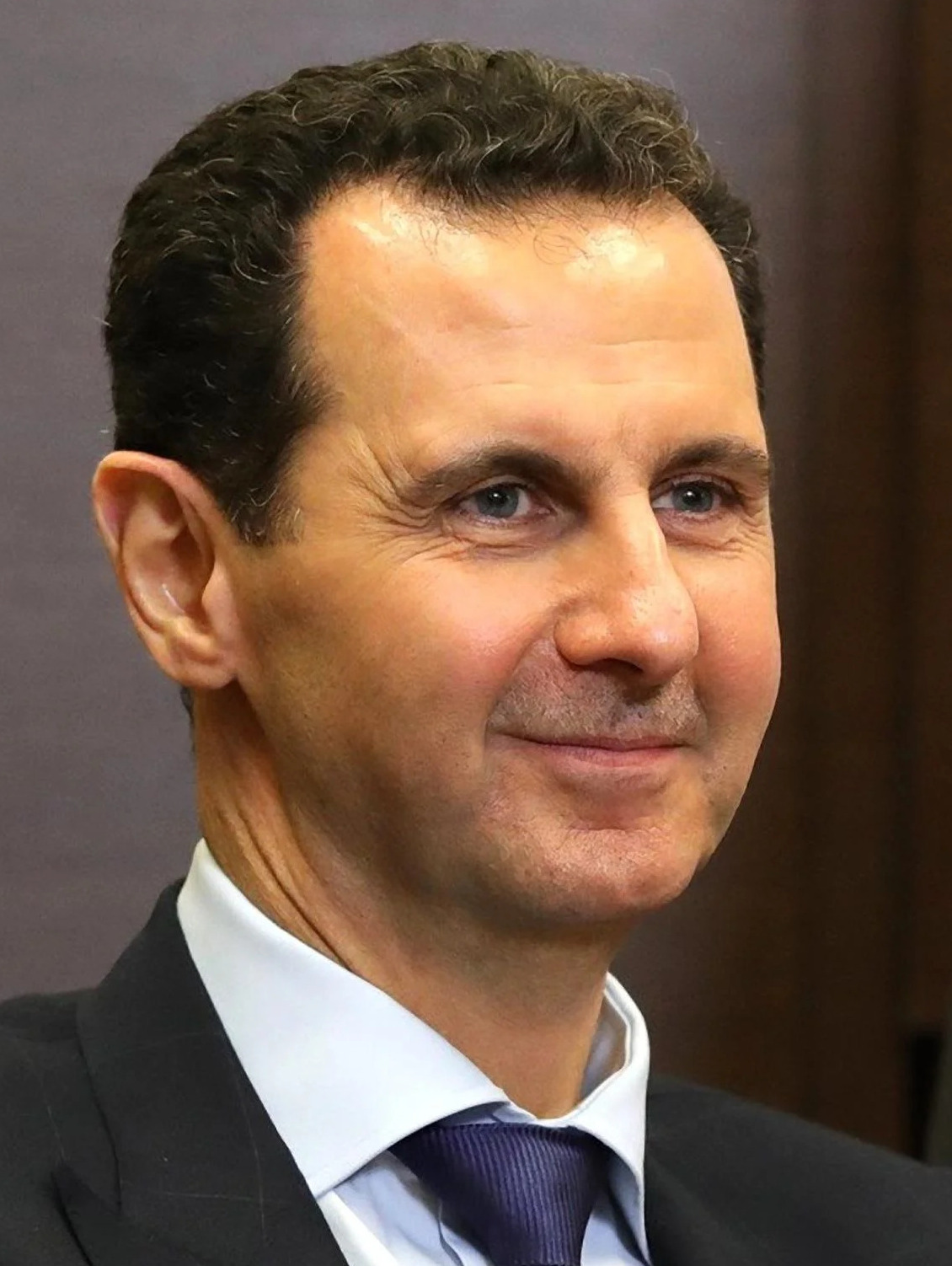

Nominee	Bashar al-Assad	Mahmoud Ahmad Marei
Party	Ba'ath Party	DASU (Note: The Democratic Arab Socialist Union rejected the legitimacy of the elections and distanced itself from Mahmoud Ahmad Marei, saying he had been expelled from the party in 2013.)
Alliance	NPF	NCC
Popular vote	13,540,860	470,276
Percentage	95.19%	3.31%
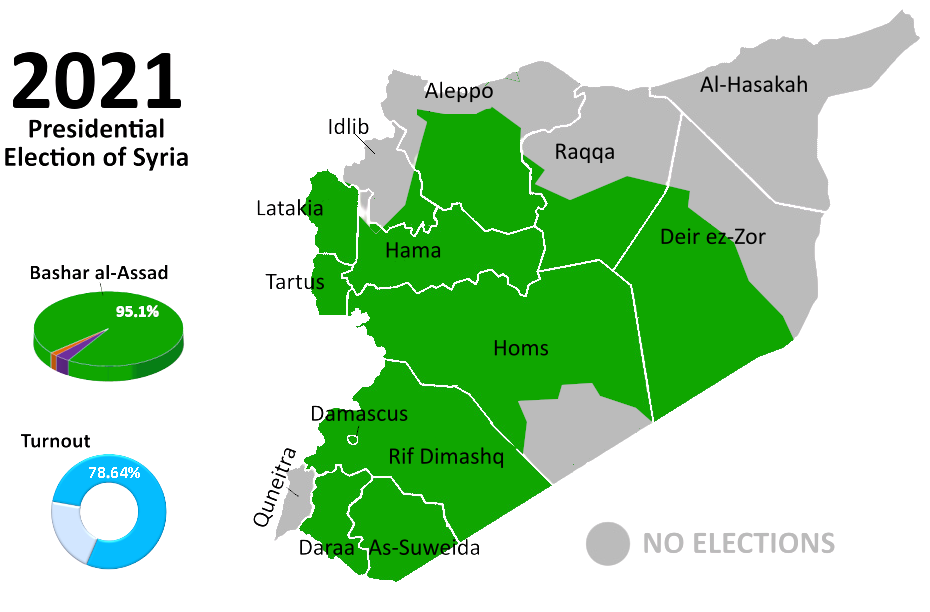
President before election
Bashar al-Assad
Ba'ath Party
Elected President
Bashar al-Assad
Ba'ath Party

Presidential elections were held in Syria on 26 May 2021, with expatriates able to vote in some embassies abroad on 20 May. This was the last presidential election to be held in Ba'athist Syria, prior to its overthrow following the 2024 Syrian opposition offensive.

The three candidates were incumbent president Bashar al-Assad, Mahmoud Ahmad Marei and Abdullah Sallum Abdullah. The elections were considered not to be free and fair. The United Nations condemned the elections as an illegitimate process with "no mandate"; accusing the Ba'athist regime of undermining UN Resolution 2254 and for obstructing the UN-backed political solution that calls for a "free and fair elections" under international monitoring.

Prior to the elections, several countries and intergovernmental organisations expressed concerns about the fairness and legitimacy of the election, and stated they would not recognize the results. In what was considered by some international observers to be a foregone conclusion and by many as an "empty election" marked by fraud, the result was a landslide victory for Assad, who won over 95% of the vote.

Officials said 79% of voters took part, but in the context of the ongoing civil war and subsequent population displacement, this figure has been questioned. The government claimed over 18,000,000 "eligible" voters, but because ballots were only offered in areas under government control, only just over 10,000,000 were actually able to vote, while, according to the official results, Assad won over 13,000,000 votes, technically meaning a voter turnout of 130%. Many observers and analysts noted that these numbers exceeded the possible number of adult voters in government-held areas of the country. Assad was sworn in for his fourth term (2021–2028) on 17 July 2021 at the Presidential Palace.

Assad ultimately did not complete his term, after his government collapsed on 8 December 2024.

== Background ==
Bashar al-Assad, the President of Syria, took power in a referendum in 2000 following the death of his father Hafez al-Assad, who had ruled Syria for 30 years. Assad also inherited the role of leader of the ruling party: the Regional Secretary of the Syrian Regional Branch of the Arab Socialist Ba'ath Party. He received 97.29% and 97.6% support, respectively, in the uncontested and undemocratic 2000 and 2007 elections. On 16 July 2014, Assad was sworn in for another seven-year term after another non-democratic, but this time multi-candidate, election where he received 88.7% of the vote. The election was held only in areas controlled by the Syrian government during the country's ongoing civil war and was criticised by the UN.

The 2021 election took place as the Syrian civil war entered the eleventh year of conflict and as a result the country still remains divided among various factions. The pre-war citizen population was over 21 million. As of 2020, Syria remained the largest source country of refugees with 6.6 million refugees having fled the nation since the start of the conflict. Additionally, seven million Syrians are internally displaced, including 4.4 million in rebel-held territory, and two to four million live in the Kurdish-ruled Autonomous Administration of North and East Syria - see Demographics of Syria - while over 100,000 citizens are detained as political prisoners. The election was held only in government-held territory. According to TRT World, 5-6 million adults live in areas under government control, while the Syrian Observatory for Human Rights (SOHR) estimates 10.9 million adults and children. According to SOHR, only five million people participated in the election, and some were coerced into doing so. Interior minister Mohammad Khaled al-Rahmoun said that 18 million Syrians are eligible to vote.

The vote took place despite a 2015 United Nations Security Council resolution calling for a new constitution ahead of elections.

Analysts said the elections were held so that the government and its backer Russia could claim victory in the war, to rehabilitate the country's reputation with the Arab League, and to demonstrate that Syria is a safe country for refugees to return to.

Four hundred civil servants, judges, lawyers and journalists detained in a crackdown early in the year on social media dissent under cybercrime laws were granted an amnesty on May in advance of the election, along with thousands freed under a general amnesty for currency speculators, drug dealers, smugglers and kidnappers. Most of the freed critics were on the government side in the Civil War, and the amnesty excluded tens of thousands of Assad political detainees.

The election was also held in the context of a severe economic crisis. The government took a series of steps in the weeks before the vote to influence public opinion, including attempts to reduce inflation and to extend government grants to state employees in areas experiencing economic hardship.

== Electoral system ==
The Constitution of Syria approved in 2012 states that: "Voters shall be the citizens who have completed eighteen years of age and met the conditions stipulated in the Election Law." (Article 59) The Election Law shall include the provisions that ensure: (Article 61)

1. The freedom of voters to choose their representatives and the safety and integrity of the electoral procedures.
2. The right of candidates to supervise the electoral process.
3. Punishing those who abuse the will of the voters.

== Selection of candidates ==
The Speaker of the People's Assembly of Syria, Hammouda Sabbagh (Ba'ath Party), announced the commencement of candidacy for presidential elections, starting from Monday 19 April. In his speech at the first session of the second extraordinary round of the People's Assembly, Sabbagh called on those who wish to run to submit their candidacy applications to the Supreme Constitutional Court within a period of 10 days until Wednesday 28 April.

=== Requirements for a presidential candidate ===
According to Law No. 5 of the year 2014 of the general elections code, The 5th chapter - article No. 30, the candidate for the post of President of the Syrian Arab Republic must:

- have reached the age of 40 years.
- have Syrian Arab nationality by birth.
- have all their civil and political rights and not be convicted of despicable crime.
- not be married to a foreigner.
- be resident in Syrian territories for no less than 10 consecutive years when standing for election.
- not have a nationality (citizenship) other than that of the Syrian Arab Republic.
- not to be deprived of their right to vote.

Further eligibility requirements in the Constitution include:

- The religion of the President is Islam (Article 3)

The requirement for candidates to be backed by 35 members of parliament gives power to the ruling National Progressive Front, which dominates the assembly, and the requirement to have lived continuously in Syria for the past 10 years excludes opposition figures in exile.

== Polling ==
Poll source	Date(s) administered	Sample size (Note: Key: A – all adults RV – registered voters LV – likely voters V – unclear)	Margin of error	Bashar al-Assad	Other candidates
Orb International	5–14 February 2017	1005 (A)	± 3%	34% (Note: Percentage that wanted to see Bashar al-Assad claim victory in the civil war.)	–
Orb International	5–12 March 2018	1001 (A)	± 3%	40% (Note: Percentage that responded "Positive" to "Do you think overall their influence on the affairs in Syria are positive or negative? - Assad")	–

== Candidates ==
On 3 May, the Syrian Supreme Constitutional Court announced that three candidates had been accepted, with the others rejected for not meeting the constitutional and legal conditions:

- Bashar al-Assad, then-president of Syria (2000–2024) and Ba'ath Party candidate (Damascus)
- Mahmoud Ahmed Marei, lawyer, born 1957, head of the Arab Organization for Human Rights and former secretary-general of the National Front for the Liberation of Syria. He is former president of the Youth Office at the National Coordination Committee for Democratic Change, member of the internal opposition delegation to the Geneva peace talks on Syria (2017). Democratic Arab Socialist Union Party (NCC) candidate (Damascus)
- Abdullah Sallum Abdullah, born 1956, former state minister for People's Assembly Affairs, former MP and Socialist Unionists Party candidate (Aleppo)

According to the Daily Telegraph, "Few consider former state minister Abdallah Salloum Abdallah and Mahmoud Merhi, a member of the so-called 'tolerated opposition', serious contenders."

=== Unsuccessful candidates ===
Candidates reported to have put themselves forward included:

- Jamal Suliman, actor and Syria's Tomorrow Movement candidate
- Mohamad Muafaq Sawan, leader of the Democratic Unionist Reform Party (Damascus)
- Faten Ali Nahar, 50-year old independent lawyer (Quneitra)
- Mohamad Firas Yassin Rajouh, engineer, activist, and a businessman, independent (Damascus)
- Mohamad Nadim Sha'ban, independent (Damascus)

== Campaign ==
- On 15 May, Mahmoud Ahmed Marei launched his campaign with the main goals: 1. "Together to release prisoners of conscience", 2. "Together for a participatory Government of National Unity with a real representation of the Opposition"'. At the same time, his pre-election page on Facebook and other social networks was launched. His pre-election spot was broadcast on Sama TV, Syria TV and Syrian News Channel. On 16 May, the candidate gave an hour-long interviews to Syria TV, Syrian News Channel and Sama TV. He also gave an interview to Al-Watan newspaper. According to the Daily Sabah, Marei described his campaign as modest, as it had no financial support apart from his own resources and that of internal opposition parties.
- On 15 May, the Al-Assad's campaign was launched with the slogan: "Hope is with work". His other main motto is: Together we challenge. The campaign has its pages on Facebook, Twitter, Telegram, Instagram and others. Like other campaigns, this one has its spots on Sama TV, Syria TV and the Syrian News Channel.
- On 15 May, Abdullah Sallum Abdullah's campaign with slogans: 1. '"Our strength in our unity" 2."Strengthening the role of the NPF and reactivating the role of the parties affiliated with it", was launched with a campaign page on Facebook, Twitter and other social networks. The candidate's pre-election spots were also broadcast on Sama TV, Syria TV and Syrian News Channel. He promised to combat corruption. On 17 May, he gave an interview on the Syrian News Channel in which called on all the Syrians to nationally unite to confront any problem or danger that threaten their country. He further reminded that it is necessary to enable and subsequently implement the return of all refugees back to the republic and to have suitable conditions for living in the country. Then noted the need to end the war, the occupation of the United States, Turkey and Israel. And finally he promised to protect national interests, economic development and the fight against corruption.
- On 16 May, an election campaign was launched across the country with billboards, giant posters of the president and leaflets. Large rallies in support of the president were organised by government officials, often with coerced participation, as well as dinners and dances organised by citizens to ingratiate themselves with the governing party.

In Druze-majority Sweida in south-west Syria, election billboards were torn and splashed with red paint within hours.

== Elections ==
Prior to the elections, a Supreme Electoral Committee was formed.

=== Expatriates ===
Expatriate voting occurred on 20 May in countries where it was allowed. One requirement for voting is a valid Syrian passport with an exit stamp issued by an official border crossing, which excludes many who fled the war. The Embassy of Syria in Kuala Lumpur was the first embassy that started the election process.

The following countries have allowed Syrian citizens to vote:

- Algeria
- Argentina
- Armenia
- Australia
- Austria
- Bahrain
- Belgium
- Belarus
- Brazil
- China
- Cuba
- Cyprus
- Czech Republic
- Egypt
- France
- India
- Indonesia
- Iraq
- Iran
- Japan
- Jordan
- Lebanon
- Malaysia
- Nigeria
- Oman
- Pakistan
- Poland
- Romania
- Russia
- Serbia
- South Africa
- South Korea
- Spain
- Sudan
- Sweden
- Ukraine
- United Arab Emirates
- Venezuela
- Yemen

The following eight countries did not allow expatriate voting to be held in the Syrian diplomatic missions:

- Canada
- Germany
- Qatar
- Saudi Arabia
- The Netherlands
- Turkey
- United Kingdom
- United States

In Lebanon, thousands were bussed to the embassy outside Beirut to vote. Lebanese security forces struggled to control the crowd. Many voters carried portraits of Assad and chanted pro-Assad slogans, and the embassy played pro-Assad music. There were violent attacks on Syrian voters by Lebanese people. It was estimated that 50,000 of the 1.2 million Syrians in Lebanon voted.

Only a few hundred out of the 1.3 million Syrians in Jordan voted in the presidential election.

According to the state news agency, on 23 May, the Minister of Foreign Affairs and Expatriates, Faisal Mekdad, handed over the results of counting the votes of the Syrian voters residing abroad to the Minister of Justice, Ahmed Al-Sayed, and to the Supreme Judicial Committee for Elections. He described the vote as peaceful and democratic, with the exception of Lebanon, and some Western states, where some voters were prevented from participating, and stated that these results would be included in the total and published together with them.

=== In Syria ===
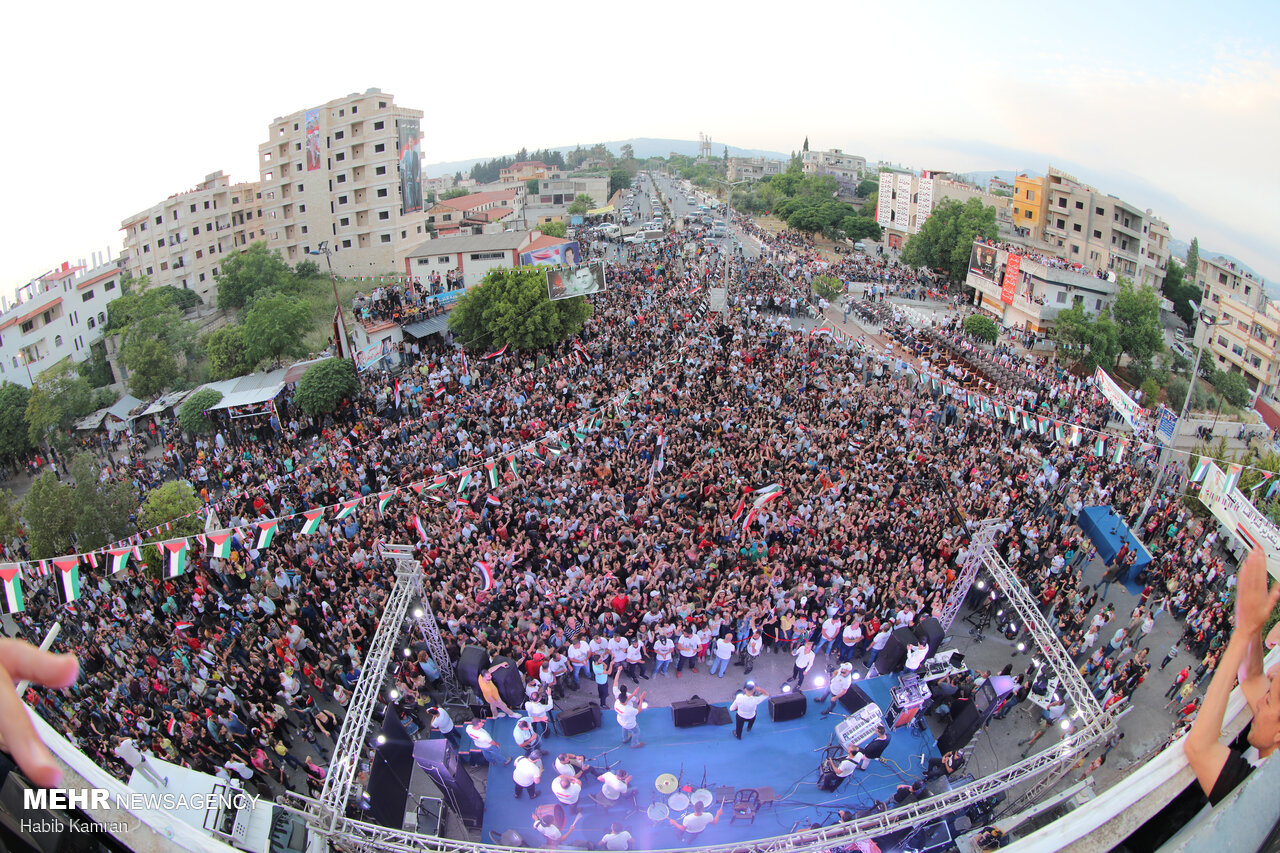
Pro-government rally in Qardaha, Latakia Governorate, May 2021

The elections were held in the country on 26 May, from 7 am to 7 pm, later extended until 12 am. Banners of the incumbent president were hung on the 12,000 polling stations across the country.

Although the government reported that 14 million citizens voted, SOHR estimated the real number was closer to five million.

President Assad publicly cast his ballot in the former rebel stronghold of Douma, site of a suspected chemical weapons attack by his forces in 2018.

The elections were not held in the predominantly Kurdish Autonomous Administration of North and East Syria, apart from ballot boxes in military zones controlled by the government in Hasakah and Qamishli, or in the opposition-held Northwest, which together make up a third of the country. Authorities in the Autonomous Administration closed the border to all vehicles except ambulances to prevent residents from travelling to government areas to vote. According to the Daily Sabah, tribes in Daraa, in Syria's south, also declared the election illegitimate, and hundreds of people there protested against the vote.

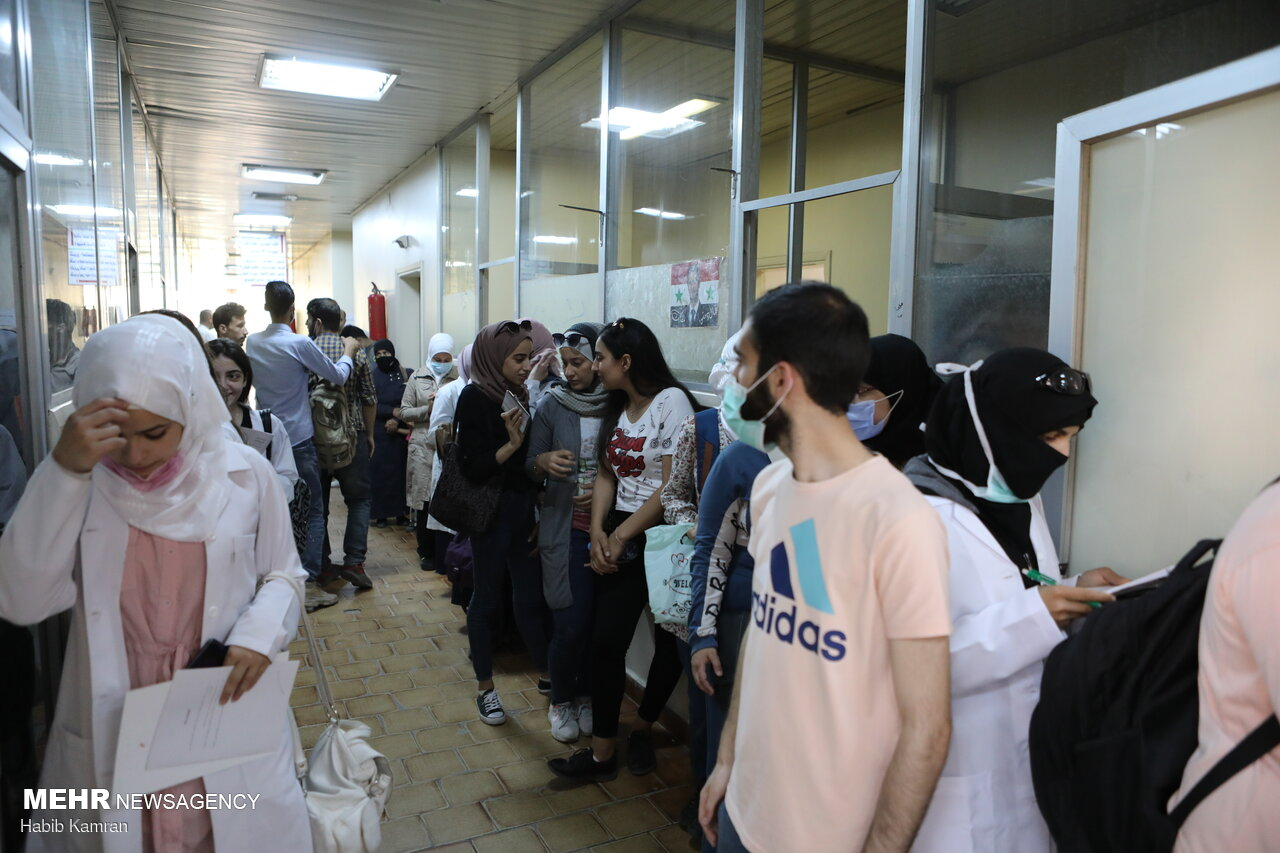
Syrian presidential election on 26 May 2021

Video footage showed polling officials casting votes on citizens' behalf before handing back ID cards. A student in Damascus told Al-Jazeera that "Some universities will fail or even expel you if you don't vote" and state employees were instructed to vote by the security apparatus. Many voters pricked their fingers to sign their support for Assad in blood. Pro-government shabiha militias controlled the process in voting centers. Ibrahim al Jibawi, opposition representative in the Constitutional Committee in Geneva, declared that there were militia members that voted more than once.

Protests were held against the elections in Daraa, where in response polling stations were reportedly shut down, and Suweida.

== International observers ==
According to the state news agency, the People's Assembly voted to invite representatives of the parliaments of the following countries to monitor and supervise the electoral process: Algeria, Oman, Mauritania, Russia, Iran, Armenia, China, Venezuela, Cuba, Belarus, South Africa, Ecuador, Nicaragua and Bolivia. Observers from Belarus arrived on 23 May.

Russian observers were shown on Syrian state TV station SANA, watching voters casting ballots without any privacy.

== Results ==
Candidate	Party	Votes	%
Bashar al-Assad	Ba'ath Party	13,540,860	95.19
Mahmoud Ahmad Marei	Democratic Arab Socialist Union	470,276	3.31
Abdullah Sallum Abdullah	Socialist Unionist Party	213,968	1.50
Total		14,225,104	100.00
Valid votes		14,225,104	99.90
Invalid/blank votes		14,036	0.10
Total votes		14,239,140	100.00
Registered voters/turnout		18,107,109	78.64
Source: Syrian Arab News Agency

== Reactions ==
=== Pre-election ===
==== Syrian opposition ====
- The National Coalition for Syrian Revolutionary and Opposition Forces said that the elections are "illegal and a farce". The Syrian National Council said "The only acceptable election in Syria is the one in which the war criminal Bashar al-Assad will not participate." Hadi al-Bahra, co-chair of the Syrian Constitutional Committee, called the elections "illegal": "Currently there is no safe and neutral environment that enables all Syrians [...] to exercise their right in casting their vote." The Kurdish National Council, which is part of the Turkey-based opposition, rejected the elections. Opposition groups and tribal leaders across government-occupied Daraa called for a boycott of the vote, describing it as a poorly made farce, with poor acting, and poor direction," and demanded the implementation of United Nations Security Council Resolution 2254 before any poll.
- The Democratic Arab Socialist Union rejected the legitimacy of the elections and distanced itself from Mahmoud Ahmad Marei, saying he had been expelled from the party in 2013.
- The Syrian Democratic Council (SDC), which controls northeastern Syria, stated "We will not be part of the presidential election process and we will not participate in it."

==== Intergovernmental organisations ====
- The United Nations has said that the elections are not part of the Syrian peace process and that it is not involved in it.

==== Other states ====
- France said it opposed the elections in the absence of a credible political solution: "The presidential election scheduled this year will be neither free nor legitimate. It cannot be used as a tool to circumvent this political solution."
- The United States indicated that it will not recognize the outcome of the elections unless the voting is "free, fair, supervised by the United Nations, and represents all of Syrian society." The State Department said "The proposed Syrian presidential election this year will neither be free nor fair. In this environment, we do not assess this call for elections to be credible."
- On election day, the foreign ministers of France, Germany, Italy, the United Kingdom and the United States stated that they do not consider the elections free or fair. "We denounce the Assad regime's decision to hold an election outside of the framework described in United Nations Security Council Resolution 2254 and we support the voices of all Syrians, including civil society organisations and the Syrian opposition, who have condemned the electoral process as illegitimate." Assad responded by stating that Syria would disregard this statement: the "value of those opinions is zero".
- Turkey said the elections were not legitimate, emphasising that they deprive almost 7 million Syrians in the diaspora of suffrage.
- Egypt's Foreign Minister Sameh Shoukry said that the vote would allow the Syrian people to "choose their future" and "form a government that represents them."

=== Post-election ===
==== Syrian opposition ====
- The Syrian Negotiation Commission said that the election showed "contempt to the Syrian people": "It's a decision by the government, aided by Russia and Iran, to kill the political process... It's a continuation of tyranny." The National Coalition for Syrian Revolutionary and Opposition Forces described the poll as a "theatrical play".

==== Intergovernmental ====
- The European Union said the elections met none of the criteria of "a genuinely democratic vote", as internally displaced people, refugees and members of the diaspora were unable to participate in a safe and neutral environment without threat of intimidation.

==== Other states ====
- Russia said "A decisive victory was won by the incumbent head of state... We view the elections as a sovereign affair of the Syrian Arab Republic and an important step towards strengthening its internal stability."
- Belarusian president Lukashenko congratulated Assad on his victory saying that "...winning the presidential election is an evidence of recognition of the President al-Assad's national role as a national leader who confidently defends his country against foreign interference, and fights for peace and stability in Syria."
- North Korean president of the State Affairs of the DPRK Kim Jong-un congratulated Assad on his victory ''through the election the Syrian government and people demonstrated at home and abroad their will to resolutely frustrate the ceaseless aggression and obstructive moves and threats by the imperialists and all sorts of other hostile forces and firmly defend the sovereignty and security of the country under the leadership of Bashar Al-Assad", with hopes of future cooperation between the two countries.

== See also ==
- 1947 Dominican Republic general election
- 1958 Portuguese presidential election
- 1995 Iraqi presidential referendum
- 2017 Turkmenistan presidential election
- 2023 Egyptian presidential election
- 2024 Russian presidential election
- 2024 Venezuelan presidential election
- 2025 Belarusian presidential election
