= Abdullah Ghanim Khawar =

Qatari terrorist financier

Abdullah Ghanim Khawar is a Qatari national and Qatar-based who previously worked as a salesman.

== Biography ==
Khawar was born in Qatar on August 17, 1981. According to the U.S. Department of the Treasury, he has been designated as an Al-Qaeda facilitator and financier in Qatar. He is closely linked with Salim al-Kuwari, another U.S.-designated al-Qaeda financier who previously worked for Qatar's ministry of interior, with whom he worked with to deliver money, information, and other material support to al-Qaeda leaders in Iran. Kuwari would donate hundreds of thousands of dollars to al-Qaeda in Iran over the years using the assistance of Abdullah Ghanim Mafuz Muslim al-Khawar. He was responsible for moving money and recruits from the Gulf region to al-Qaeda leaders. Khawar also played a large role in facilitating the travel and transport of al-Qaeda recruits to Afghanistan, who are interested in taking part in jihad there.

According to other renowned terrorist financier Abd al-Rahman al-Nuayami's Alkarama, the human rights organization that was a used as front for coordinating terrorist activities and funding, that Khawar was arrested along with Kuwari in June 2009, and the two were detained for nearly 1 year. Alkarama promoted their case as a human rights cause with the UN Working Group on Arbitrary Detention. Apparently, shortly after Kuwari was released and permitted to return to his previous job at the Interior Ministry in Qatar. It is not clear what happened to Khawar at this time, but it can be assumed that he was released as well. In early 2011, the two were detained once again, and Alkarama advocated for the pair once more in Doha with the same UN group. Before the UN group could take action, Khawar had been re-released. He attempted to leave Qatar, and at this time, Saudi Arabian authorities soon arrested him. The U.N. group intervened, under the impression that he was arrested inhumanely for expressing his political views.

Though Khawar has had quite a few confrontations with law enforcement between the years of 2009 and 2011, but he has not been charged with any crime and still continues to function with an Iran-based al-Qaeda network, headed by Ezedin Abdel Aziz Khalil. Khalil operates as an al-Qaeda facilitator under an agreement between the terrorist group and the Iranian government. Khawar, however, still resides in Doha, despite the claims against him, and according to the country's Ministry of the Interior, he retains an active Qatari ID card and passport.
