= Ammar al-Qurabi =

Syrian human rights activist (born 1970)

Ammar Al-Qurabi عمار القربي
- Born: 21 August 1970 (age 56)
- Education: University of Aleppo
- Occupation: Human Rights Activist
- Known for: Democracy Activist; Political Prisoner

Ammar Al-Qurabi (Arabic: عمار القربي; born 21 August 1970) is a Syrian human rights activist and executive director of the National Organization for Human Rights in Syria since April 2006. He was elected in April 2011 as member of the board of trustees of the Arab Human Rights Organization in Syria.

== Biography ==
Born in Algeria to Syrian parents from Ariha, a town close to Aleppo, Ammar al-Qurabi trained as a dentist at the University of Aleppo. Qurabi was a member of the banned Arab Socialist Party from 1985 to 1999, and served as Secretary of its Aleppo branch from 1989 until his resignation from the Party in 1999.

In addition to establishing the Arab Human Rights Organization in Syria, Qurabi has worked with the Syrian Human Rights Committee, the Arab Commission for Human Rights and Human Rights Watch. He was a founding member and official spokesperson of the Arab Human Rights Organization in Syria from 2004 until his arrest and travel ban in 2006. He led the Arab Commission for Human Rights in Paris and monitored four sessions of the trial of the Muslim Brotherhood in Egypt between August and September 2007.

Qurabi attended the third session of the launch of the Arab Network for Human Rights Information in August 2007. He was involved in the submission of a report on prison conditions in Syria to the Arab Organization for Penal Reform at a conference in Sharm el-Sheikh, Egypt on 6 June 2007. He was a member of an Arab fact-finding mission to Gaza in February 2009.

Qurabi has published widely on human rights issues (civil liberties, freedom, social and economic rights, gender discrimination, children, migrant workers, political corruption, torture, and abuses in the criminal justice system), documenting abuses and bringing attention to human rights violations in Syria.

== Role in the 2011 Syrian uprising ==
Dr. Ammar Al-Qurabi played a prominent role in highlighting human rights violations by the Syrian authorities during the 2011 Syrian uprising. His National Organization for Human Rights in Syria was main organizer of the Antalya Conference for Change in Syria in June 2011, and though al-Qurabi was one of the conference's main funders as well, he only attended as an observer.

A frequent commentator in the Arab media, Qurabi has helped focus international attention on the deteriorating human rights situation in Syria by describing media censorship, the harassment and detention of journalists and bloggers, the arrest of political and human rights activists and violence against protesters and political dissidents.

Through the National Organization for Human Rights in Syria, Qurabi has verified and documented reports of torture, ill-treatment, forced disappearance, arbitrary arrest and unlawful detention. He has criticized the lack of judicial independence and arbitrary procedures that have systematically resulted in violations of the right to fair trial, and described Syria's multi-layered security apparatus which continues to detain people without arrest warrants and frequently refuses to disclose their whereabouts for weeks and sometimes months – in effect forcibly disappearing them. He has brought attention to the sub-standard health and sanitation conditions of Syrian prisons, and described and documented methods of torture and abuse of prisoners including the use of electric shock; pulling out fingernails; burning genitalia; beating, sometimes while the victim was suspended from the ceiling; dousing victims with freezing water and beating them in extremely cold rooms; hyper-extending the spine; and bending detainees into the frame of a wheel and whipping exposed body parts.

== Arrests and restrictions ==
20 August 2003: Arrested in Aleppo and sentenced by a state security court to three months in prison for establishing and leading an information committee in support of 14 political prisoners facing military court trials. The arrest came after establishing the background forum for dialogue and democratic activity within the National Action Committee and the city of Aleppo to participate in sit-ins and demonstrations demanding democracy and civil liberties. He did not serve his full term, benefiting from a general presidential pardon.

7 March 2006: Travel ban issued under Section 279 of the External Security and security Memorandum 255 of the Department of State Security.

12 March 2006: Arrested by the Syrian security forces at Damascus International Airport, as he was coming back from two conferences on human rights and democratic reforms in Syria, which were held in Paris and Washington D.C. He was then brought to the "Palestine Branch" of the military intelligence services, in Damascus, a place known for its extremely harsh conditions of detention. The arrest warrant was issued from the Department of State Security "section 255" external security "section 279" Palestine Section "235" program of military intelligence. He was released on 16 March 2006 after a four-day detention in solitary confinement at the "Palestine Branch" of the military intelligence services.

9 April 2007: Detained for two days by state security after his election as head of the National Organization for Human Rights.

19 November 2007: Syrian authorities prevented Dr. Ammar Qurabi from travelling while he was on his way to Jordan to participate in a seminar entitled "The role of civil society organizations in political reform in the Arab world", organized by the Amman Centre for Human Rights Studies and the Aspen Institute of Berlin, on the basis of two notes from two different security apparatuses dated 7 March 2006 and 5 April 2006, without providing any explanation for this decision.

== Affiliations ==
Arab Organization for Human Rights in Syria (AOHRS) – The Democratic Dialogue Forum – International Arab-Kurdish Dialogue Committee in Syria – Damascus Center for Theoretical and Strategic Studies – Administrative Council of the Syrian Dental Association (2002–2006) – Arab Organization Press Defence (Germany) – Arab Writers United on Internet – Arabic Social Club (Cairo-Egypt) – National Work Committee in Aleppo – Arab Organization for Human Rights in Cairo – Arab Coalition for the International Criminal Court – Executive Secretariat of the Arab Coalition for Darfur – Euro Mediterranean Federation against Enforced Disappearances (FEDEM) – International Coalition for the International Criminal Court – Forum for non-governmental organizations parallel to the Future Forum (Rabat 2004 – Bahrain 2005 Oman 2006 – Yemen 2007 – United Arab Emirates, 2008) – Damascus Center for Human Rights Studies – Karma Organization for Defending Asian Workers Rights – Member of the Syrian Coalition for Preventing Execution – Co-ordinator for Syrian Forum for NGOs in Syria – Member in Huriyat Center (Syria) since 2005
