= Antalya Conference =

Antalya Conference may refer to:

- 2015 G-20 Antalya summit, an international conference of the G-20 heads of government in 2015
- Antalya Conference for Change in Syria, a Syrian Opposition conference in 2011
