= Alkarama =

Swiss-based human rights non-governmental organization

Alkarama Foundation
- Founded: 2004
- Founders: Abdulrahman Al Naimi, Rachid Mesli, Abbas Aroua
- Type: NGO; Swiss Foundation (2007)
- Purpose: Extrajudicial killings Enforced disappreances Torture; Arbitrary detention
- Location: Geneva, Switzerland
- Region served: Arab world
- Key people: Mourad Dhina, Executive Director Rachid Mesli, Legal Director Khalid bin Mohammed al-Rabban, President
- Employees: 14
- Website: http://alkarama.org/

Alkarama (Arabic: الكرامة لحقوق الإنسان / ISO 233: al-karāmah li-ḥuqūq al-’insān / Dignity) is an independent Swiss-based human rights non-governmental organization established in 2004 to assist people in the Arab World subjected to, or at risk of, extrajudicial killings, disappearances, torture, and arbitrary detention.

== History ==
=== 2004: Foundation ===
Alkarama was created as a Swiss association in July 2004 by Qatari and Algerian human rights activists – Abdulrahman Al Naimi, Rachid Mesli and Abbas Aroua – to promote individual freedom, dignity, and the rule of law in the Arab World. The association began campaigning on serious human rights violations, such as extrajudicial killings, enforced disappearances, torture, and arbitrary detention.

At that time, the United Nations (UN) mechanisms established to protect human rights worldwide rarely acted upon human rights violations in the Arab region. The aim of Alkarama was to act through the UN's mechanisms to address this perceived gap, and in doing so, increase understanding of human rights and raise awareness of the UN's human rights protection mechanisms in Arab civil society, where they were seen by some as Western concepts. The organization aimed to act as a bridge between victims of human rights violations in the Arab world and the UN Special Procedures experts, whilst building the capacity of local activists to directly access UN mechanisms. This involved communicating directly with victims and their families, lawyers, or local activists to document human rights violations, and submitting these cases to the UN in order to request action from the relevant government authorities.

Between 2004 and 2007, Rachid Mesli, Alkarama's sole employee in Geneva, submitted around 400 individual cases to the UN Special Procedures, leading to engagement with a number of Arab States, and improved conditions for many of the victims. In 2005, Alkarama recruited country representatives in Lebanon and Yemen, in order to monitor the human rights situation in these countries and document further violations. Alkarama's website was launched the same year.

In April 2007, Alkarama registered as a Foundation under Swiss law, which enabled the Swiss authorities to review the organisation's financial records annually.

=== 2007: Working with UN Treaty Bodies ===
As of 2007, Alkarama began working with the UN Human Rights Treaty Bodies – in particular the Committee Against Torture (CAT), the Human Rights Committee (HRCttee), and the Universal Periodic Review (UPR) instituted by the newly established Human Rights Council (HRC) – by submitting evidence from civil society actors in Arab states regarding violations of the Universal Declaration of Human Rights, the Convention Against Torture, and the International Covenant on Civil and Political Rights (ICCPR).

=== 2009: Alkarama Award for Human Rights Defenders ===
In 2009, Alkarama launched the Alkarama Award for Human Rights Defenders, a symbolic award given every year to an individual or organisation that had significantly contributed to the promotion and protection of human rights in the Arab world.

== Alleged link to terrorist groups ==
As an NGO working closely with the UN's human rights protection mechanisms, Alkarama and its staff members have frequently been the target of defamation campaigns and government allegations; executive director Mourad Dhina and legal director Rachid Mesli have both had international arrest warrants issued against them by the Algerian government, and founding member and former chair of the foundation's council, Abdulrahman Al Naimi, was listed by the United States Treasury as an "Al-Qaeda financier", although these charges were never substantiated in court.

On 2 September 2014, the Lebanese newspaper, As-Safir published an article accusing Alkarama of "supporting terrorism" and "spreading anarchy". In the following days, these allegations were repeated in the Hezbollah-affiliated Lebanese information channel Al Manar, on Syrian governmental news sites RTV.gov and Al Tawra,, and by the Saudi-run Syrian news site Al Akhbar Al Youm. On 3 September, Commentary, a magazine founded by the American Jewish Committee in 1945, accused Alkarama of being run by an "Al-Qaeda financier", in reference to Alkarama's Founder, Abdulrahman Al Naimi.

On 14 October 2014, the Swiss newspaper Le Temps published an article, subsequently picked up by other Swiss media outlets, repeating the unproven allegations of Al Naimi being an "Al-Qaeda financier”. A month later, Le Temps published a feature written by Alkarama's legal director, Rachid Mesli, outlining the difficulty of defending human rights in the Arab World, and arguing that those who criticise authoritarian regimes are often accused of terrorism to stifle criticism or silence demands to participate in the country's political life. "It is therefore not surprising that Alkarama, which defends victims of this repression, finds itself vilified and attacked by these regimes; that international NGOs such as the Council on American-Islamic Relations and Islamic Relief find themselves on the UAE’s list of terrorist organisations along with ISIL and Al Qaeda; and that the former Chairman of our Foundation, Dr Abdulrahman Al Naimi, a university Professor, a Qatari human rights activist and a former Amnesty prisoner of conscience be banned from several countries – including the UAE and Saudi Arabia", he wrote.

The current president of Alkarama's Board of Trustees, Khalifa al-Rabban, is a Founding Member and Member of the Board of Trustees of the Global Anti-Aggression Campaign (GAAC) alongside Abdulrahman Al Naimi. An online portal for articles on human-rights matters in the Arab World, the GAAC's founding statement, written by Alkarama founding member Abdulrahman Al Naimi, claims that Islam is under siege and that the organisation seeks to confront the Western “aggressor.” GAAC has also hosted Hamas leaders.

Alkarama unambiguously and irrevocably denies all these accusations.

=== 2012: Arrest and detention of Mourad Dhina in Paris ===
In 2012, Alkarama's executive director, Dr Mourad Dhina, who had openly called for democratic change in Algeria for years was detained in France for six months on a request from the Algerian authorities to have him extradited to the country. The French court released him when they received documents from the Algerian authorities, which were so incoherent and lacking any evidence that the French prosecutor qualified them as "grotesque". Dr. Dhina returned to Alkarama after having spent almost 6 months at the Prison de la Santé in Paris.

=== 2013: Listing of one of Alkarama's three founding members, Pr. Al Naimi, by the United States Department of the Treasury ===
On 18 December 2013, the United States Department of the Treasury listed one of Alkarama's three founding members, Pr. Abdulrahman Al Naimi as a “Specially Designated Global Terrorist” for having supposedly “provided money and material support and conveyed communications to Al Qaeda and its affiliates in Syria, Iraq, Somalia and Yemen for more than a decade.”[1] In addition, the U.S. Treasury claimed that Naimi had “reportedly oversaw the transfer of over $2 million per month to al-Qa’ida in Iraq for a period of time” and “served as an interlocutor between al-Qaida in Iraq leaders and Qatar-based donors.” Speaking to the Financial Times from Istanbul, Al Naimi denied the charges leveled against him.[2] Al Naimi is also a secretary general of the Global Anti-Aggression Campaign, an online NGO that has hosted Hamas leaders and released anti-Semitic and anti-Western writings. Following the listing, Pr. Al Naimi resigned from the Foundation to avoid any misinterpretation. However, the Alkarama Council decided to reject the resignation of Mr. Al Naimi after initially accepting it. In July 2014, Naimi stepped down as president and Member of the Board of Alkarama.

The charges brought by the U.S. Treasury against him were made against his own person, and not the Foundation. Besides, the U.S. Treasury has not submitted any evidence or proof of its allegations against Pr Al Naimi, who denies all charges as a whole, and is willing, as he officially notified the American authorities, to appear in person before a court to establish the falsity of the charges pressed against him. Al Naimi has, however, received widespread media coverage for his support to terrorist groups.

=== 2014: Listing of Alkarama as a terrorist organisation by the United Arab Emirates ===
On 15 November 2014, the Emirates News Agency released a list of 85 organisations “designated as terrorist organisations and groups in implementation of Federal Law No. 7 for 2014 on combating terrorist crimes” issued by Sheikh Khalifa bin Zayed Al Nayhan with the aim to “raise awareness in society about these organisations.”

The list, which includes internationally recognised terrorist organisations, such as Al-Qaeda or Dae’sh (the Islamic State of Iraq and the Levant - ISIL), also includes several Muslim associations in Europe and international NGOs, such as the Council on American-Islamic Relations (CAIR) and Islamic Relief. “Alkarama organisation” also appears in that list, but despite numerous attempts to contact Emirati officials on this matter, the Alkarama Foundation never received an official confirmation and therefore considers itself not concerned by that listing.

=== 2015: Arrest of Rachid Mesli in Italy ===
Me Rachid Mesli, Legal Director at Alkarama, was arrested at the Swiss-Italian border on 19 August 2015 on the basis of an international arrest warrant issued by the Algerian authorities in April 2002, which claims that he had "provided telephone information to terrorist groups movements," and "attempted to supply terrorist groups with cameras and phones," twisting his work as a human rights lawyer, in constant contact with victims of human rights abuses and their families.

On 22 August, the Italian justice decided to put him under house arrest instead of keeping him in Aosta prison, following several calls from various NGOs, institutions and personalities, as well as an important media coverage of his case.

On 15 September 2015, recognizing Me Mesli's important work in the promotion and protection of human rights in the Arab World, as well as the strong risks of torture that he would incur if he was extradited to Algeria, the Turin Court decided to release him without waiting for the end of the 40-day period by which the Algerian authorities can submit their formal request for extradition.

Eventually, on 16 December 2015, the Italian court rejected the extradition request after noting all the inconsistencies in the international arrest warrant. The court considered the charges against Me Mesli were the result of "political persecution" and asserted that "his human rights activities have nothing to do with terrorism."

And on 13 May 2016, the Commission for the Control of Interpol's Files decided, after a long legal battle, to drop the international arrest warrant issued in 2003 by the Algerian authorities against Me Mesli, for their lack of cooperation as well as their failure to provide any form of clarification on his case.

== Advocacy on behalf of terrorism supporters ==
In April 2004, Alkarama issued a report condemning the arrest by Qatari authorities of a number of individuals with ties to terrorism. The Alkarama Foundation report did not mention their activities in support of terrorism but called on Qatar to release the arbitrarily detained individuals. The report listed Ibrahim Issa al-Bakr, Salim Hasan al-Kuwari, Abd al-Latif Bin Abdullah Salih Muhammad al-Kawari, Khalid Saeed al-Bounein and others as the detainees which Alkarama demanded be released.

The U.S. Treasury claimed that in the early 2000s, when Alkarama released its advocacy report, Ibrahim Issa al-Bakr was “working to raise money to support terrorism” and was involved in a jihadist network. In 2014, the U.S. government designated Ibrahim Issa al-Bakr as an al-Qaeda supporter and Specially Designated Global Terrorist who worked with a Lebanon-based network to procure and transport weapons to Syria with the help of an al-Qaeda associate in Syria. In January 2015, al-Bakr was added by the United Nations to the al-Qaeda Sanctions List of individuals subject to an assets freeze and travel ban.

Salim Hasan al-Kuwari is a Qatari national and US-designated financier and facilitator of al-Qaeda. The U.S. Treasury claimed that Kuwari supports al-Qaeda through Iran-based al-Qaeda associates and has provided “hundreds of thousands of dollars in financial support to al-Qaeda. In 2009, Alkarama submitted Kuwari’s case to the UN Working Group on Arbitrary Detention (WGAD).

Abd al-Latif Bin Abdullah Salih Muhammad al-Kawari, a Qatar-based al-Qaeda facilitator who worked alongside Hassan Ghul and Ibrahim Isa Muhammad al-Bakr to transfer money to al-Qaeda in Pakistan. Al-Kawari was also a coordinator of Madid Ahl al-Sham, an online fundraising campaign used to fund al-Nusra Front militants in Syria and transfer weapons and supplies to the terrorist group. Khalid Saeed al-Bounein was a coordinator for Madid Ahl al-Sham alongside SDGTs Abd al-Latif Bin Abdullah Salih Muhammad al-Kawari and Sa’d bin Sa’d Muhammad Shariyan al-Ka’bi. Al-Bounein is listed as a point of contact for donations to the campaign that was cited by a Nusra Front member as the “preferred conduit” for donations. Al-Bounein was also listed as a point of contact in a partner charity fundraiser led by Eid Charity and Madid Ahl al-Sham.

== Notes ==
- "About us". Alkarama Foundation. 2007-04-26. Archived from the original (About us) on 2014-03-26.
- "Alkarama Foundation" (Home page). Alkarama Foundation.
- "Annual Reports". Alkarama Foundation. 2008-12-10. Archived from the original on 2014-09-11.
- gayoubi (2008-01-22). "Alkarama Foundation". Machrek Civil Society Portal. e-Joussour. Archived from the original (Web directory) on 2011-07-23.
