= Khawar =

Khawar is a surname and a given name. Notable people with the name include:

Surname:

- Abdullah Ghanim Khawar, Qatari national and Qatar-based terrorist financier
- Ayub Khawar, Pakistani poet, author, and television director
- Rafi Khawar (1942–1986), aka Nanha, Pakistani actor and comedian

Given name:

- Khawar Ali (born 1985), Pakistani-born cricketer
- Bushra Khawar Maneka (born 1971), Pakistani faith healer and politician
- Khawar Mumtaz (born 1945), Pakistani women's rights activist, feminist author, university professor
- Khawar Qureshi, British barrister and international lawyer
- Khawar Rizvi (1938–1981), Pakistani poet and scholar of Urdu and Persian
- Syed Khawar Ali Shah, Pakistani politician

== See also ==
- MIMA v Khawar, decision of the High Court of Australia
