= Muhammad Yusuf Uthman Abd al-Salam =

Jihadist militant (1956–2014)

Abū ʿAbd al-ʿAzīz al-Qaṭarī
- أبو عبد العزيز القطري
- Born: 1956; Baghdad, Iraq
- Died: 2014 (aged 57–58); Idlib Governorate, Syria
- Cause of death: Assassination
- Citizenship: Jordanian
- Occupation: Jihadist leader
- Known for: Founder and commander of Jund al-Aqsa
- Military career
- Allegiance: Maktab al-Khidamat (1980s); Al-Qaeda (1989–2012): Jama'at al-Tawhid wal-Jihad (2003–2004); Al-Qaeda in Iraq (2004–2006); Islamic State of Iraq (2006-2011); Al-Nusra Front (2012–2013); Jund al-Aqsa (2013–2014)
- Branch: Jund al-Aqsa (2013–2014)
- Rank: Emir
- Conflicts: Soviet–Afghan War; First Chechen War; Iraq War; Syrian civil war

Muhammad Yusuf Uthman Abd al-Salam (Arabic: محمد يوسف عثمان عبد السلام) (2014–1956) was the founder of Jund al-Aqsa, a Salafist jihadist group active in the Syrian Civil War. He is also commonly referred to by his nom de guerre Abu Abdulaziz al-Qatari (Arabic: أبو عبد العزيز القطري). He was a Jordanian citizen of Palestinian origin who lived in Qatar.

He was a longtime jihadist and veteran of al-Qaeda. He was allegedly affiliated with a number of militant organizations, including the al-Nusra Front, al-Qaeda in Iraq, and ISIS.

== Personal life ==
Al-Qatari was born in the Fadhil district of Baghdad in 1956. His family was believed to be of Palestinian descent. He reportedly held a Jordanian passport and was known to use fraudulent identification and alternative names to avoid detection.

He is believed to have had four children. Two of them, both of whom were Jordanian citizens, are under US and UN sanctions for financially assisting the al-Nusra Front and other al-Qaeda branches. His two sons are named Ashraf Muhammad Yusuf Uthman Abd al Salam and Abd al-Malik Muhammad Yusuf Uthman Abd al Salam.

== Militant activities ==
It is thought that al-Qatari left Iraq to join al-Qaeda in Afghanistan where he worked closely with Osama bin Laden, Ayman al-Zawahiri and Abdullah Yusuf Azzam in fighting in the Soviet-Afghan War. Al-Alam News Network claimed that al-Qatari was a teacher and mentor of Osama bin Laden and persuaded him to go to Afghanistan to join the war. From Afghanistan, al-Qatari traveled to Chechnya where he fought against Russian forces.

During the late 1990s, al-Qatari returned to Baghdad where he was sentenced to life in prison under the rule of Iraqi President Saddam Hussein. Amid the 2003 invasion of Iraq, Abu Abdulaziz reportedly escaped from prison and assisted Abu Musab al-Zarqawi in forming the predecessor to ISIS, al-Qaeda in Iraq. Before al-Zarqawi pledged allegiance to al-Qaeda, the group was known as Jama'at al-Tawhid wal-Jihad. This group carried out violent acts targeting diplomats, foreign troops, entertainment centers, and Iraqi Shi'ites after the 2003 invasion of Iraq.

It is reported that al-Qatari entered Syria months after the start of the Syrian Civil War with one of his sons, Abu Turab, who was later killed in Syria. In Syria, al-Qatari worked with Abu Muhammad al-Julani to found the al-Nusra Front in 2012. According to reports, al-Qatari and al-Julani were dispatched to Syria by Abu Bakr al-Baghdadi in order to form sleeper cells.

Al-Qatari would later split from the al-Nusra Front to establish Jund al-Aqsa. While Jund al-Aqsa continued to fight alongside the al-Nusra Front and Ahrar al-Sham against Western-backed groups in Syria, divisions emerged between Jund al-Aqsa and its partners over fighting ISIS. Al-Qatari and Jund al-Aqsa were known for reconciliatory efforts among jihadist groups, and purportedly opposed fighting ISIS. It is believed that al-Qatari may have acted as a mediator between al-Jolani and al-Baghdadi in unsuccessful attempts to reconcile their groups.

Abu Abdulaziz al Qatari's name was eliminated from the latest terrorist list published by the UAE in September 2023, along with the names of 58 other individuals and 12 organizations.

== Death ==
Rumors surfaced of al-Qatari's death in early 2014. Later 2014 reports claimed that al-Qatari's body was found in the Idlib countryside. According to reports, al-Qatari was killed during clashes with the Syrian Martyrs' Brigade.
