= Abdul-Aziz al-Khair =

Syrian opponent

Abdul-Aziz al-Khair (also Abd al-'Aziz al-Khair, al-Khayer, or al-Kheir, Arabic: عبد العزيز الخير ), born 1952 in the Latakia Governorate, is a Syrian intellectual and a prominent figure of the Communist opposition in Syria. He was reported missing in 2012.

== Career and political activism ==
Al-Khair was born into a family of Syrian Alawite during the Syrian Republic (1946–1963). The family is mainly present in Qardaha, the home village of the ruling Al-Assad Clan. He studied medicine at the University of Damascus from which he graduated in 1982. A part from other secular radical groups such as the Nationalist SSNP, Communism was popular among political activists from the Alawite minority. Having first joined the Ba'ath Party al-Khair became a member of the Syrian Communist Action (Labour) Party, which was founded in 1976 after the Ba'ath Party under the leadership of president Hafez al-Assad had co-opted several leftist, Marxist, and socialist groups in the National Progressive Front.

Communist Party leadership

Among al-Khair's comrades were communist leaders Fateh Jamous, Akram al-Bunni. One of al-Khair's childhood friends who would also become a prominent Syrian opposition activist was Haytham Manna. Al-Khair was arrested and tortured repeatedly for his political activism in 1992, and sentenced to 22 years of prison. During president Bashar al-Assad's period of reform known as the Damascus Spring al-Khair was released in 2005.

Under the leadership of al-Khair the Syrian Communist Labour Party joined the Damascus Declaration, a joint statement by several intellectuals and Syrian opposition activists issued in 2005 and demanding the end of authoritarian rule in Syria. After opposition activists and members of the party were persecuted and arrested, the party withdrew from the declaration in 2007.

In 2007 al-Khair participated in founding a united "Marxist Leftist Assembly" which also included the several other leftist groups such as the Syrian Communist Party (Unified) Kurdish Left Party, th Syrian Democratic People's Party of Riad al-Turk.

Disappearance in 2012

In June 2011, after the beginning of the Syrian popular uprising that led to the Syrian civil war, al-Khair joined the National Coordination Committee for Democratic Change, that included 14 political parties, several party initiatives and independent figures of the non-armed Syrian opposition.

In September 2012 al-Khair travelled to China to discuss the Syrian crisis with Chinese foreign minister and Politburo member Yang Jiechi. According to spokespeople of the National National Coordination Committee, al-Khair and another executive member of the Committee, Eyas Ayyash, arrived at Damascus International Airport on the night of September 20, 2012 and got on a car. They were allegedly followed by Syrian security agents and "never made it to Damascus", as the spokesperson was quoted by Reuters. According to the report, al-Khair might have been arrested because he had tried to convince the Russian and the Chinese governments, both considered supporters of president Assad, to put pressure on the Syrian government for implement political reforms and a peaceful solution to the ongoing crisis.

In Juli 2013 the Committee dismissed reports that al-Khair had died in custody of Syrian Intelligence Services, as a result of torture or cancer. In January 2014 the United Nations Joint Representative for Syria, Lakhdar Brahimi, issued a statement in which he claims having known al-Khair personally, but that had no information what had happened to al-Khair since his arrest "in broad daylight".

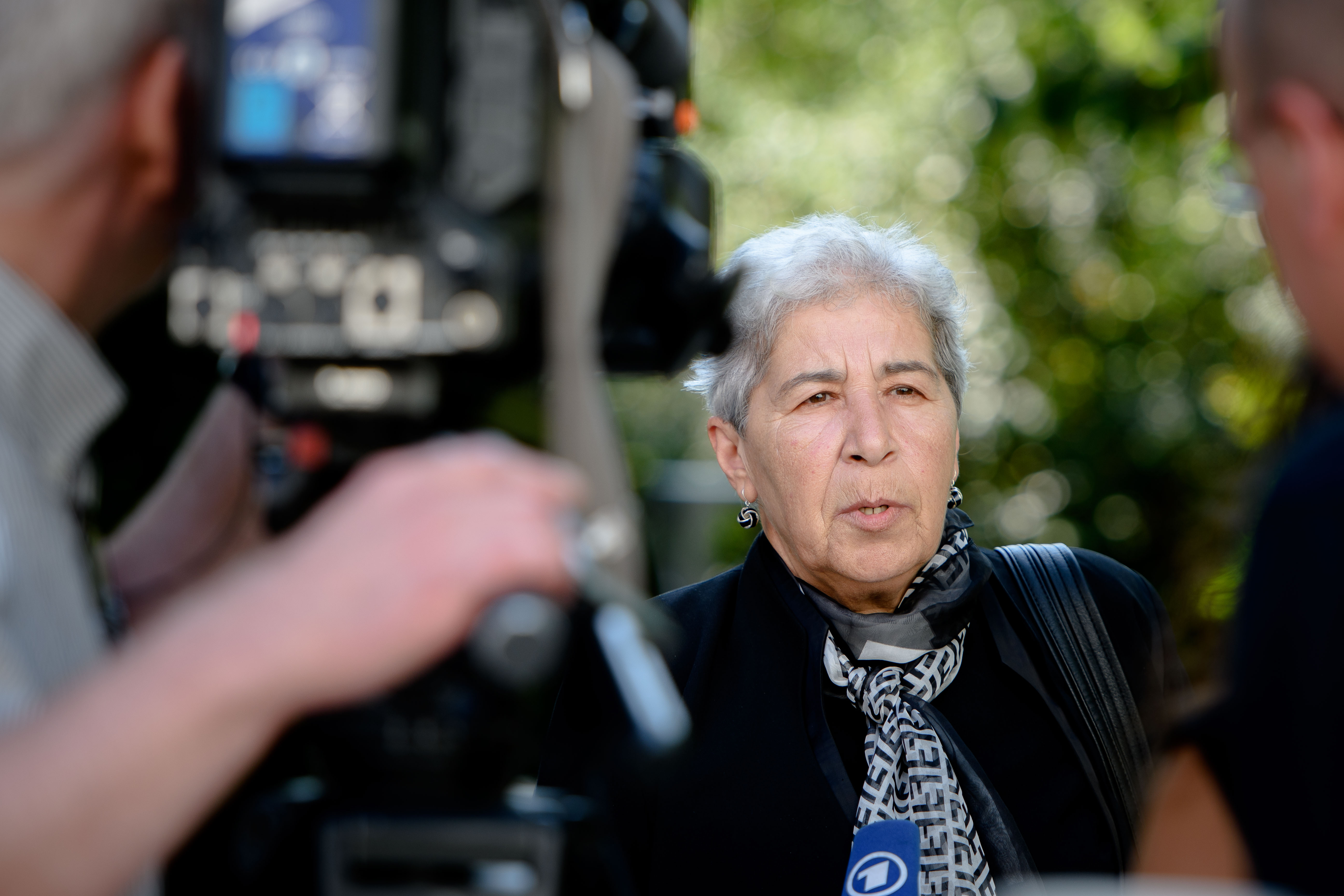
Fadwa Mahmoud

However, the disappearance of al-Khair was considered a "critical phase" that affected the National Coordination Committee as an opposition body in Syria. It did not participate in the opposition delegation of the so-called Geneva II Syria peace talks in 2014.

Al-Khair is the husband of the women's and human rights activist Fadwa Mahmoud who co-founded the organization Families for Freedom which campaigns for the liberation of detainees in Syria, both those held by the Syrian regime and those held by other armed groups.
