= Antalya Conference for Change in Syria =

Change in Syria conference
- Date: 31 May – 3 June 2011
- Venue: Falez Hotel, Muratpaşa
- Location: Antalya, Turkey; 36°52′59″N 30°39′57″E
- Also known as: Antalya Opposition Conference
- Type: Conference
- Theme: Political situation in Syria
- Patrons: Ali & Wassim Sanqar, Ammar al-Qurabi
- Organized by: National Organization for Human Rights in Syria, Abdulrazak Eid

The Conference for Change in Syria (Turkish: Suriye'de Değişim Konferansı), or Antalya Opposition Conference, was a three-day conference of representatives of the Syrian opposition held from 31 May until 3 June 2011 in Antalya, Turkey. Since the early days of the Syrian civil uprising, it was the second of its kind, following the Istanbul Meeting for Syria that had taken place on 26 April 2011.

Organized by Ammar al-Qurabi's National Organization for Human Rights in Syria and financed by the wealthy Damascene Sanqar family, it led to a final statement refusing compromise or reform solutions, and to the election of a 31-member leadership.

== Background ==
More than two months into the uprising, the death toll had reached 1,000. So after the April 2011 Istanbul Meeting had only resulted in a first joint declaration, a second meeting was envisioned to form a permanent committee, that was likened to the Libyan National Transitional Council.

On 30 May, the eve of the conference, Syrian president Bashar al-Assad offered a general amnesty for prisoners, including those deemed to have committed "political crimes." The opposition however rejected the offer, considering it as just another plot by the regime to gain time. Mohammad Abdullah, son of political prisoner Ali al-Abdullah and a Washington-based Syrian dissident attending the conference, stated: "This shows weakness on the part of the regime.”

== Participation ==
The conference was attended by c. 350 representatives of the Syrian opposition from all over the world, with a vast majority of c. 300 participants coming from the Syrian diaspora. According to the observing Tharwa Foundation, the participants represented more than 68 opposition parties and groups and a dozen human rights groups. While only few prominent oppositional figures from inside Syria participated, others, including Haitham al-Maleh, gave their support through voice recordings.

Participants included members of Arab tribes, the Muslim Brotherhood, Kurds, Alawites, Turkmen, Druzes, Christians, Assyrians, Yezidis, intellectuals (academician, artist, scientist), nongovernmental organizations, the representatives of prominent provinces, leaders of the Damascus Declaration, Syrian exiles from Europe, the United States, the Middle East, and Turkey.

The conference was the first one to be attended by reporters from all major global news outlets, including BBC, CNN, France 24, Al Jazeera, Al Arabiya, Alhurra, the Associated Press, Reuters, AFP, The New York Times, The Wall Street Journal and numerous Turkish and European media outlets.

== Results ==
=== Final Declaration ===
The conference concluded with a Final Declaration that displayed a change of tone regarding the Syrian government. Calling on president Bashar al-Assad to step down and to resign immediately from all of his duties and positions, this was the first time since the beginning of the uprising that the opposition dropped its calls for reform.

The final declaration consisted of the following seven demands:

# Participants are committed to the demands of the Syrian people in calling on the Syrian president to step down, in demanding the toppling of the regime, and in supporting the great, peaceful revolution of the Syrian people towards freedom and dignity."

1. Participants call on president Bashar al-Assad to resign immediately from all of his duties and positions and to hand over authority to his vice-president in accordance with constitutional procedures until the election of a transitional council which will draft and implement a new Syrian constitution that shall call for free and transparent parliamentary and presidential elections within a period not to exceed one year from the resignation of president Bashar al-Assad.
2. Participants assert their continuous support of the Syrian revolution until it achieves its objectives while emphasizing peace, patriotism, the unity of Syrian soil, the unequivocal rejection of foreign military intervention and national unity of Syrian revolution – one that does not represent any partisan direction nor does it target any particular group of Syrian society.
3. Participants affirm that the Syrian people are of many ethnicities, Arab, Kurd, Chaldean, Assyrian, Syriac, Turkmen, Chechen, Armenian and others. The conference establishes the legitimate and equal rights of all under a new Syrian constitution based on national unity, civil state and a pluralistic, parliamentary, and democratic regime.
4. Participants commit to exert all efforts towards achieving a democratic future of Syria which respects human rights and protects freedom for all Syrians, including the freedom of belief, expression and practice of religion, under a civil state based on the separation of legislative, judicial and executive powers, while adopting democracy and the ballot box as the sole medium of governance.
5. Participants are committed to the hard and serious missions of ensuring economic prosperity, scientific and cultural advancements under the umbrella of justice, peace and security.
6. Participants call on all Arabs, the Organization of Islamic Conference, the Arab League and the International Community to take legal and ethical responsibility in order to stop the violation of human rights and crimes against humanity committed against unarmed civilians, and to support the ambition of the Syrian people of freedom and democracy.

=== Elected councils ===
Consultative Council

The participants elected a follow-up Consultative Council of 31 members to coordinate all further activities supportive of the envisioned Syrian revolution. The slate-based list included 4 Kurds, 4 members of Arab tribes, 4 members of the Muslim Brotherhood, 4 supporters of the Damascus Declaration, plus 10 under 30 years-old independents and 5 over-30 years old independents and received over 200 out of some 250 votes.

The elected members were as following:

1. Hussain Abdelhadi
2. Tamer al-Awam
3. Amr al-Azm
4. Amir al-Dandal
5. Mulham al-Droubi
6. Moatasim Ibrahim al-Hariri
7. Ahmad Fahed Ibrahim al-Hodeideen
8. Muhammad Murad al-Khaznawi
9. Nour al-Masri
10. Ghassan al-Mifleh
11. Omar al-Muqdad
12. Salim Abdulaziz al-Muslet
13. Moaz al-Sibaai
14. Mosab Salih al-Tahhan
15. Radwan Badini
16. Najib Ghadbian
17. Ahmad Riyad Ghannam
18. Abdurrhaman Jleilati
19. Muhammad Karkouti
20. Mohammad Mansour
21. Salim Monem
22. Wajdi Moustafa
23. Hamdi Othman
24. Ammar al-Qurabi
25. Muhammad Rasheed
26. Muhammad Sadik Sheikh Deeb
27. Sondos Sulaiman
28. Walid Sheikho
29. Khawla Yusuf
30. Radwan Ziadeh
31. Aksam Barakat

Executive Council

Additionally an Executive Council was elected with the following nine members:

1. Amr al-Azm
2. Mulham al-Droubi
3. Ahed al-Hindi
4. Radwan Badini
5. Muhammad Karkouti
6. Abdel Ilah Milhem
7. Ammar al-Qurabi
8. Sondos Sulaiman
9. Khawla Yusuf

== Reactions and scholarly opinions ==
Burhan Ghalioun, first chairman of the later Syrian National Council, criticized the event as "serving foreign agendas," which prompted one of the organizers, Abdulrazak Eid, to accuse Ghalioun of attempting to appease the regime.

According to Swedish MENA-expert Aron Lund, the Muslim Brotherhood played "a central role" in the conference, while Kurds were "poorly represented". Paris-based political economist and publicist Samir Aita considered the Antalya conference as the turning point from an uprising for "freedom and dignity" towards a full-scale revolution. While all other opposition groups were looking to create the National Coordination Committee for Democratic Change (NCB), Aita sees in the conference a first attempt of the Muslim Brotherhood and the Syrian Democratic People's Party, main component of the Damascus Declaration body, to head out on a different path.

== Aftermath ==
The conference was succeeded by a Muslim Brotherhood-organized follow-up meeting two days later in Brussels, and another one in Paris that was addressed by Bernard Henri Levy It however took a number of further meetings in Istanbul and Doha, before at yet another meeting on 23 August in Istanbul created a permanent transitional council in form of the Syrian National Council.
