= Abd al-Malik Muhammad Yusuf Uthman Abd al Salam =

Al Qaeda financier

Abd al-Malik Muhammad Yusuf Uthman Abd Al Salam (also known as Umar al-Qatari and Umar Al-Tayyer; Arabic: عبد المالك محمد يوسف عثمان عبد السلام) is a jihadist of Palestinian Jordanian origin, who also holds a Qatari national ID. He is a U.S. and UN designated terrorist due to his financial, material, and technological support of Al-Qaeda and the Al Nusra Front.

== Background ==
Abd Al Salam was born on July 13, 1989. He is the son of Abu Abdul 'Aziz al-Qatari.

Abu Abdul 'Aziz al-Qatari is a senior-ranking al Qaeda militant and founder of the Syrian Islamist militant group Jund al Aqsa. He has appeared on numerous sanctions lists all over the world for his role in terrorism and terrorism financing.

Abd has been tied to Muhsin al Fadhli, a key leader of the al Qa'eda linked Khorsan group in Syria. He has also been responsible for facilitating donor funding with Iran-based al Qaeda leaders by delivering receipts that confirmed that al Qaeda received foreign donor funding. In 2011, he delivered thousands of dollars to al Fadhli in Iran.

In 2011, he participated in an attack against U.S. forces in Afghanistan. In 2012, he traveled throughout the Gulf, the Levant, Iran, and Southeast Asia as he recruited members and provided logistical support for al Qaeda. He also attended an al Qaeda training camp in 2012, located in Wazirstan that directly linked him to providing operational support for al Qaeda.

He has also aided the group in recruiting and organizing the travel of jihadists, especially Syrians based in Turkey, to fight alongside Al Nusra Front, al Qaeda’s Syrian offshoot. Additionally, he was involved in terror financing by raising funds for al Qaeda over the internet and transferring tens of thousands of euros to senior al Qaeda leaders with the help of Khalifa Muhammed Turki al Subai. He has worked with notable extremists in Lebanon, including Ibrahim al Bakr, by acquiring and transporting weaponry to Syria.

In May 2012, he was arrested in Beirut while attempting to go to Qatar conveying thousands of dollars to send to al Qaeda. He reportedly wired $4 million to his father from a Jordanian bank account before his arrest, claiming to work in his father’s Porsche business in Qatar. Despite his arrest, he maintained communication and connected detainees in Lebanon to extremist fighters in Syria and Lebanon. Al Nusra attempted to organize his release from prison in 2013 by brokering an exchange with al Qaeda’s Lebanese hostages. He was later freed from Lebanese prison, and deported to Jordan in February 2016, where he was held for months by Jordanian intelligence. He was eventually released and his passport taken.
