= Ibrahim Issa al-Bakr =

Qatari terrorist

Ibrahim Issa Hajji Muhammad al-Bakr (Arabic: إبراهيم عيسى حجي محمد البكر ) is a Qatari Specially Designated Global Terrorist (SDGT) according to the U.S. Department of the Treasury. Al-Bakr also has a history of supporting al-Qaeda and the Taliban through the collection and transfer of funds. Al-Bakr’s fundraising efforts for extremist groups and associations with al-Qaeda operatives and facilitators have led the United Nations and U.S. Department of the Treasury to list al-Bakr as a facilitator of terrorism. Ibrahim al-Bakr’s current location is unknown.

== Family ==
Ibrahim Issa Haji Muhammad al-Bakr, or Ibrahim Issa al-Bakr, was born on July 12, 1977, in Qatar.

Ibrahim Issa al-Bakr is one of five sons of Issa Haji Mohammed al-Bakr. One of Ibrahim’s brothers, Mohammad Isa al-Bakr, was a coordinator of the now defunct Madid Ahl al-Sham online fundraising campaign that was cited by members of the Al-Nusra Front as "one of the preferred conduits for donations" and garnered widespread support from terrorist financiers.

Ibrahim’s father, Issa Haji Mohammed al-Bakr, died in November 2011 at 90 years old.

== Terrorist activity and Qatar's mismanagement ==
Al-Bakr was arrested in the early 2000s by Qatari authorities for his involvement in a jihadist network and for working as a fundraiser to support terrorism. Al-Bakr was later released from prison after "he promised not to conduct terrorist activity in Qatar."

In 2002, al-Bakr provided a fraudulent passport to a senior al-Qaida operative. The identity of the al-Qaeda operative has not been specifically indicated. However, the U.S. Department of the Treasury reported that SDGT Abd Muhammad al-Kawari obtained a fraudulent passport for Hassan Ghul in the early 2000s before traveling to Qatar with Ibrahim al-Bakr. Hassan Ghul, a senior al-Qaida operative, has been labeled as Osama bin Laden’s emissary to Abu Musab al-Zarqawi. Also in 2002, Al-Bakr received tens of thousands of dollars from an al-Qaeda operative in Saudi Arabia and couriered it to a Pakistan-based facilitator. In 2006, Al-Bakr reportedly played a decisive role in a plan to attack U.S. troops in Qatar. According to documents produced by Alkarama, an international NGO with controversial ties to extremism based in Switzerland, he was briefly jailed again in 2006 but was eventually released without trial during the same year.

In a 2014 report from the U.S. Department of Treasury entitled "Treasury Designates Twelve Foreign Terrorist Fighter Facilitators", al-Bakr was described as having "played a key role in a terrorist cell that was plotting to attack U.S. military bases and personnel in Qatar." Al-Bakr’s involvement in the terrorist network began as of early 2006.

As of mid-2012, al-Bakr had also worked for al-Qaeda by collecting and transferring funds from Gulf-based financiers to al-Qaeda and the Taliban.

In a 2014 article, The Telegraph claims that al-Bakr "has connections" to Abd al-Malik Muhammad Yusuf Uthman abd al-Salam who was added to the U.N. Security Council’s Al-Qaida Sanctions List in 2015. Al-Salam, widely known as Umar al-Qatari, is a Qatar-based Jordanian national designated as a SDGT for giving "thousands of dollars and material support to a Syria-based al-Qaida associate intended for ANF (Al-Nusra Front) operatives", recruiting for ANF, facilitating travel to ANF in Syria, and working alongside Ibrahim al-Bakr to acquire and transport weapons to Syria with the help of a Syria-based al-Qaeda operative.

Lebanese paper al-Mustaqbal reported that Abd al-Malik mediated a $50,000 delivery from Ibrahim al-Bakr to Muhsin al-Fadhli, an al-Qaeda operative. According to the same source, al-Malik initially acknowledged his role in the exchange, although he eventually denied that he had facilitated the delivery.

As Foundation for Defense of Democracies Senior Fellow David Weinberg recorded in his report titled “Qatar and Terror Finance. Part II: Private Funders of al-Qaeda in Syria”, Bakr also provided currency for al-Nusra fighters and their families to Abd al-Malik as he was travelling to Lebanon from Syria. Specifically, al-Malik reportedly admitted that he had received “roughly 15,000 euros, 5,000 Qatari riyals, and Syrian, American, and Malaysian currency”, a version that he later retracted.

In late 2012, Ibrahim al-Bakr traveled to Waziristan, Federally Administered Tribal Areas, Pakistan "for his work with al-Qaida." Because Umar al-Qatari also traveled to Waziristan in 2012, where he spent time at an al-Qaida training camp, some questions remain about whether their connection extended beyond their work for al Nusra Front and into supporting al-Qaeda training sites.

In March 2013, Lebanese newspaper al-Joumhouriya claimed that in 2012 Bakr had met in Beirut with both Abd al-Malik and Shadi al-Mawlawi, which Lebanese authorities prosecuted and convicted as a terror financier on behalf of al-Nusra. On that occasion, al-Bakr allegedly provided Mawlawi with funds to purchase weapons for Nusra fighters in Syria. Furthermore, al-Bakr reportedly encouraged Mawlawi to facilitate deliveries of ammunitions and funds into Syria.

As of late 2014, it was reported that the U.S. believes al-Bakr is "still providing financial, material, or technological support to al-Qaeda."

In spite of his long track record as a terror financier, it appears that Qatar has never properly prosecuted Al-Bakr or pressed charged against him. Currently, no record exists that charges were pressed in absentia.

== Terrorist designation ==
On September 24, 2014, the U.S. Department of the Treasury named Ibrahim ‘Isa Hajji Muhammad al-Bakr as a SDGT and a foreign terrorist fighter facilitator. On January 23, 2015, the United Nations Security Council’s ISIL & Al-Qaida Sanctions Committee listed al-Bakr as being associated with al-Qaeda for "participating in the financing, planning, facilitating, preparing, or perpetrating of acts or activities by, in conjugation with, under the name of, on behalf of, or in support of" and "otherwise supporting acts or activities of" al-Qaeda.
