= Khalid Saeed al-Bounein =

Qatari real estate investor

Khalid Saeed al-Bounein (Arabic: البوعينين خالد سعيد) is a Qatari real estate investor and charity coordinator and fundraiser in eastern Qatar. Al-Bounein worked for the defunct Madid Ahl al-Sham online fundraising campaign which has been cited as a conduit for financing the al-Nusra Front.

== Charity efforts ==
=== Qatar Charity ===
In early 2016, Al-Bounein volunteered with a Qatar Charity delegation to deliver relief materials to Syrian refugees in Iraq. The delegation delivered winter relief items to refugees in the Iraqi Kurdistan cities of Erbil, Sulaymaniyah, and Dohuk.

=== Madid Ahl al-Sham ===
In 2013, al-Bounein was mentioned as a point of contact in a Madid Ahl al-Sham call to donations. Al-Bounein's contact information is listed for residents of Doha that are interested in contributing to Madid Ahl al-Sham. Later calls for donations cite al-Bounein as the point of contact for residents of al-Rayyan, Nasiriyah, and al-Aziziya to donate to Madid Ahl al-Sham.

Madid Ahl al-Sham is a defunct online fundraising that was suspected of financing terrorist organizations. In 2012, the Washington Post reported that Jabhat al-Nusra cited the campaign “as one of the preferred conduits for donations intended for the group, which has pledged loyalty to al-Qaeda leader Ayman al-Zawahiri.” In 2014, the U.S. Department of State described Madid Ahl al-Sham as an “online fundraising campaign that was suspected of sending funds to violent extremist elements in Syria.”

In Madid Ahl al-Sham's calls to donations, Al-Bounein's name is listed alongside Saad al-Kabi and Muhammad Isa al-Bakr as a point of contact for the Madid Ahl al-Sham campaign. Al-Kabi is a U.S. Department of the Treasury Specially Designated Global Terrorist (SDGT) for setting “up donation campaigns in Qatar to aid with fundraising in response to a request from an ANF associate for money to purchase both weapons and food.” According to the Department of Treasury, al-Kabi also acted as an intermediary for ANF and worked closely with ANF fundraiser Hamid bin Abdallah al-Ali.

== Arrest ==
In 2004, the Arab Commission for Human Rights released a report on arbitrary detention in Qatar. The report emphasized the organization's concern that Qatari authorities were not adhering to the law by making arbitrary arrests and holding the suspects without a trial. At the end of the report, al-Bounein is listed as one of ten detainees, many of which were also associated with Madid Ahl al-Sham, extremist elements, or are designated global terrorists.

== Controversy ==
Khalid Saeed al-Bounein follows several controversial accounts on his personal Twitter account. In addition to following SDGT Umayr al-Nuaymi, al-Bounein also follows many accounts linked to the Salafist group active in Syria, Ahrar al-Sham. Al-Bounein also uses his Twitter account to promote quotes from Ibn Taymiyyah and Ibn Qayyim al-Jawziyya, among others. Ibn Taymiyyah and al-Jawziyya were Islamic theologians commonly referenced by Salafists for their ideas promoting Wahhabism, Salafism, and Jihadism.
