= Omar al-Muqdad =

Syrian journalist

Omar al-Muqdad (born in Bosra, Daraa) is a Syrian journalist, who since 2012 lives in the United States.

== Biography ==
After graduation from high school, Omar enrolled at the College of Political Science, Damascus University, and eventually majored in International Relations.

As a participant in the Antalya Conference for Change in Syria, al-Muqdad was elected into the conference's Consultative Council. Following the conference, al-Muqdad stayed in Turkey and worked as a freelance journalist with CNN's Istanbul office.

In Turkey, Omar lived for a year as a refugee where he was assisting international media covering the Syrian Revolution 2011. Al-Muqdad continued to find ways to sneak back into Syria so he could help news organizations report on atrocities in there. One of the most important reports he contributed to with CNN was about the anti-personnel mines planted by the Syrian government near Turkish border to prevent refugees from escaping their houses shelled by Assad forces, as systematic massacres executed by Assad militia forced thousands from their homes seeking refuge in Turkey.

He was featured in BBC's Panorama: Syria Inside the Secret Revolution on 26 September 2011.

In June 2012, al-Muqdad was granted asylum into the United States.
