= Law–Citizenship–Rights Movement =

Law–Citizenship–Rights Movement حركة قيم–مواطنة–حقوق
- Leader: Haytham Manna
- Founded: March 1, 2015
- Headquarters: Qamishli
- Ideology: Secularism; Nonsectarianism
- Political position: Centre
- Slogan: Citizenship, rights, values
- Democratic Council: 3 / 43

The Law–Citizenship–Rights Movement (Arabic: قيم مواطنة حقوق), abbreviated QMH (from the English transliteration qiyyam, muwatana, huqouq), also known as Teyar El-Qemih (from the Arabic acronym), and translated as Wheat Wave Movement, is a democratic secular multi-ethnic political party established in 2015 in northern Syria.

== Elected representatives ==
The Law–Citizenship–Rights Movement currently has three members on the General Federal Assembly of the Syrian Democratic Council (SDC), Salih El-Nebwanî, Majid Hebu (also written Macid Hebo) and Haytham Manna who was a co-leader of the assembly. Manna resigned his leadership role from the SDC on 19 March 2016 in protest at the council's announcement of a federal system for Northern Syria, i.e. at the creation of Rojava.
