= Interpol notice =

International alert/announcement

Emblems of Interpol notices

An Interpol notice is an international alert circulated by Interpol to communicate information about crimes, criminals, and threats by police in a member state (or an authorised international entity) to their counterparts around the world. The information disseminated via notices concerns individuals wanted for serious crimes, missing persons, unidentified bodies, possible threats, prison escapes, and criminals' modus operandi.

There are eight types of notices, seven of which are colour-coded by their function: red, blue, green, yellow, black, orange, and purple. The best-known notice is the red notice, which is the "closest instrument to an international arrest warrant in use today". An eighth special notice is issued at the request of the United Nations Security Council.

Notices published by Interpol are made either on the organisation's own initiative or are based on requests from national central bureaus (NCBs) of member states or authorised international entities such as the United Nations and the International Criminal Court. All notices are published on Interpol's secure website. Extracts of notices may also be published on Interpol's public website if the requesting entity agrees.

Interpol may only publish a notice that adheres to all the proper legal conditions. For example, a notice will not be published if it violates Interpol's constitution, which forbids the organisation from undertaking activities of a political, military, religious, or racial character. Interpol may refuse to publish a notice that it considers inadvisable or a potential risk.

Notices may be issued in any of the four official languages of Interpol: English, French, Spanish, and Arabic.

== Notice types ==
Types of Interpol notices
Notice type	Details
Red Notice	To seek the location/arrest of a person wanted by a judicial jurisdiction or international tribunal with a view to extradition
Blue Notice	To locate, identify or obtain information on a person of interest in a criminal investigation
Green Notice	To warn about a person's criminal activities if that person is considered to be a possible threat to public safety
Yellow Notice	To locate a missing person or to identify a person unable to identify themselves
Black Notice	To seek information on unidentified bodies
Orange Notice	To warn of an event, a person, an object or a process representing an imminent threat and danger to persons or property
Purple Notice	To provide information on modus operandi, procedures, objects, devices, or hiding places used by criminals
Silver Notice	To identify and trace criminal assets. (Currently in its pilot phase)
Interpol–United Nations Security Council Special Notice	To inform Interpol's members that an individual or an entity is subject to UN sanctions

In 2025, Interpol began piloting a Silver Notice for assets used in criminal activities. Similar to the notice is another request for cooperation or alert mechanism known as a "diffusion". This is less formal than a notice, but also is used to request the arrest or location of an individual or additional information in relation to a police investigation. A diffusion is circulated directly by a member state or international entity to the countries of their choice, or to the entire Interpol membership and is simultaneously recorded in Interpol's databases.

== History ==
The International notice system was created in 1946 as Interpol re-established itself after World War II in the Parisian suburb of Saint-Cloud. It initially consisted of six colour-coded notices: Red, Blue, Green, Yellow, Black, and Purple. In 2004, the seventh colour was added, Orange.

In 2005, the Interpol-United Nations Security Council special notice was created at the request of the UN Security Council through Resolution 1617 to provide better tools to help the Security Council carry out its mandate regarding the freezing of assets, travel bans, and arms embargoes aimed at individuals and entities associated with Al-Qaeda and the Taliban and was adopted by Interpol at its 74th General Assembly in Berlin in September 2005.

Interpol notices issued since 2011
Year	Published										In circulation (EOY)		Arrests
Year	Red	Blue	Green	Yellow	Black	Orange	Purple	Interpol‑UN	Diffusions	Total	Notes	Diffusions	Arrests
2011	7,678	705	1,132	1,059	104	31	8	30	15,708	±26,500	40,836	48,310	7,958
2012	8,136	1,085	1,477	1,691	141	31	16	78	20,130	±32,750	46,994	66,614	
2013	8,857	1,691	1,004	1,889	117	43	102	79	21,183	±34,820	52,880	70,159	1,749
2014	10,718	2,355	1,216	2,814	153	29	75	72	21,922	±39,250	60,187	74,625	2,336
2015	11,492	3,913	1,248	2,505	153	36	139	51	22,753	±42,266	67,491	78,313	
2016	12,878	4,060	901	2,675	121	56	115	37					
2017	12,042	2,508	4,422	130	777	3	165	19					
2018	13,516	2,397	4,139	134	827	52	97	28					
2019	13,410	3,193	3,375	256	761	33	92	15					
2020	11,094	2,554	3,966	391	509	39	130	9					
2021	10,776	2,622	3,604	118	1,072	45	107	13					
2022	11,282	2,916	4,073	167	607	43	101	6					
2023	12,260	2,687	3,546	282	473	17	72	10					
2024	15,548	3,345	4,078	211	561	43	68	23					

== Controversy ==
=== Red Notice controversies ===
In his book Red Notice: A True Story of High Finance, Murder, and One Man's Fight for Justice, Bill Browder, the CEO of Hermitage Capital Management, describes how the Russian government repeatedly requested that Interpol issue a Red Notice for his arrest. Interpol refused to do so on the basis that it deemed the request was "predominantly political in nature and therefore contrary to INTERPOL's rules and regulations". With Russia unable to secure his extradition, Browder was subsequently tried and convicted by a Moscow court for tax evasion in absentia.

In January 2017, United Kingdom-based NGO Fair Trials called on Interpol to introduce more rigorous checks. Fair Trials chief executive Jago Russell stated, "Interpol has been allowing itself to be used by oppressive regimes across the world to export the persecution of human rights defenders, journalists and political opponents". There have been concerns about conflict of interest as well as in March 2017, the UAE donated $54 million to Interpol, which roughly equalled the contributions by all other member states. Interpol's secretary-general, Jurgen Stock, stated that Interpol had introduced a task force to review requests "even more intensively".

In June 2020, Iran issued an arrest warrant for US President Donald Trump and 35 other US political and military officials for their role in the assassination of Qasem Soleimani and asked Interpol to issue a Red Notice. The request was rejected on the basis that this was essentially a political matter. Iran renewed the request in January 2021 after Trump left office, but it was again rejected.

It was shown in 2013 that Interpol Red Notices were sometimes inaccurate and could be politically motivated. NGOs such as Fair Trials International have pointed to its limited internal controls to tackle political abuses. Many of its members have poor human rights records and corrupt, undemocratic governments and have been accused of abusing the Red Notice networks for political purposes.

Some Red Notices are controversial and have been used to persecute opponents of regimes, for example the former president of Ukraine, Viktor Yanukovych, whose Red Notice for embezzlement, misappropriation or conversion of property was removed after it was claimed to be a political request.

Interpol issued a new refugee policy in 2015, stipulating that a Red Notice should not be issued against a refugee when it has been requested by the country from which the refugee initially fled.

In November 2018, Bahrain issued a Red Notice for footballer and dissident Hakeem al-Araibi, who had fled Bahrain in 2014 and been granted refugee status in Australia some years later. He was arrested on arrival in Thailand with his wife for a honeymoon in November 2018 by Thai police on the basis of the Red Notice, despite the Red Notice being withdrawn a few days later on the basis of illegality. On 11 February, he was released after Thai prosecutors dropped the case, arriving in Australia the following day. He was granted Australian citizenship one month later, on 12 March 2019.

There has been growing concern about refugees being targeted by Red Notices illegally. Recent examples before al-Araibi's case include the detention of Russian activist Petr Silaev in Spain and Algerian human rights lawyer Rachid Mesli in Italy. In al-Araibi's case, despite the Red Notice being withdrawn only a few days after being issued, Bahrain nonetheless issued an extradition order, and Thailand complied, leading to a trial in which al-Araibi had to defend his opposition to the extradition.

== Commission for the Control of Interpol's Files ==
The Commission for the Control of Interpol's Files (CCF) is an independent monitoring body. It operates in line with a number of official rules and documents and has three main functions:

- Monitoring the application of data protection rules to personal data processed by Interpol
- Advising with regard to any operations or projects concerning the processing of personal information
- Processing requests for access to Interpol's files

In 2008, the Interpol General Assembly voted to amend Interpol's constitution to integrate the CCF into its internal legal structure, thereby guaranteeing its independence.

The CCF's most notable function, however, is to consider legal petitions submitted by individuals requesting the revocation of red notices. Such petitions, as a rule, only succeed when a red notice is deemed to infringe on Interpol's Constitution either because it offends the Universal Declaration of Human Rights or because it was issued for political, religious, military, or racial reasons.
