= Rachad =

- Formation: 2007
- Website: https://rachad.org/

Rachad (Arabic: رشاد) is an Algerian Islamist political movement. Rachad claims its goal is to "bring about a fundamental change in Algeria, to break with the political practices in progress since independence and to restore hope to the Algerian people" and that it "intends to work for the establishment of a rule of law governed by democratic principles and good governance." It calls upon the Algerian people to overthrow the government by peaceful mass protests, arguing that the government is controlled by a military junta largely responsible for the horrors of the Algerian Civil War and for the country's economic and social malaise. The movement has the reputation for having a high "intellectual calibre of the leadership" and for transcending the gulf between secular and Islamist politics. According to Rachad, any Algerian can join Rachad, "respecting their differences, banishes all forms of extremism, exclusion or discrimination and advocates non-violence to bring about change".

As of 2021 it is banned by the Algerian government.

== History ==
Rachad was founded in 2007 by a number of Algerian opponents of the current government, including Abbas Aroua, Mourad Dhina, Rachid Mesli, Mohamed Samraoui, and Mohamed Larbi Zitout (who comprise the movement's secretariat, and all live in exile), and others living in Algeria whose identity has not been made public. In September 2008, its founding member Abbas Aroua, through the Cordoba Foundation, organised a conference in Geneva, "Perspectives on political change in Algeria", which brought together Algerians from a variety of political perspectives who oppose the current system, including Rachad, to agree on a set of shared principles. Along with other groups across the political spectrum, it called for a boycott of the 2009 presidential elections; afterwards, it condemned the reported results as fraudulent and claimed that the true participation rate was just 16%. The organisation has made extensive use of TV and the Internet to spread its ideas, with spokespersons appearing on major channels including Aljazeera. In January 2011, as unprecedented large-scale protests began in Algeria, it called upon its supporters to join demonstrations against the system. Rachad's pronouncements have been supportive of the Arab Spring uprisings, including the overthrow of Muammar Gaddafi in Libya, while condemning the Algerian political reforms undertaken by the Bouteflika régime as a "masquerade".
