= Muhsin al-Fadhli =

Kuwaiti al-Qaeda member (1981–2015)

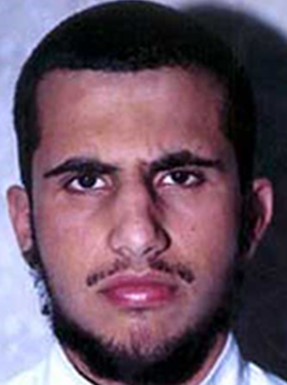
- al-Fadhli, U.S. State Department photo
- Born: 24 April 1981; Kuwait
- Died: 8 July 2015 (aged 34) Near Sarmada, Syria
- Allegiance: al-Qaeda
- Branch: al-Nusra Front: Khorasan
- Service years: Unknown–2015
- Rank: Leader of Khorasan's external operations
- Conflicts: War in Afghanistan; Syrian Civil War; Military intervention against ISIL: American-led intervention in Syria

Muhsin Fadhil Ayed Ashour al-Fadhli (Arabic: محسن فضيل عيد عاشور الفضلي) (24 April 1981 – 8 July 2015) was an alleged senior leader of Khorasan, an offshoot of the al-Nusra Front, a branch of al-Qaeda.

== Militant activity ==
According to the U.S. Department of Treasury, al-Fadhli fought alongside the Taliban and al-Qaeda in Afghanistan as the second-in-command to an unnamed al-Qaeda leader. In Chechnya, Al-Fadhli fought against Russian forces and received military training. According to media reports, al-Fadhli was a close confidant of Osama bin Laden, and one of a few people to be informed of the September 11 attacks, before they were launched. He was born in Kuwait and used the aliases Abu Majid Samiyah, Abu Samia, Dawud al-Asadi, Muhsin Fadhil Ayyid al-Fadhli and Muhsin Fadil Ayid Ashur al-Fadhli.

By 2002, al-Fadhli was raising funds for the attack on the French Maritime Jewel ship that was carried out later that year off the coast of Yemen. Al-Fadhli was also suspected of being connected to the October 2002 attack on U.S. Marines on the Kuwaiti island of Faylaka. In February 2003, al-Fadhli was convicted by a Kuwaiti court for financial support for terrorist activities and participating in military training in Afghanistan in order to carry out terrorist attacks. The Kuwaiti court issued a five-year jail sentence to al-Fadhi and the other three convicted terrorists.

In the U.S. Department of Treasury's 2005 designation of al-Fadhli, he is mentioned as “a major facilitator connected to the brutal terrorist, Abu Musab al-Zarqawi” who assisted fighters attacking U.S. and multinational forces in Iraq. The Saudi Ministry of Interior listed al-Fadhli as a suspected terrorist in 2005 and the United Nations added al-Fadhli to its Al-Qaida Sanctions List in 2011.

In 2012, the United States State Department identified al-Fadhli as the leader of al-Qaeda in Iran and issued a $7 million reward for his capture. According to the Treasury's announcement, al-Fadhli started working with al-Qaeda in Iran in 2009. Al-Fadhli was subsequently arrested by Iranian authorities, but was released in 2011 after which he replaced Yasin al-Suri as the leader of al-Qaeda's Iran-based facilitation network. The Iran-based al-Qaeda web worked to finance terrorist activities in Afghanistan and Pakistan and transport its fighters to al-Qaeda's affiliates in Syria through Turkey. According to the U.S. Treasury, al-Fadhli used his network of wealthy Kuwaiti terrorist donors to send money to jihadists fighting in Syria. Al-Fadhli also received “thousands of dollars” from Abd al-Malik Muhammad Yusuf Uthman Abd al Salam, a Qatari ID holder and designated al-Qaeda and Al-Nusra Front facilitator.

In mid-2013, al-Fadhli was sent to Syria on behalf of al-Qaeda emir, Ayman al-Zawahiri, in order to mediate disputes between al-Qaeda's then Iraqi branch, the Islamic State of Iraq (ISI) and the al-Nusra Front. Following the total collapse of relations in February 2014, al-Fadhli was instrumental in influencing al-Qaeda's leadership to completely disassociate itself from the Islamic State of Iraq and the Levant.

== Death ==
Al-Fadhli was killed on 8 July 2015, when the United States Air Force carried out an airstrike, targeting a vehicle carrying several al-Qaeda members near the al-Nusra-controlled town of Sarmada in northwest Syria, according to the Pentagon.
