= Mohamed Larbi Zitout =

Algerian activist (born 1963)

Mohamed Larbi Zitout (Arabic: محمد العربي زيتوت), is an Algerian political commentator, born on 29 July 1963 in Laghouat, Algeria.

== Biography ==
After graduating from the Ecole Nationale d'Administration (Algérie) in Algiers and obtaining a master's degree in International Relations, he pursued a career in diplomacy. By 1995, he was a diplomat in Libya. In 1995, however - three years into the Algerian Civil War - he resigned from his position and emigrated to the United Kingdom

He has been interviewed or appeared commentator in a number of newspapers and broadcast media, such as the BBC, ABC and Al-Jazeera, and has contributed chapters to An Inquiry into the Algerian Massacres ("Les Régimes Arabes et le Conflit Algérien", p. 847) and Quelle réconciliation pour l'Algérie? ("La reconciliation passe par réhabilitation des victimes, de la nation et de l'Etat", p. 121.) He is a founding member of Justitia Universalis, a human rights organisation set up in 2001 dedicated to fighting impunity.

He was also listed to be considered as a terrorist, including the party that he helped form (Rachad) since 27 February 2022 by the Algerian Government.
