= Abdullah Sallum Abdullah =

Syrian politician

His Excellency Abdullah Sallum Abdullah
- عبد الله سلوم عبد الله

Minister of State for People's Assembly Affairs
- In office 10 August 2021 – 29 March 2023
- President: Bashar al-Assad
- Prime Minister: Hussein Arnous
- Preceded by: Himself
- Succeeded by: Ahmed Mohammad Bustaji
- In office 3 July 2016 – 30 August 2020
- President: Bashar al-Assad
- Prime Minister: Imad Khamis; Hussein Arnous
- Succeeded by: Himself

Personal details
- Born: 1955 (age 70–71) Azaz, Aleppo Governorate, Second Syrian Republic
- Party: Socialist Unionists
- Children: 2
- Education: Damascus University
- Profession: Politician, Lawyer

Abdullah Sallum Abdullah (Arabic: عبد الله سلوم عبد الله; born 1956) is a Syrian politician, former state minister for People's Assembly Affairs, former MP and Socialist Unionist Party presidential candidate at the 2021 Syrian presidential election. He studied law at Damascus University.
