= Haytham Manna =

Syrian academic and politician (born 1951)

President of the Law–Citizenship–Rights Movement
- Incumbent
- Assumed office 1 March 2015
- Preceded by: Party established

Personal details
- Born: Haitham Youssef Nasser Al-Awdat; 16 May 1951 (age 75) Daraa, Daraa Governorate, Syria
- Party: QMH (since 2015)
- Other political affiliations: NCC
- Education: Pierre and Marie Curie University (MBBS); Sorbonne Paris North University (PhD)
- Occupation: Physician; anthropologist; politician; activist; writer

Haitham Youssef Nasser Al-Awdat (Arabic: هيثم يوسف ناصر العودات; born 16 May 1951) is a Syrian physician, anthropologist, writer, human rights activist, and politician. He has served as president of the Law–Citizenship–Rights Movement since 2015. Manna is a long-time advocate for human rights and democratic reform in Syria; during the Syrian civil war, he played a prominent role in several Syrian opposition movements.

Manna studied medicine at Damascus University before continuing his medical education at Pierre and Marie Curie University in Paris. He later pursued social sciences at the School for Advanced Studies in the Social Sciences under the supervision of anthropologists Marc Augé, Maurice Godelier, and Françoise Héritier. He earned a doctorate in anthropology from Sorbonne Paris North University (formerly Paris 13 University), specializing in psychosomatic therapy, and also completed postgraduate studies in sleep and wakefulness disorders at the University of Montpellier.

Alongside his academic career, Manna became active as a writer and journalist. He contributed to several Arabic-language periodicals, including "Arab Studies'', edited the bulletin ''Revolutionaries'', and published medical and political journals during his years at the University of Damascus.

For more than three decades, Manna was active in the international human rights movement. He helped found the Arab Commission for Human Rights (ACHR) and served as its spokesperson. Following the outbreak of the Syrian civil war in 2011, he resigned from the commission to help establish the National Coordination Committee for Democratic Change (NCC), a domestic Syrian opposition coalition advocating democratic reform through political dialogue and opposing both the government of Bashar al-Assad and armed Islamist groups. Manna served as the NCC's principal spokesperson.

In 2015, Manna founded the Law–Citizenship–Rights Movement (QMH), a secular political movement promoting democracy, citizenship, and human rights. That same year, he was elected co-chair of the newly established Syrian Democratic Council, the political wing associated with the Syrian Democratic Forces. On 19 March 2016, Manna resigned as co-chair of the council after it endorsed the establishment of a federal system in northern Syria, later known as the Autonomous Administration of North and East Syria. He stated that his resignation reflected his opposition to federalism imposed without a nationwide political consensus.

Manna has lived in Paris for many years, where he has continued his academic, political, and human rights activities.

== Selected works ==
- Islam et heresies: L’obsession blasphematoire. Harmattan, 1997, ISBN 2-7384-5901-3.
- L’Algérie contemporaine – bilan et solutions pour sortir de la crise. Harmattan, 2000, ISBN 2-7384-8804-8.
- Human Rights in the Arab-Islamic Culture. Cairo Institute for Human Rights Studies, 1996.
- Citizenship in Arab-Islamic History, Cairo Institute for Human Rights Studies, 1997.
- "Es kann gelingen – demokratischer Wandel in Syrien" In: Wolfgang Gehrcke/Christiane Reymann (Hg.), Syrien. Wie man einen säkularen Staat zerstört und eine Gesellschaft islamisiert, PapyRossa Verlag 2013, ISBN 978-3-89-438-521-7.
- DAECH, L'Etat de la barbarie, Point de Repère, Paris; 2014 ISBN 978-2-35930-140-3
- Islam and Women's Rights, SIHR, Geneva 2015
- Les Parias de Damas, Les Points sur les I, Paris, 2016 ISBN 9782359302172
- Ocalanism, Ideological Construction and Practice, Scandinavian Institute for Human Rights, Geneva, 2017 ISBN 2-914595-85-9

• Short Universal Encyclopedia of Human Rights, 3 Volumes, 2018, Beirut, Bisan, 2018, ISBN 978-3899-11-240-5

- La Chute de l'Islam politique, Hachette-Antoine, 2021, ISBN 978-614-469-856-3
- Big sticks: The Lie Industry, The Philosophy of Defeat in Hybrid Wars (Russia/Ukraine), SIHR, Germany, 2022,

- Atlas of No Violence, • Atlas de la Non-Violence, Hachette-Antoine, 2023, ISBN 9786140601673
