= Arab Commission for Human Rights =

Arab Commission for Human Rights اللجنة العربية لحقوق الإنسان Commission Arabe des Droits Humains
- Founded: January 17, 1998
- Type: Non-profit; NGO
- Location: formally registered in Paris, 2/3 members live in Arab world, 1/3 in Europe
- Region served: Arab world
- Fields: human rights
- Members: 15 founders in 1998
- Key people: Violette Daguerre, Moncef Marzouki, Haytham Manna
- Website: www.achr.nu

The Arab Commission for Human Rights (Arabic: اللجنة العربية لحقوق الإنسان / French: Commission Arabe des Droits Humains / ACHR) is an Arab world non-governmental human rights organisation that was founded in 1998.

== Founding ==
The Arab Commission for Human Rights is a human rights non-governmental organisation founded on 17 January 1998 by 15 human rights activists from around the Arab world, that bases its work in the 1948 Universal Declaration of Human Rights (UDHR), the International Covenant on Economic, Social and Cultural Rights (ICESC), and the International Covenant on Civil and Political Rights (ICCPR). The ACHR claims to avoid any political affiliation. The ACHR aims to cover all human rights as being divisible in order to avoid the "western" vision of organisations of the "North" which limit their human rights advocacy to "arbitrary detention, judicial supervision, enforced disappearances, and torture."

== Leadership ==
The ACHR has a 15-member Board of Directors led by President Violette Daguerre from Lebanon. The Board includes Tunisian human rights activist and interim President of Tunisia Moncef Marzouki. Haytham Manna from Syria helped create the ACHR, becoming its spokesperson. He resigned from his role as ACHR spokesperson, while remaining a "non-office-holding" member, when in 2011 he helped found and take a leading role in the National Coordination Committee for Democratic Change in Syria.

== 2009 suspension from United Nations Economic and Social Council ==
In June 2008, Algerian human rights lawyer and activist Rachid Mesli spoke at a United Nations event in Geneva on behalf of the Arab Commission for Human Rights. Algeria complained that Mesli had been charged with terrorism in 1999, and on 26 January 2009, representatives from the United Kingdom, Egypt, Sudan, Qatar and Algeria, along with other states, voted 18 to 0 (plus 1 abstention) to suspend the ACHR from the United Nations Economic and Social Council (ECOSOC).
