= Salim al-Kuwari =

Qatari Al-Qaeda financier and facilitator

Salim Hasan Khalifa Rashid al-Kuwari (Arabic: سليم حسن خليفة راشد الكواري) (also: Salim Al-Kowari, Salem Al-Kuwari), born in 1978, is a Qatari national who is currently designated by the United States Government as an Al-Qaeda financier and facilitator. Despite his current designation and having been arrested by the Qatari government on two occasions, Kuwari continues to live freely in Qatar’s capital, Doha, although both the Qatari government and he refuse to comment.

== Career ==
According to a press release issued by United States Department of Treasury on July 7, 2011, Kuwari continues to lend "financial and logistical support to al-Qa’ida, primarily through al-Qa’ida facilitators in Iran" it went on to assert that the Qatari has "provided hundreds of thousands of dollars in financial support to al-Qa’ida and has provided funding for al-Qa’ida operations, as well as to secure the release of al-Qa’ida detainees in Iran and elsewhere. He has also facilitated travel for extremist recruits on behalf of senior al-Qa’ida facilitators based in Iran."

Evidence suggests that up until his first arrest in 2009, Kuwari was employed by Qatar’s Ministry of Interior, working in the “civil defense” sector. On 27 June, Kuwari, along with a man named Abdullah Khowar, was arrested by members of State Security, only to later be released and returned to his job working for the Interior Ministry.

== Arrests ==
On February 7, 2011, Kuwari was once again arrested by State Security forces, this time being taken to his home to be search before being detained, and later released. It is unclear if Kuwari is still employed by the Qatari government.

At the time of Kuwari’s arrest, detainment, and apparent re-instatement, the head of the Interior Ministry was Abdullah bin Khalid al-Thani. During his tenure as Minister of Religious Affairs, Al-Thani is accused in the official 9/11 Commission Report of sheltering Khaled Sheikh Mohamed, the mastermind of the 9/11 attacks.

Shortly following both arrests, the Alkarama Foundation released statements advocating for Kuwari. The Alkarama Foundation has been continuously criticized for its connections with Al-Qaeda, with its founding members designated as financiers of the terror group.
