= Democratic Arab Socialist Union =

Syrian political party based in France

Democratic Arab Socialist Union الاتحاد الاشتراكي العربي الديمقراطي
- Secretary-General: Ahmed al-Asrawi
- Assistant Secretary General: Mohammad Abdul Majeed Manjuneh
- Founder: Jamal al-Atassi
- Founded: 1980
- Split from: Arab Socialist Union Party of Syria
- Headquarters: Paris, France
- Ideology: Nasserism; Democratic socialism
- Political position: Centre-left to left-wing
- National affiliation: National Democratic Rally; National Coordination Committee for Democratic Change

Website
- Official website

The Democratic Arab Socialist Union (Arabic: الاتحاد الاشتراكي العربي الديمقراطي, Al-ittiḥād al-ishtirākī al-'arabī al-dīmūqrāṭī; French: Union arabe socialiste démocratique) (DASU) is a Nasserist democratic socialist Syrian political party based in Paris, France. It was founded in a split of the Arab Socialist Union Party of Syria. The party is the largest of the opposition parties, but has a 'soft' approach in its opposition. The DASU is part of the National Democratic Rally coalition (Arabic: التجمع الوطني الديمقراطي, Al-tajammuʻ al-waṭanī al-dīmūqrāṭī). The party is one of the largest in the coalition, and has a historic rivalry with other most major party in the group, the Syrian Democratic People's Party. This rivalry would cripple the front.

== Creation ==
After Hafez al-Assad took power in 1970, the ASU entered into negotiations about a coalition government, and agreed to join the National Progressive Front (NPF) in 1972. The year after, however, the party split over the adoption of a Syrian constitution in which the Ba'ath was proclaimed the "leading party" of the country. One minor faction under Fawzi Kiyali accepted the constitution, and retained both the ASU name and the NPF membership, while most members followed party leader Jamal al-Atassi into opposition, by renaming themselves the Democratic Arab Socialist Union (DASU). Hassan Ismail Abdelazim succeeded Jamal al-Atassi after his death in 2000.

== Syrian civil war ==
Abdelazim was arrested by the Syrian authorities in May 2011 as a crackdown on opposition forces in Syria, but he was quickly released. On June 30, 2011, DASU, along with other parties, established The National Coordination Bureau for the Forces of Democratic Change with several other opposition parties, most of which were in the NBC with it.

In 2021, Ahmad al-Asrawi, Secretary General of the Democratic Arab Socialist Union, stated that the founding conference of the National Democratic Front would proceed despite security pressure preventing its launch in Damascus, reaffirming the project's aim of achieving political transition and ending authoritarian rule based on negotiated political change.

In 2023, al-Asrawi participated in a High Negotiations Committee (HNC) meeting in Geneva, where he emphasized efforts to unify opposition positions on recent developments in Syria, particularly in the context of increasing regional normalization with the Syrian government.

== Post-Assad regime ==
After the fall of the Assad regime, the Democratic Arab Socialist Union reaffirmed its support for the political transition in Syria, while emphasizing the need for a democratic, pluralistic system based on citizenship, constitutional reform, and a national conference. The party called for restructuring state institutions, ensuring social justice, rejecting sectarianism and separatism, and maintaining Syria's territorial unity. It also stressed concerns about economic hardship, security threats, and external interventions, while supporting Palestinian resistance and opposing Israeli actions in Syria.
