= Ezedin Abdel Aziz Khalil =

Al-Qaeda terrorist

- Born: 1982 (age 43–44); Qamishli, Syria
- Other name: Yasin al-Suri
- Occupations: Facilitator and financier
- Organization: Al-Qaeda

Ezedin Abdel Aziz Khalil (Arabic: عز الدين عبد العزيز خليل; born 1982), also known as Yasin al-Suri (Arabic: ياسين السوري), is allegedly a senior al-Qaeda facilitator and financier based in Iran, according to the U.S. government. He is in the $3 million reward category in the U.S. Rewards for Justice Program.

== Biography ==
The U.S. State Department says that Khalil is a Syrian national, born in the city of Qamishli in 1982. He also has used other aliases such as Yaseen al-Suri, Izz al-Din Abd al-Farid Khalil and Zayn al-Abadin.

== Al-Qaeda activities ==
The U.S. government first connected Khalil to al-Qaeda when it sanctioned him as the alleged leader of an al-Qaeda fundraising and logistics network in Iran on 28 July 2011. According to the U.S. Treasury Department, Khalil has lived and operated in Iran since 2005 under agreement between al-Qaeda and the Iranian government. In his role as al-Qaeda's representative in Iran, Khalil works with the organization's senior leaders to transfer money and recruits via Iranian territory to Pakistan and Afghanistan. Khalil reportedly tasks new operatives with delivering $10,000 to al-Qaeda's leadership in Pakistan. The al-Qaeda facilitator also allegedly works with the Iranian government to release al-Qaeda members from Iranian prisons and then facilitate their travel to Pakistan. The Wall Street Journal said that the U.S. government's announcement of the Iran-based al-Qaeda network was the first time the U.S. had "formally accused Iran of forging an alliance with al Qaeda."

On 22 December 2011, the U.S. State Department further announced that as part of its Rewards for Justice Program, it was offering up to a $10 million reward for information on the location of Khalil. It also marked the first time that Rewards for Justice offered a reward for information leading to a terrorist financier. At the briefing announcing the reward for information leading to Khalil, Robert Hartung, Assistant Director for the Threat Investigations and Analysis of the Bureau of Diplomatic Security, stated, "As a key fundraiser for the al-Qaida [sic] terrorist network, he is a continuing danger to the interest of the United States, to its facility, and its citizens. Locating al-Suri and shutting down his operations would eliminate a significant financial resource for al-Qaida."

The Iranian government has rejected as "completely baseless" the charges that Khalil is present in Iran and operating within the country.

On October 20th, 2026, in a statement released by AQAP through its media branch the Al-Malahem foundation, Al-Suri was described as no longer being affiliated with Al-Qaeda, having been expelled from the organization in 2016 for embezzling donations received from supporters attempting to donate funds to AQAP.

== See also ==
- List of fugitives from justice who disappeared
