= National Coordination Committee for Democratic Change =

Syrian opposition alliance

National Coordination Committee/National Coordination Body هيئة التنسيق الوطنية لقوى التغيير الديمقراطي
- Abbreviation: NCC or NCB
- Leader: Hassan Abdel Azim
- Founded: 2011
- Headquarters: Damascus, Syria
- Ideology: Arab nationalism Democratic socialism Nasserism; Scientific socialism Marxism; Democratic confederalism
- Political position: Left-wing

The National Coordination Committee for Democratic Change (NCC), also known as the National Coordination Body for Democratic Change (NCB) (Arabic: هيئة التنسيق الوطنية لقوى التغيير الديمقراطي), is a Syrian opposition coalition formed in 2011 during the early stages of the Syrian uprising. Under Hassan Abdel Azim's leadership, thirteen left-leaning parties, Kurdish parties, independent politicians, and young activists formed the coalition. Unlike exile-based opposition groups like the Syrian National Council, the NCC was primarily rooted in Syria and emerged as one of the key organizations connected to the nation's "internal opposition."

The NCC also called for democratic political change and opposed Bashar al-Assad's authoritarian regime. However, unlike some of the other opposition groups, itrejected foreign military intervention and prioritized a political, non-military solution to the conflict through diplomatic pressure and international sanctions. The NCC has advocated dialogue with the regime if the regime would withdraw their military forces from the streets and release the political prisoners.

Being described as "the most moderate" opposition faction, the NCC proved polarizing within the Syrian opposition and was accused of being too close to the regime by other opposition actors like the SNC. Simultaneously, the NCC continued its opposition efforts inside Syria despite its limited recognition from the government or the threat of regime repression.

Following the fall of Assad in 2024, the NCC was sidelined from the political transition by Syria's new authorities and was not associated to the Syrian National Dialogue Conference.

== Background ==
The Coordination Committee is largely based inside Syria, and was formed in 2011 at a congress in Damascus as a response to the uprisings.Damascus-based lawyer Hassan Abdul Azim, the chairman, is also the spokesperson of the National Democratic Rally and the chairman of the Democratic Arab Socialist Union, a banned Nasserist opposition party. The Coordination Committee's spokesperson abroad is Haytham Manna, a Paris-based author and human rights activist, who spent three decades as a human rights activist and spokesperson for the Arab Commission for Human Rights (ACHR), which he helped create.

Their policy is built upon the "three no's", meaning "no" foreign military intervention, "no" to religious and sectarian instigation, and "no" to violence and militarization of the revolution.

The internal opposition bloc consists of 13 different groups. It gathers all of the political parties of the National Democratic Rally, formerly Syria's main secular opposition coalition, and few other organizations. It has a generally secular membership, although not exclusively so. Most member organizations have a leftist profile, while some are also strongly Arab nationalist or Kurdish nationalist. Originally the NCC had multiple Kurdish groups, but the PYD with in 2012 to form the Kurdish National Council with the other Kurdish groups.

In March 2012, the Coordination Committee was described by The New York Times as "one of Syria’s most moderate opposition groups" in the context of their demonstration where "officers in plain clothes beat them with sticks and began making arrests." Prior to September 2012, its members did not call for the dismantlement of the Syrian government or the removal of Bashar al-Assad as president, apart from their 18 March 2012 demonstration in Damascus when some of them chanted, "The people want the fall of the regime". The Coordination Committee, unlike the Syrian National Council, believed that the solution was to keep the current Syrian government, and hoped to resolve the current crisis through dialogue, in order to achieve "a safe and peaceful transition from a state of despotism to democracy".

As part of the peace talks for Syria, the NCC was part of the opposition's High Negotiations Committee, together with delegates from the Syrian National Coalition and several rebel factions including the Free Syrian Army.

=== Relation with other Syrian opposition groups ===
The NCC generally has a poor relationship with other Syrian political opposition groups. Members of the NCC have been accused of having close relations with the regime. The NCC was strongly supported by the secular leftist groups, but generally lacked support from Sunni Islamists and Liberals.

The NCC and SNC have tried to negotiate, but failed due to differences in strategy. The two main points of difference are:

1) The NCC refused to accept foreign military intervention, although it did accept various forms of support for the opposition and supported Arab League involvement in the conflict.
2) It tried to emphasise nonviolent resistance to the Syrian government, despite endorsing the Free Syrian Army.

The spokesman of the Free Syrian Army (FSA) dismissed the NCC's recognition of the FSA, stating "this is not a real opposition in Syria."

Eventually, the NCC cooperated with the Syrian National Coalition as part of the Syrian peace efforts.

== Time-line ==
At an 18 March 2012 demonstration during the Syrian civil war, a protest organised by the NCC in Damascus was smaller than countryside demonstrations. The demonstration had been announced publicly beforehand. Participants chanted, "The people want the fall of the regime". Several were beaten by security forces, and eleven members of the NCC were briefly detained.

The NCC has been hosted by Russia for talks with the Syrian government. During these talks in April 2012 SANA, the official news agency, claimed that the NCC and the government were in widespread agreement.

=== Post-China meeting ===
In September 2012 the NCC met with Chinese Foreign Minister Yang Jiechi, and called for a four-point plan which included political transition. Upon returning to Syria via Damascus International Airport, two of the NCC members who had been at the meeting in China along with another NCC member who had come to collect them were detained by the Syrian government, with all contact being lost with them since 5:30 on 20 September. The NCC spokesman Khalaf Dahowd described this detainment as kidnapping, with the NCC executive further elaborating that they believed the three members to have been "forcibly disappeared" by the Syrian Air Force Intelligence Directorate. The Syrian government on the other hand claimed that the NCC members were captured by "terrorist groups", despite having detained five other NCC members for the first time on Monday that week.

=== National Conference for Syria Salvation ===
On 23 September 2012, the NCC held a rare meeting in Damascus with Iranian, Russian and Chinese diplomats, and recognized for the first time the Free Syrian Army. It also formally called for the first time for the "overthrowing [of] the regime with all its symbols". The Preparatory Committee issued an eight-point statement which called for:

- Toppling the government.
- A rejection of sectarianism.
- Using non-violent resistance to accomplish the revolution.
- Removing the Syrian Army from the control of the regime.
- Holding the government accountable for its actions.
- The protection of civilians and the upholding of international law.
- Resolving the status of Kurds within a democratic framework.
- The undivided cohesion of the Syrian nation.

=== 2014 ===
After the pro-Assad Syrian Social Nationalist Party had withdrawn from the Popular Front for Change and Liberation, the NCC on 10 August 2014 signed a Memorandum of Understanding with the remaining Popular Front, calling for ″comprehensive grassroots change, which means the transition from the current authoritarian regime to a democratic pluralistic system within a democratic civil State based on the principle of equal citizenship to all Syrians regardless of their ethnic, religious and sectarian identities.″

=== 2019 ===
On 25 March 2019, the NCC condemned the United States' recognition of the disputed Golan Heights region as part of the State of Israel, calling on "the governments of the world and its peace-loving people" to oppose the US position.

=== 2021 ===
The NCC's chairman, Hassan Abdul Azim, denounced the 2021 Syrian presidential election as a "sham" intended to keep Bashar al-Assad in power. He said that international pressure to enact a peace plan supported by the UN was necessary for Syria's political future and that the election demonstrated the regime's lack of interest in a political settlement. A transitional government and free and fair elections overseen by the UN should result from such a process, according to Abdul Azim.

=== 2023 ===
In June 2023, reports of cooperation between the NCC and the Syrian Democratic Council, the political organization of the Kurdish-controlled areas in Northern Syria, emerged. The following principles had been agreed on:

- build a broad Syrian democratic front;
- ensure an inclusive political process under UNSC Resolution 2254;
- adopt a joint democratic national project;
- pursue a national political solution;
- combat corruption and strengthen the rule of law.

=== Post-Assad era ===
The NCB made a statement on 9 December 2024 welcoming the fall of the regime and declared they will "build a transitional phase to move from tyranny to democracy [...] and prevent a new production of tyrannical rule."

After the fall of the Assad regime, the NCC demanded equal citizenship regardless of political standpoint, gender. It called for public and political freedom for political parties, organizations and media aoutlets. They preached that political and social forces should not be disregarded, former political prisoners should receive compensation, the fate of the missing should be revealed, and the state institutions should be preserved and rebuilt.

They warned against the emergence of a new form of authoritarian rule. Therefore, the NCC suggested that there was a window created by the fall of Assad's regime for the possibility of a negotiated transitional settlement between Syrian political, military and social groups.

In a later interview, a member of the NCC executive officer Ahmad Al-Asrawi said that the new authorities should not try to rush or control the national dialogue process.

After the Syrian caretaker government announced a national dialogue conference to prepare the country's transition, Al-Asrawi stated that neither the NCC nor other Syrian political gorups had received an invitation to this conference. He also pointed out that the number of alleged participants was unrealistic and impractical, and called for a technocratic transitional regime and a well-planned national dialogue conference that would include representatives from all Syrian political and social forces.

== List of constituent parties ==
Name	Representative
Democratic Arab Socialist Union	Hassan Abdul Azim
Arab Revolutionary Workers Party	Tariq Abu Al-Hassan
Communist Labour Party	Abdul-Aziz al-Khair
Arab Socialist Movement	Munir al-Bitar
Syrian Democratic People's Party	Not represented in Executive Bureau
Together for a Free and Democratic Syria	Munther Khaddam
Democratic Union Party	Salih Muslim
Marxist Left Assembly	
Democratic Socialist Arab Ba'ath Party	Ibrahim Makhous

== See also ==
- Arab Spring
- Syrian Democratic Council
- Syrian National Council
- National Coalition of Syrian Revolutionary and Opposition Forces
- Movement for a Democratic Society
