= Rachid Mesli =

Algerian activist

Rachid Mesli (Arabic: رشيد مسلي) is an Algerian human rights lawyer and activist. He is the legal director of Alkarama, a human rights organisation based in Geneva, Switzerland.

== Career ==
In 1991, he became part of the defense lawyer team defending the case of the arrested leaders of the Islamic Salvation Front, Abbassi Madani and Ali Belhadj. On 31 July 1996, he was abducted at gunpoint from his car by four assailants who turned out to be members of the security forces. He was then detained secretly for over a week, repeatedly beaten and threatened with death, and eventually charged with belonging to a terrorist group. In July 1997, he was acquitted of this charge and instead convicted of having "encouraged terrorism", a charge that had not been brought against him in the trial and against which he had no opportunity to defend himself. Amnesty International said the trial had "clearly violated international standards for fair trial". In December 1998, his conviction was quashed by the Supreme Court; he was kept in prison while awaiting retrial, contrary to Algerian law. In June 1999, he was found guilty of belonging to a terrorist group and sentenced to three years' imprisonment. He was released in July 1999, one and a half weeks before his sentence was to end, as part of a presidential pardon. In 2000, fearing for his and his family's safety, he left the country to live in Geneva.

Since moving to Geneva, he has continued his human rights activism. In 2001, he co-founded Justitia Universalis, a non-governmental organisation dedicated to fighting impunity. In the same year, he submitted the cases of Abbassi Madani and Ali Belhadj, the detained leaders of the banned Islamic Salvation Front, to the UN Working Group on Arbitrary Detention in Geneva, which ruled that both were being detained arbitrarily, since their 1992 trial had failed to comply with international standards. This verdict greatly displeased the Algerian government, which subsequently charged Rachid Mesli with belonging to an "armed terrorist group" operating abroad, issuing an unenforceable arrest warrant. According to Amnesty International, several Algerians (Tahar Facouli, Brahim Ladada, and Abdelkrim Khider) have been arrested and tortured mainly for being in contact with him. In 2007, he co-founded Rachad, an organisation dedicated to overthrowing the Algerian government through mass nonviolent resistance.
