= Islam in Croatia =

Islam in Europe by percentage of country population 95–100%: Azerbaijan; 90–95%: Turkey; Kosovo; 50–70%: Albania; Bosnia and Herzegovina; Kazakhstan; 30–35%: North Macedonia; 10–20%: France; Georgia; Montenegro; 5–10%: Austria; Belgium; Bulgaria; Denmark; Germany; Liechtenstein; Luxembourg; Netherlands; Russia; Sweden; Switzerland; United Kingdom; 4–5%: Serbia; 2–4%: Italy; Finland; Norway; Malta; Slovenia; Spain; Greece; Cyprus (Note: Only takes into account the Muslim population residing on land controlled by the Republic of Cyprus.); 1–2%: Croatia; Ireland; Ukraine; Andorra; < 1%: Iceland; Armenia; Belarus; Czech Republic; Estonia; Hungary; Latvia; Lithuania; Moldova; Monaco; Poland; Portugal; Romania; San Marino; Slovakia

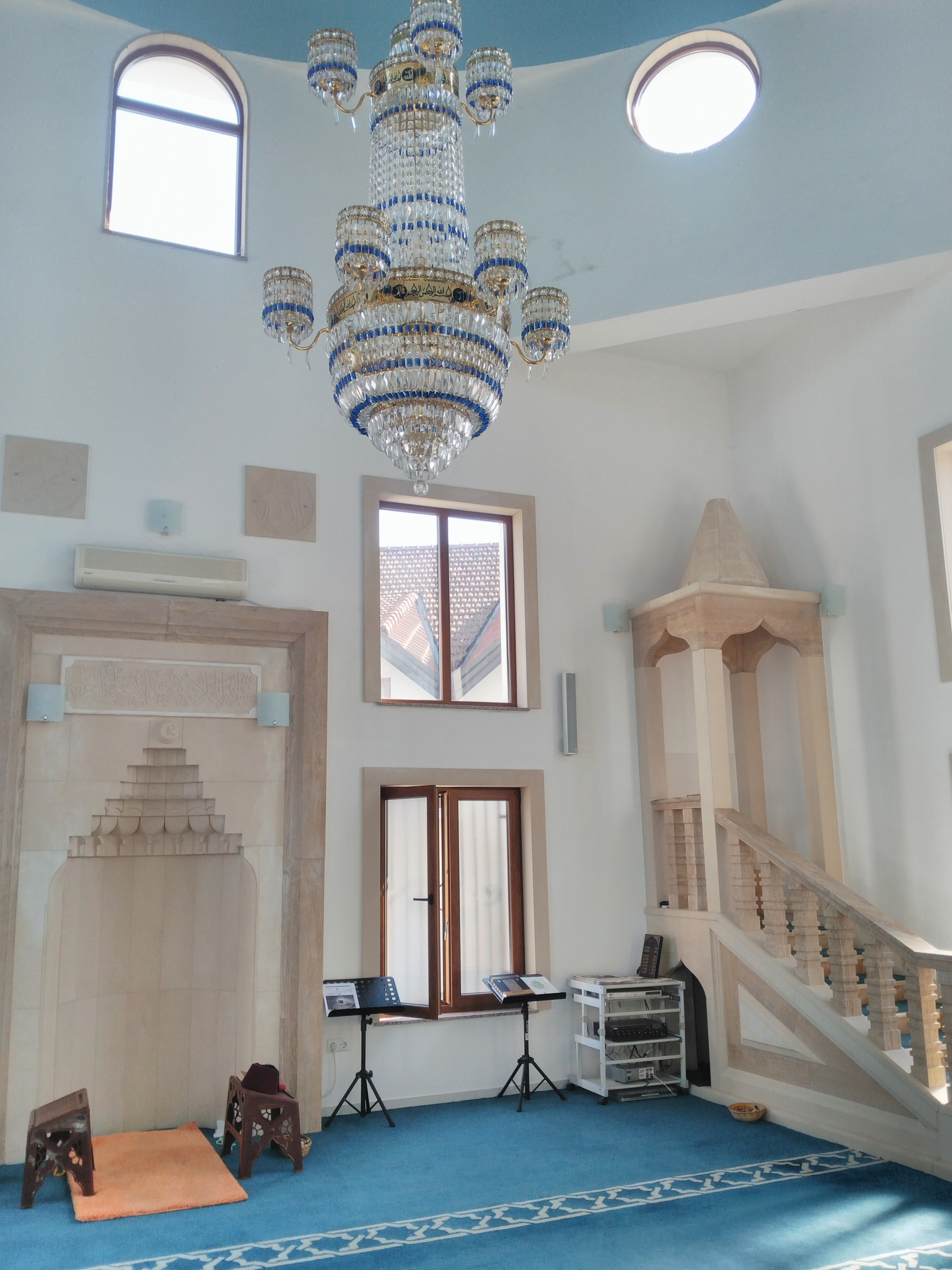
Interior of the Gunja Mosque

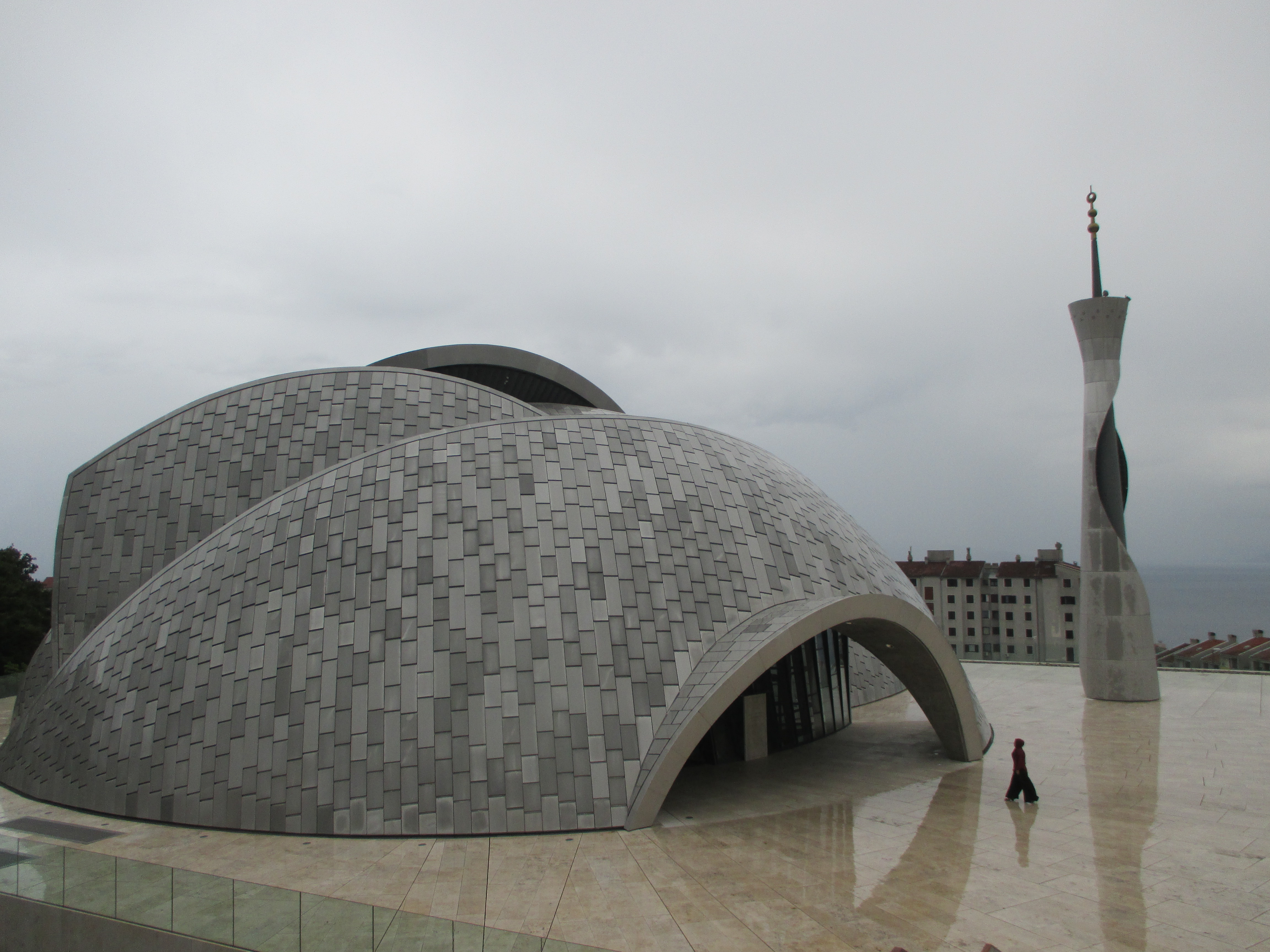
Rijeka Mosque, completed in 2013

Islam is the third-largest religion or subdivision and second-largest religion in Croatia after Roman Catholicism and Eastern Orthodoxy, which are Christian religions. The religion is followed by 1.3% of the country's population according to the 2021 census. Islam was first introduced to Croatia by the Ottoman Empire during the Croatian–Ottoman Wars that lasted from the 15th to 16th century. During this period some parts of the Croatian Kingdom were occupied which resulted in some Croats converting to Islam, some after being taken prisoners of war, some through the devşirme system. Nonetheless, Croats strongly fought against the Turks during these few centuries which resulted in the fact that the westernmost border of the Ottoman Empire in Europe became entrenched on the Croatian soil. In 1519, Croatia was called the Antemurale Christianitatis by Pope Leo X, as many other states (Armenia, Poland, even Albania).

The Islamic Community of Croatia (Mešihat Islamske Zajednice u Hrvatskoj) is the main organization of Muslims in Croatia that is officially recognized by the state. The President of the Islamic Community is Aziz Effendi Hasanović. As of 2011, 62,977 Muslims live in Croatia. Most of them declare themselves as Bosniaks (31,479) while others declare themselves as: Croats (9,647), Albanians (9,594), Roma (5,039), Turks (343), Macedonians (217), Montenegrins (159), Ahmadies (16) and other (2,420).

The first modern mosque in Croatia was built in Gunja in 1969. Today there are 4 mosques and 2 Islamic centers in Croatia (in Zagreb and Rijeka). Historically, during the Ottoman rule, there was a significantly larger number of mosques in Croatia. At one point there were 250 of them, but as of 2014 only 3 structures remained standing. The largest and most representative one of them, Ibrahim Pasha's Mosque, is located in eastern Croatian town of Đakovo but is today used as the Roman Catholic Church of All Saints. Another mosque in eastern Croatia, which today does not exist, was located in Osijek. It was the Kasım Pasha Mosque constructed after 1526 at the site of modern-day Church of Saint Michael. Most of the Ottoman structures in the region were systematically destroyed after the Treaty of Karlowitz.

Highest rate of Muslims live in Gunja municipality (34,7 % population), followed by Cetingrad (20,62 %), Raša (17,88 %), Vojnić (15,58 %), Vodnjan (14,02 %), Labin (10,68 %), Kršan (7,96 %), Sveta Nedelja (7,47 %), Drenovci (7,27 %) and Čavle (6,72 %). As of 2011, there are totally 56 municipalities in Croatia in which no Muslims live, biggest of them being Bednja with 3,992 inhabitants.

== History ==
=== Ottoman times ===
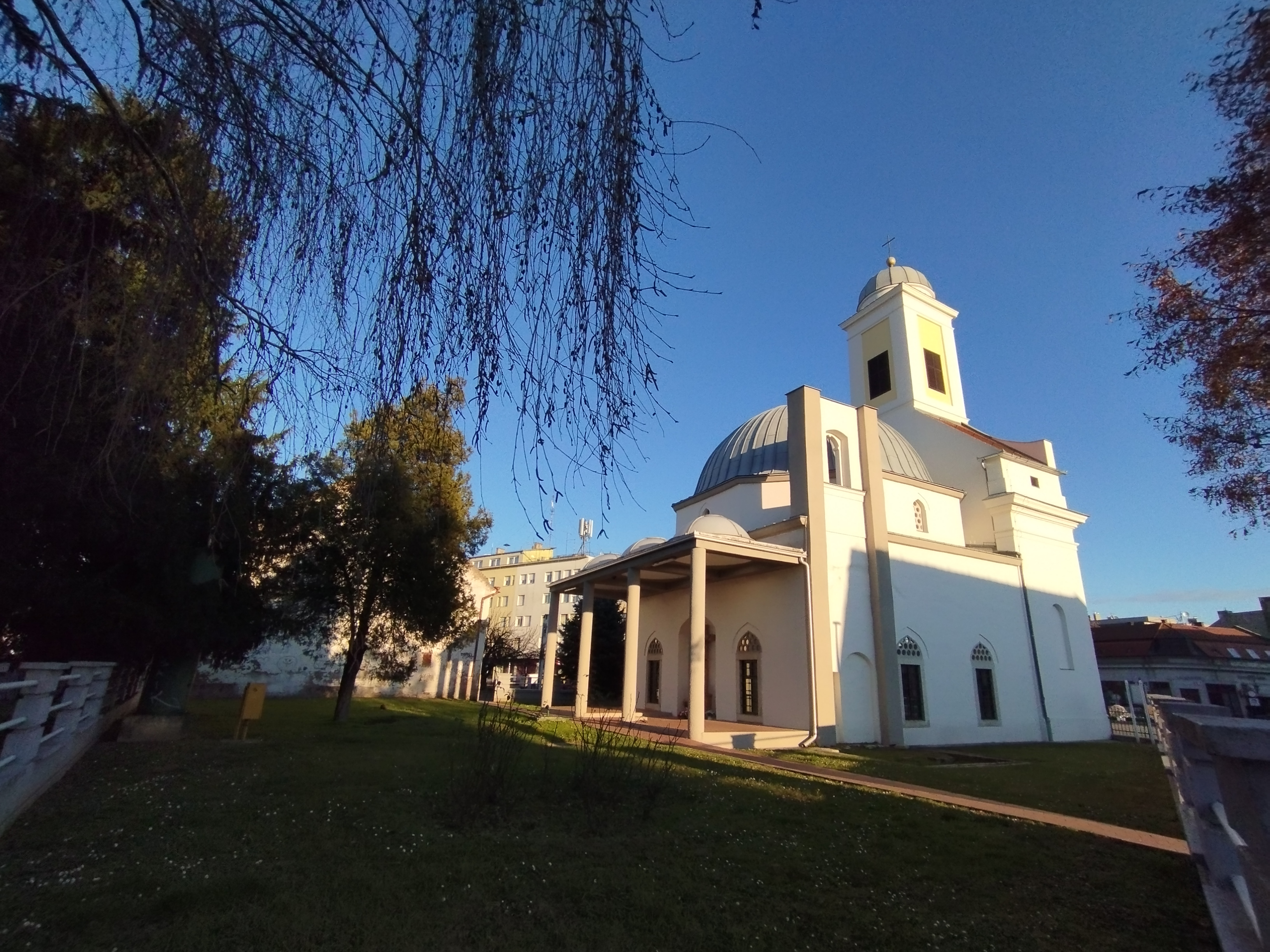
Church of the All Saints (former Ottoman era mosque) in Đakovo.

The Turkish Ottoman Empire conquered part of Croatia from the 15th to the 19th century. Numerous Croats converted to Islam, some after being taken prisoners of war, some through the devşirme system. The westernmost border of Ottoman Empire in Europe became entrenched on Croatian soil. In 1519, Croatia was called the Antemurale Christianitatis by Pope Leo X.

The historical names of many officials in the Ottoman Empire reveal their origin (Hirvat = Hrvat or Horvat, which is a Croatian name for Croat): Rüstem Pasha (Rustem Pasha Hrvat - Opuković), Piyale Pasha (Pijali Pasha Hrvat), Memipaša Hrvat, Tahvilpaša Kulenović Hrvat etc. There was some considerable confusion over the terms "Croat" and "Serb" in these times, and "Croat" in some of these cases could mean anyone from the wider South Slavic area.

In 1553, Antun Vrančić, Roman cardinal, and Franjo Zay, a diplomat, visited Istanbul as envoys of the Croatian-Hungarian king to discuss a peace treaty with the Ottoman Empire. During the initial ceremonial greetings they had with Rüstem Pasha Hrvat (a Croat) the conversation led in Turkish with an official interpreter was suddenly interrupted. Rustem Pasha Hrvat asked in Croatian if Zay and Vrančić spoke Croatian. The interpreter was then dismissed and they proceeded in Croatian during the entire process of negotiations.

In 1585, traveler and writer Marco A. Pigaffetta, in his Itinerario published in London, states: In Constantinople it is customary to speak Croatian, a language which is understood by almost all official Turks, especially military men. Crucially though, the lingua franca at the time among Slavic elites in the Ottoman Empire was still Old Church Slavonic. For Italians traveling through to Istanbul, the language of the Slavic Croats was often the only exposure they had to any of the Slavic languages; indeed, Bulgarian and Macedonian dialects were far more common in Istanbul than Croatian.

=== Since the nineteenth century ===
Muslim population in Croatia (1931-2021)
| Year | No. |
| 1931 | 4,000 |
| 1948 | 1,077 |
| 1953 | 16,185 |
| 1961 | 3,113 |
| 1971 | 18,487 |
| 1981 | 23,740 |
| 1991 | 43,486 |
| 2001 | 56,777 |
| 2011 | 62,977 |
| 2021 | 50,981 |

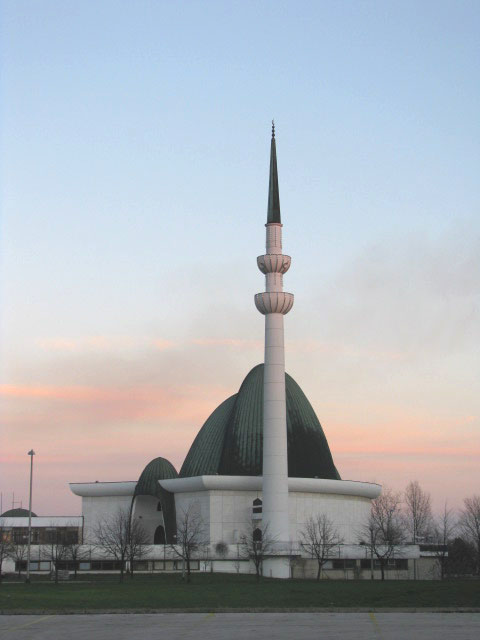
Zagreb Mosque was completed in 1987.

Within the territory of the present-day Republic of Croatia, Muslim believers were registered for the first time during the 1931 census: 1,239 of them were in Zagreb, and their overall number in Croatia was approximately 4,000.

The Quran was translated into Croatian for the first time by Džemaludin Čaušević and Muhamed Pandža in 1937.

During the Second World War the mufti of Zagreb was Ismet Muftić. After the war he was tried and eventually publicly hanged by the Partisans in 1945 because he collaborated with the fascist regime of the Croatian World War II era dictator Ante Pavelić.

In the following censuses in the People's Republic of Croatia, registered Muslim believers numbered as follows:

- 1,077 persons in 1948
- 16,185 persons in 1953
- 3,113 persons in 1961
- 18,487 persons in 1971
- 23,740 persons in 1981
- 43,486 persons in 1991

In the 1960s, the Bosnians Muslims community advocated for the recognition of the Muslims as a nationality in SFR Yugoslavia. The 1974 Yugoslav Constitution allowed for the official recognition of the Muslims as a nationality, therefore allowing more individuals to declare their alignment with a compromise categorization of ethnic Muslims (Muslimani), in this case separated from a religious basis (muslimani without capital letter). For example, Džemal Bijedić, a communist federal prime-minister was a declared "Muslim" and an atheist. The spike in the number of self-declared "Muslims" during socialist Yugoslavia times should thus be understood as persons having a family Muslim cultural background (similar to the concept of cultural Christians), rather than practicing believers in Islam. Based on the figures recorded during the 1931 to 1961 census, it may also be concluded that a certain number of Muslim believers declared themselves as Croats or Yugoslavs.

After the dissolution of Yugoslavia, an additional increase can be attributed to the influx of Bosnian Muslims that took place during and after the 1992-1996 Bosnian conflict.

The 2001 Croatian census identified a total of 56,777 adherents of Islam, or 1.3% of the total population of Croatia.

== Statistics ==
Islam in Europe by percentage of country population 95–100%: Azerbaijan; 90–95%: Turkey; Kosovo; 50–70%: Albania; Bosnia and Herzegovina; Kazakhstan; 30–35%: North Macedonia; 10–20%: France; Georgia; Montenegro; 5–10%: Austria; Belgium; Bulgaria; Denmark; Germany; Liechtenstein; Luxembourg; Netherlands; Russia; Sweden; Switzerland; United Kingdom; 4–5%: Serbia; 2–4%: Italy; Finland; Norway; Malta; Slovenia; Spain; Greece; Cyprus (Note: Only takes into account the Muslim population residing on land controlled by the Republic of Cyprus.); 1–2%: Croatia; Ireland; Ukraine; Andorra; < 1%: Iceland; Armenia; Belarus; Czech Republic; Estonia; Hungary; Latvia; Lithuania; Moldova; Monaco; Poland; Portugal; Romania; San Marino; Slovakia

The published data from the 2021 Croatian census included a crosstab of ethnicity and religion which showed that a total of 50,981 Muslims (1.32% of the total population) was divided between the following ethnic groups:

- 21,119 Bosniaks (41.43%)
- 10,841 Croats (21.26%)
- 7,421 Albanians (14.56%)
- 3,436 ethnic Muslims (6.74%)
- 3,287 Romani (6.45%)
- 4,877 Others, undeclared or unknown (9.57%)

=== By county ===
Highest number of people following Islam live in Zagreb (18,044), however highest rate of Muslims is in Istria County, where 9,965 people (4,79 % of county's population) have faith in Islam. Lowest number of people following Islam is in Krapina-Zagorje County, where are only 200 Muslims, making 0,15 % of the county's population.

| County | Number of Muslims | Percent | Municipalities with most Muslims |
|---|---|---|---|
| City of Zagreb | 18,044 | 2.28% | Peščenica-Žitnjak, Sesvete, Novi Zagreb - zapad, Trešnjevka - sjever, Stenjevec |
| Primorje-Gorski Kotar | 10,667 | 3.60% | Rijeka, Viškovo, Crikvenica, Čavle, Kastav, Mali Lošinj, Bakar, Krk, Jelenje, Omišalj |
| Istria | 9,965 | 4.79% | Pula, Labin, Vodnjan, Poreč, Umag, Raša, Rovinj, Buzet, Kršan, Sveta Nedelja |
| Sisak-Moslavina | 4,140 | 2.40% | Sisak, Petrinja, Novska, Topusko, Kutina, Hrvatska Kostajnica, Sunja, Glina |
| Zagreb | 2,961 | 0.93% | Velika Gorica, Zaprešić, Samobor, Sveta Nedelja, Rugvica, Brdovec, Dugo Selo |
| Dubrovnik-Neretva | 2,927 | 2.39% | Dubrovnik, Župa dubrovačka, Ploče, Orebić, Konavle, Metković, Korčula |
| Vukovar-Syrmia | 2,619 | 1.46% | Gunja, Drenovci, Vinkovci, Županja, Vukovar, Vrbanja, Tovarnik, Bošnjaci |
| Split-Dalmatia | 2,282 | 0.5% | Split, Kaštela, Trogir, Makarska, Solin, Omiš, Hvar, Jelsa, Gradac, Supetar, Okrug |
| Karlovac | 2,163 | 1.68% | Vojnić, Karlovac, Cetingrad, Ogulin, Draganić, Slunj, Rakovica, Duga Resa, Krnjak |
| Osijek-Baranja | 1,625 | 0.53% | Osijek, Beli Manastir, Đakovo, Donji Miholjac, Našice, Darda, Čepin, Magadenovac |
| Brod-Posavina | 1,535 | 0.97% | Slavonski Brod, Nova Gradiška, Bukovlje, Sibinj, Oriovac, Stara Gradiška |
| Zadar | 1,207 | 0.97% | Zadar, Vir, Pag, Nin, Biograd na Moru, Obrovac, Pakoštane, Tkon, Preko, Benkovac |
| Šibenik-Knin | 458 | 0.42% | Šibenik, Vodice, Knin, Skradin, Tisno, Bilice, Drniš |
| Lika-Senj | 411 | 0.81% | Gospić, Novalja, Plitvička Jezera, Senj, Udbina, Otočac, Karlobag, Perušić |
| Varaždin | 349 | 0.20% | Varaždin, Lepoglava, Novi Marof, Gornji Kneginec |
| Bjelovar-Bilogora | 335 | 0.28% | Bjelovar, Daruvar, Grubišno Polje, Garešnica, Čazma, Veliki Grđevac, Berek |
| Virovitica-Podravina | 295 | 0.35% | Virovitica, Orahovica, Pitomača, Slatina, Suhopolje, Čačinci, Čađavica, Gradina |
| Koprivnica-Križevci | 280 | 0.24% | Koprivnica, Križevci, Đurđevac, Virje, Drnje, Sveti Ivan Žabno, Kloštar Podravski |
| Požega-Slavonia | 266 | 0.34% | Požega, Pakrac, Pleternica, Lipik, Kutjevo, Kaptol, Čaglin |
| Međimurje | 248 | 0.22% | Čakovec, Belica, Nedelišće, Prelog, Mursko Središće |
| Krapina-Zagorje | 200 | 0.15% | Zabok, Bedekovčina, Donja Stubica, Oroslavje, Krapina, Pregrada, Stubičke Toplice |

== Islam today ==
Croatia's capital Zagreb has one of the biggest mosques in Europe since 1987. During the existence of the Ottoman Empire it had none because Zagreb, as well as most parts of Croatia, was not occupied by the Ottomans during the Hundred Years' Croatian–Ottoman War.

The Bosniak imam Ševko Omerbašić, was the long-time leader of the Muslim community of Croatia and the Mufti of Zagreb.

A new mosque in Rijeka was opened in May 2013.

== See also ==
- Croatian Muslims
- Bosniaks of Croatia
- Islamic Secondary School "Dr. Ahmed Smajlović"
- Ismet Muftić
- Demographics of Croatia
- Muslims (ethnic group)
- Turks in Croatia
