= Islam in Latvia =

Islam in Europe by percentage of country population 95–100%: Azerbaijan; 90–95%: Turkey; Kosovo; 50–70%: Albania; Bosnia and Herzegovina; Kazakhstan; 30–35%: North Macedonia; 10–20%: France; Georgia; Montenegro; 5–10%: Austria; Bulgaria; Sweden; Belgium; Germany; Liechtenstein; Netherlands; Switzerland; United Kingdom; Denmark; Russia; Luxembourg; 4–5%: Serbia; 2–4%: Italy; Finland; Norway; Malta; Slovenia; Spain; Greece; Cyprus (Note: Only takes into account the Muslim population residing on land controlled by the Republic of Cyprus.); 1–2%: Croatia; Ireland; Ukraine; Andorra; < 1%: Iceland; Armenia; Belarus; Czech Republic; Estonia; Hungary; Latvia; Lithuania; Moldova; Monaco; Poland; Portugal; Romania; San Marino; Slovakia

The presence of Muslims in Latvia was first recorded in the 19th century. These Muslims were mainly Tatar and Turkish people who had been taken to Latvia against their will; they included Turkish prisoners of war from the Crimean War and the Russo-Turkish War of 1877.

== History ==
After the Siege of Plevna in 1877, a few hundred Turkish prisoners were taken to the town of Cēsis, of whom 19 fell ill with several respiratory diseases and died from typhoid during the following winter or spring. They were buried in a cemetery next to the barracks they resided in. By 1879, most of the remaining Turks had returned home; however, some chose to stay.

In 1902, a Muslim congregation was officially established and recognized by the government. The community elected Ibrahim Davidof as its leader and a prayer hall was inaugurated. The majority of Muslims residing in Latvia in the early part of the 20th century were conscripted into the Russian army. After release from service, most would leave for Moscow.

During the creation of the Soviet Union and amid civil war, many refugees entered Latvia, including Muslims of various ethnicities. They were, however, known to Latvians as Turks. In 1928, Shakir Husnetdinov, a Turkic priest, was elected leader of Riga Muslim community. He held that post until 1940.

According to The Central Bureau of Statistics, there were seven Islamic groups registered in 2011, a number that had dropped to five a year later. They included Idel, a Muslim organization led by Rufia Shervireva, and Iman, a Latvian Chechen congregation led by Musan Machigov.

In 2009, the total Muslim population in Latvia was estimated to be at about 2,000 by Pew Forum. Virtually all Muslims in Latvia were Sunni, but there was also an active presence of Ahmadi. That same year, poet and translator Uldis Bērziņš finished the Latvian translation of the Quran.

== Controversy ==
After the Charlie Hebdo shooting at the beginning of 2015, Oleg Petrov, head of the Islamic Cultural Centre of Latvia, pointed out that Islam prohibits the murder of innocent civilians, but expressed a belief that the editorial team nevertheless deserved to be punished, albeit in a less severe manner. His statements suggesting that the editorial team should have instead "had their fingers broken" subsequently prompted the Internal Security Police to investigate his behavior.

On March 29, 2015, the Islamic Cultural Centre expressed concern on the growing Islamophobia in Latvia after a mosque in Riga was sprayed with graffiti that read, "Your Allah – your problem! Go home!" on the night of March 27. On September 24, the Riga municipal police broke up an unsanctioned Muslim outdoor prayer attended by around 30 men at a courtyard in Brīvības iela for violating public statutes on the organization of public entertainment and festive events.

Later that year, a representative of the Centre, Roberts Klimovičs, sparked another controversy by declaring that Latvia will become a Muslim country in 50 years. He would later go on to clarify that, "using democratic means, the majority of Latvians will elect a parliament that supports Sharia law. And we are moving towards that, without any violence or anything."

In 2016, a video of Petrov appeared on a Daesh propaganda wire in which he encouraged Jihadism and praised the Charlie Hebdo shooters. This became the third public case of a Latvian citizen joining Daesh. His comments were condemned by the new head of the Islamic Cultural Center, Jānis Luciņš, who said that the country's Muslim community felt betrayed. On October 19, 2016, a man was sentenced 140 hours of community service for hate speech against Muslims in online comments.

== See also ==
- Religion in Latvia
