= Islam in Luxembourg =

Islam in Europe by percentage of country population 95–100%: Azerbaijan; 90–95%: Turkey; Kosovo; 50–70%: Albania; Bosnia and Herzegovina; Kazakhstan; 30–35%: North Macedonia; 10–20%: France; Georgia; Montenegro; 5–10%: Austria; Bulgaria; Sweden; Belgium; Germany; Liechtenstein; Netherlands; Switzerland; United Kingdom; Denmark; Russia; Luxembourg; 4–5%: Serbia; 2–4%: Italy; Finland; Norway; Malta; Slovenia; Spain; Greece; Cyprus (Note: Only takes into account the Muslim population residing on land controlled by the Republic of Cyprus.); 1–2%: Croatia; Ireland; Ukraine; Andorra; < 1%: Iceland; Armenia; Belarus; Czech Republic; Estonia; Hungary; Latvia; Lithuania; Moldova; Monaco; Poland; Portugal; Romania; San Marino; Slovakia

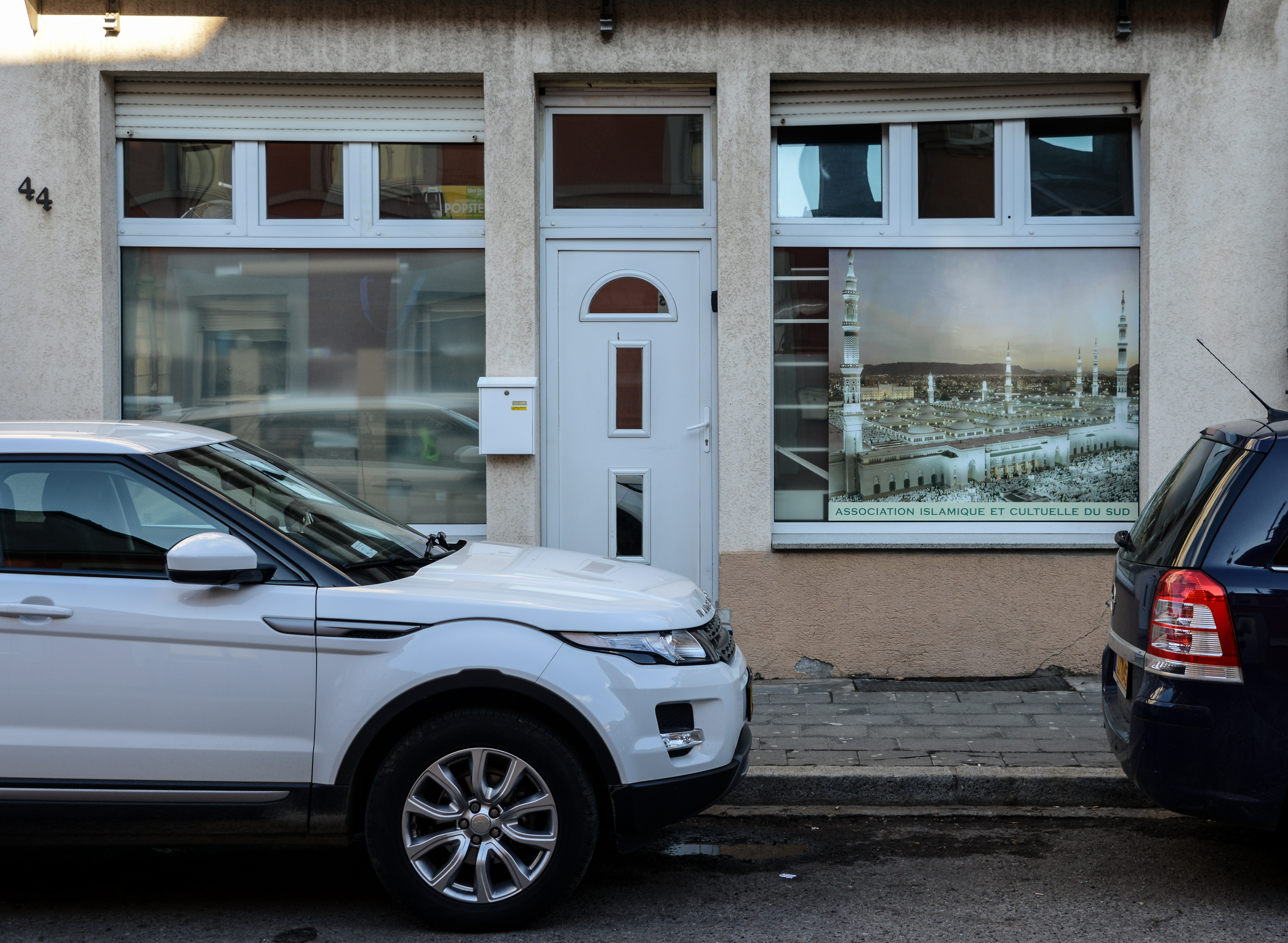
A mosque in Luxembourg

Muslims in Luxembourg are a super-minority together with: Protestants, Orthodox Christians, and Jews. Since 2015, Islam is legally recognized in the country.

== Migration ==
Until the 1970s, Luxembourg's Muslim population was small. In the mid-1970s, the Muslim population consisted of around 300 people, rising to over 3,000 by the mid-1990s. Since then, the population has doubled due to asylum-seekers from former Yugoslavia, mostly Bosniaks. The refugees came in waves and, aside from the Bosniaks, these were constituted by Muslims from Albania, Kosovo, Serbia, and Montenegro. Most asylum seekers were initially expected to stay less than a few years. Aside from the refugees, the Muslim population was also increased by workers who migrated after the labour agreement between Luxembourg and Yugoslavia. By 2013, Muslims in Luxembourg were constituted of Bosniaks (2,303), Moroccans (616), Albanians (502), Turks (487), Tunisians (374), Algerians (331), and Iranians (322).

== Population ==
The bulk of the Muslim population lives in urban areas with 70 percent residing in Luxembourg and four other cities. According to the Assembly of the Muslim Community in Luxembourg, it is estimated that about 10,000 to 15,000 Muslims presently reside in the Grand-Duchy. However, it has been illegal for the government to collect statistics on religious beliefs and practices. Furthermore, it is unclear how many are citizens of the Grand-Duchy. As of 2025, there are an estimated 40,000 Muslims living in Luxembourg, about 6% of the population.

There are currently six mosques in Luxembourg: Mamer (which is also home to the Islamic Cultural Centre), Esch-sur-Alzette, Wiltz, Diekirch and Luxembourg City. About 1,000 adults attend Friday prayers regularly in these places of worship. There is also an increasing number of converts and this is reflected in the sermons in the mosques, which are delivered in Arabic, Bosnian, French, and English.

== See also ==
- Turks in Luxembourg
