= Islam in Moldova =

Islam in Europe by percentage of country population 95–100%: Azerbaijan; 90–95%: Turkey; Kosovo; 50–70%: Albania; Bosnia and Herzegovina; Kazakhstan; 30–35%: North Macedonia; 10–20%: France; Georgia; Montenegro; 5–10%: Austria; Bulgaria; Sweden; Belgium; Germany; Liechtenstein; Netherlands; Switzerland; United Kingdom; Denmark; Russia; Luxembourg; 4–5%: Serbia; 2–4%: Italy; Finland; Norway; Malta; Slovenia; Spain; Greece; Cyprus (Note: Only takes into account the Muslim population residing on land controlled by the Republic of Cyprus.); 1–2%: Croatia; Ireland; Ukraine; Andorra; < 1%: Iceland; Armenia; Belarus; Czech Republic; Estonia; Hungary; Latvia; Lithuania; Moldova; Monaco; Poland; Portugal; Romania; San Marino; Slovakia

The vast majority of the Moldovan people are Orthodox Christians, but there is a small community of Muslims in Moldova, numbering 3,138 adherents as of the 2024 census.

In 2005, the Spiritual Organisation of Muslims in Moldova headed by Talgat Masaev was denied registration despite the appeal of the Mission to Moldova of the Organization for Security and Co-operation in Europe.

In March 2011, the Islamic League of Moldova (Liga Islamică din Moldova), an NGO representing Moldova's Muslims, was registered by the Moldovan Justice Ministry as the first legally recognized Muslim association in Moldova. It had applied for registration in 2008.

The Moldovan Orthodox Church opposed the recognition of Islam and joined protests with conservative groups.

== Demographics ==
There are 2,009 Muslims living in Moldova according to the 2014 Moldovan census, an increase from the 1,667 Muslims that lived in Moldova according to the 2004 Moldovan census. Most of the Muslims live in Chișinău (985 people), followed by Gagauzia (176 people), Bălți (76 people), Anenii Noi (68 people) and Cahul (54 people).

As of 2011, officially there were just 2,000 Muslims in Moldova. But the Islamic League of Moldova head Sergiu Sochirca said the number was closer to 17,000, though not all of them were registered as Muslims due to suppression of Islam in the past.

== See also ==
- Religion in Moldova
