= Islam in Austria =

Total population
- ~800.000 (8,3%) in 2021

Regions with significant populations
- Vienna, Vorarlberg, Salzburg, Tyrol, Upper Austria, Styria, Lower Austria

Religions
- Sunni Islam (majority), Alevism, Shia Islam

Languages
- Main: German, Turkish, Arabic, Chechen, Bosnian, Albanian, Kurdish, Persian, Somali, Urdu

Islam in Europe by percentage of country population 95–100%: Azerbaijan; 90–95%: Turkey; Kosovo; 50–70%: Albania; Bosnia and Herzegovina; Kazakhstan; 30–35%: North Macedonia; 10–20%: France; Georgia; Montenegro; 5–10%: Austria; Belgium; Bulgaria; Denmark; Germany; Liechtenstein; Luxembourg; Netherlands; Russia; Sweden; Switzerland; United Kingdom; Spain; Greece; 4–5%: Serbia; 2–4%: Italy; Finland; Norway; Malta; Slovenia; Cyprus (Note: Only takes into account the Muslim population residing on land controlled by the Republic of Cyprus.); 1–2%: Croatia; Ireland; Ukraine; Andorra; < 1%: Iceland; Armenia; Belarus; Czech Republic; Estonia; Hungary; Latvia; Lithuania; Moldova; Monaco; Poland; Portugal; Romania; San Marino; Slovakia

Islam in Austria is the largest minority religion in the country, practiced by 8.3% of the total population in 2021 according to the Statistics Austria. The majority of Muslims in Austria belong to the Sunni denomination. The first significant wave of Muslim immigration to Austria after WW2 occurred during the 1960s and 1970s, following the signing of guest worker recruitment agreements with several Southern European countries, including Turkey and Yugoslavia. During the Yugoslav Wars in the 1990s, many refugees from Bosnia and Herzegovina and Kosovo also sought refuge in Austria. A few years later, the First and Second Chechen war led to another wave of migration from the Caucasus region. Political instability and the Taliban regime in Afghanistan also led to waves of Afghan refugees arriving in Austria. During the peak of the European refugee crisis in 2015, many refugees from Iraq and Syria also arrived in Austria.

== History ==
Muslim population in Austria by the year:
Year	Pop.	±%
1971	22,267	—
1981	76,939	+245.5%
1991	158,776	+106.4%
2001	338,988	+113.5%
2011	570,876	+68.4%
2016	700,000	+22.6%
2021	745,608	+6.5%
1971, 1981, 1991 and 2001 data 2012 data, 2016 estimated data

Historian Smail Balić states that the first evidence of Muslims in Austria dates back to nomadic tribes from Asia that entered the region in 895. Following the Ottoman conquest of the Medieval kingdom of Hungary in the 16th century, more Muslims moved into the territory that makes up modern-day Austria. Muslims were expelled after the Habsburg Empire took control of the region once again in the late 17th century but a few were allowed to remain after the signing of the Treaty of Passarowitz in 1718. The Recognition Act in 1874 gave Christian and non-Christian communities including Muslims legal framework to be recognized as Religionsgesellschaften (religious societies). The largest number of Muslims came under Austrian control after the Austro-Hungarian occupation of Bosnia and Herzegovina in 1878. One estimate places the number of Muslims in Austria in 1892 at 500,000.

In 1904 Bosnian Muslim students in Vienna established the first Muslim association in Austria, the Islamitisch akademischer Verein „Zvijezda" (Islamite Academic Association "Zvijezda"). In 1907 some of its members split from it and established the second Muslim association in Vienna, the Verein der fortschrittlichen islamitischen akademischen Jugend „Svijest" (Association of Progressive Islamite Academic Youth "Svijest"). After the Annexation of Bosnia and Herzegovina in October 1908 "Svijest" organized an action committee for gaining recognition of Islam in Austria (Aktionskomitee zur Erlangung der Anerkennung des Islam in Österreich). Austria recognized Muslims ("of the hanafite rite") as a religious society and regulated their religious freedoms with the so-called Islamgesetz (Islam Law) in 1912.

After the collapse of the Austro-Hungarian Empire following World War I, only a few Muslims remained in the border of the new First Austrian Republic. In addition, Muslims from Arab and Asian countries came to Austria to study at its then renowned universities. These Muslims gathered for prayers and religious celebrations and founded Muslim faith and interfaith associations. In 1931, Mohammed Ali Binni established the intercultural and interfaith association, the Orientbund, which also had a Moslemische Sektion, that organised religious gatherings. The most significant Muslim faith association of the interwar period was the Islamischer Kulturbund, which was set up by the Egyptian-born doctor and activist Dr Zaki Ali, the pan-Arabic activist and businessman Mohammed Ali Binni and convert to Islam Baron Omar Rolf von Ehrenfels, its first president, to organize remaining and new Muslims in the country. However, the organization was promptly dissolved in 1939 following the Anschluss. Ehrenfels, being an outspoken critic of the Nazi Party, fled Austria.

In late 1942 Muslims in Vienna headed by the student Muhidin Hećimović established a religious organization called Islamische Gemeinde zu Wien (Islamic Parish in Vienna), but which due to frictions with the local Nazi authorities was rather registered as a private association under the modified name Islamische Gemeinschaft zu Wien (Islamic Community in Vienna) in 1943. In late 1943 Salih Hadžialić, an employee of the Croatian embassy in Berlin, was installed as its president due to political pressure. Although the organization was formally dissolved as a private association in Vienna in 1948, it continued its activity in Salzburg and the American zone in general as of 1945. There it was reestablished under the name Moslemische religiöse Gemeinschaft Salzburg (Moslem Religious Community Salzburg) under the protection of the U.S. Military Administration in Austria, where it was responsible for the religious care of about 1000 Muslim displaced persons.

Substantive Muslim immigration to Austria began in the 1960s when Gastarbeiter from Yugoslavia and Turkey moved to the country. The Islamische Glaubensgemeinschaft in Österreich (Community of Muslim believers in Austria) was organized in accordance to the Islamgesetz in 1979. Many Muslim refugees of the Yugoslav Wars also moved to Austria during the 1990s.

In 2013, Austria granted the status of a recognized religious community to Alevism.

In February 2015, a new Islamgesetz was passed by the Austrian parliament, criminalising foreign funding of mosques and paying salaries of imams. Contrary to reports in the media, the law does not regulate the version of the Koran that may be used in Austria, but central tenets of the religion must be presented to the authorities in German. It also gives Muslims additional rights, such as the rights to halal food and pastoral care in the military. The minister for Foreign Affairs, Sebastian Kurz, said the changes were intended to "clearly combat" the influence of Islamic extremism in Austria. The leader of Central Council of Muslims in Germany, Aiman Mazyek, called the law "positive and productive (befruchtend) for the discussion in Germany".

In October 2017, the Austrian government passed a law named the "Prohibition on the Covering of the Face." The law was introduced by the center-left Chancellor Christian Kern. Anyone wearing clothes that obscure their face in public is liable to a fine of €150 and must remove the offending garment "on the spot" if ordered by police. Many activists and experts labeled the law Islamophobic arguing that it discriminated against Muslim women who wore religious face veils. Among the opponents of the law were President Alexander Van der Bellen, Georgetown University senior research fellow Farid Hafez, and Austrian Islamic Religious Authority spokeswoman Carla Amina Baghajati. Face veils in Austria are rare, with about 100-150 Muslim women wearing some type of face covering. Prior to the passing of the ban, thousands of people protested in Vienna in January 2017 to express opposition to the law. However, in European countries, that have introduced similar laws, the bans were upheld by the European Court of Human Rights (ECHR).

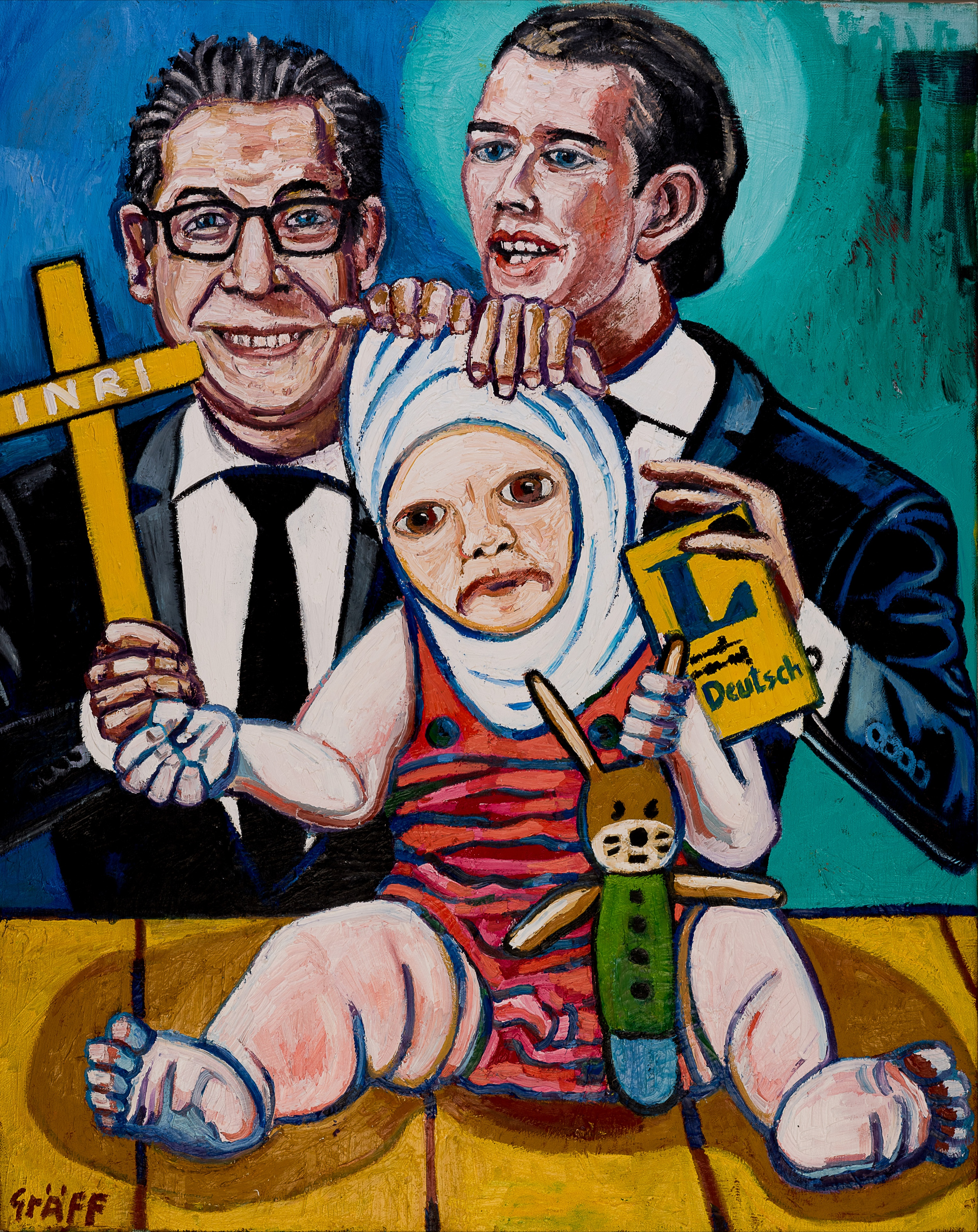
"Liebende Eltern (Loving parents)", painting about the discussion about the face-covering clothing, showing Austrian chancellor Sebastian Kurz, vice chancellor Heinz-Christian Strache and a little Muslim child by Matthias Laurenz Gräff (2018)

In 2018, chancellor Sebastian Kurz announced that Austria would close seven mosques and deport 40 imams paid by Turkey through the Diyanet organisation as measures to thwart political Islam. In the announcement parallel societies, Islamism and radicalisation were stated to have no place in Austrian society.

In October 2018, Austria banned headscarves for children in kindergarten. The ban was motivated by protecting children from family pressure to wear the headscarf. According to an Austrian teachers' union, a ban for pupils aged up to 14 years should be considered as that is the religious legal age (German: religionsmündig).

In March 2019, the cabinet announced that it aims to create a new institution, which should from 2020 monitor and document activities regarding political Islam in the country. Citing studies which show that a significant number of Austrian Muslims hold anti-western and antisemitic views, Kurz said that it would be necessary to monitor mosques, clubs, ideology and social media contributions in context with fundamental Islam in order to protect the liberal, democratic and secular society. The organisation should get a similar role on Islamic extremism as the Documentation Centre of Austrian Resistance (DÖW) has on right-wing extremism, according to the cabinet. Leading figures from the DÖW have principally welcomed the government's plan and confirmed that there is a need to take a closer look at the dangers of political Islam.

=== Population by year ===
Year	Muslim population	Total population	% of total population
1971	22,267	7,500,000	0.30%
1981	76,939	7,569,000	1.02%
1991	158,776	7,755,000	2.05%
2001	338,988	8,042,000	4.22%
2011	570,876	8,464,000	6.75%
2021	745,608	9,000,000	8.3%

== Demographics ==
The 2021 census in Austria found that there were 745,608 Muslims living in the country, making up 8.3% of the population. Statistics Austria estimated in 2009 that 515,914 Muslims lived in Austria. Work by Ednan Aslan and Erol Yıldız that used data from the 2009 Statistics Austria report estimated that 573,876 Muslims lived in Austria in 2012, making up 6.8% of the population.

The majority of Muslims in Austria are Austrian citizens. The most common foreign citizenships among Muslims in Austria are Turkish (21.2%), Bosnian (10.1%), Kosovar (6.7%), Montenegrin (6.7%), and Serbian (6.7%).

Almost 216,345 Austrian Muslims (38%) live in the capital, Vienna. Roughly 30% of Muslims live in northern state outside of Vienna and an equal number (30%) live in the southern states of Austria.

=== Ethnicity ===
The majority of Austrian Muslims have a Turkish or Bosnian (specifically Bosniak) background.

Nationality	Population	Year
Turks	400,000	
Bosniaks	120,000	
Arabs	100,000	
Afghans	50,720	
Kurds	26,770	
Chechens	25,000	
Pakistanis	14,000	
Iranians	12,452	

== Branches ==
An August 2017 survey by the Bertelsmann Stiftung foundation found that among Austrian Muslims, 64% were Sunni and 4% were Shia. Medien-Servicestelle Neue Österreicher estimated in 2010 that 10-20% of Austrian Muslims were Alevi.

== Identity ==
Almost 88% of Austrian Muslims feel closely connected with Austria and more than 62% of Muslims have routine leisure time contact with people of other religions, according to the Bertelsmann survey from August 2017. The same survey was also implemented in Germany and several right-wing German newspapers, including Die Welt, Frankfurter Allgemeine Zeitung, Wirtschaftswoche have called the results concerning "close connection" superficial and too optimistic, because the study does not contain any information as to whether participants' values are compatible with western values

Turkish president Recep Tayyip Erdoğan, whose political style is described as increasingly authoritarian and undemocratic, and his Islamic-conservative AKP Party gained huge election successes with Turkish citizens in Austria with up to 70 percent of votes. Critics see this as a clear sign of failed integration. In 2016 Sebastian Kurz, then foreign minister, from the ÖVP and some FPÖ members have urged participants of a pro-Erdoğan demonstration to leave Austria.

== Religiosity and fundamentalism ==
In an August 2017 survey by the Bertelsmann Stiftung foundation, 42% of Austrian Muslims said they were "highly religious" and 52% were "moderately religious."

Austrian Muslims show high fundamental religious values and hostility against other groups according to a study that was published by WZB Berlin Social Science Center in 2013. Different approval rates also persisted after factors such as education, income, marital status, age and gender were taken into account, the study concluded that the reason is to some extent the religion.

Statement	Percentage of people who agree with the statement	
Statement	Muslims	Christians
Muslims (Christians) should return to the roots of Islam (Christianity).	65%	27%
There is only one interpretation of the Koran (the Bible) and all Muslims (Christians) must adhere to it.	79%	18%
The rules of the Koran (the Bible) are more important to me than the laws of Austria.	73%	13%
Percentage of people who agree with all three statements.	55%	4%
I do not want to have homosexuals as friends.	69%	15%
You can not trust Jews.	63%	11%
Western countries want to destroy Islam. (Muslims want to destroy Western culture.)	66%	25%
Percentage of people who agree with all three statements.	43%	3%

=== 2020 raid: Operation Luxor ===
On 9 November 2020, Austrian authorities undertook police action against networks of Hamas and Muslim Brotherhood in the country and 60 locations were searched. During the raids, 70 people were apprehended on suspicion of belonging to a terrorist organization, money laundering and the financing of terrorist activities. In August 2021, the Graz Higher Regional Court ruled that the house searches were unlawful.

== Culture ==
A Tag der offenen Moschee (Open Mosque Day) was first organized in October 2013 with the aim of building interfaith connections between Austrian Muslims and non-Muslims. The event has continued every year since.

== Education and income ==
According to the MIPEX Index, access barriers to the labor market for immigrants are relatively low but unemployment is significantly more common among Muslims than among the average population at large. Approximately 40% Muslims born in Austria leave school before age 17.

== Religious infrastructure ==
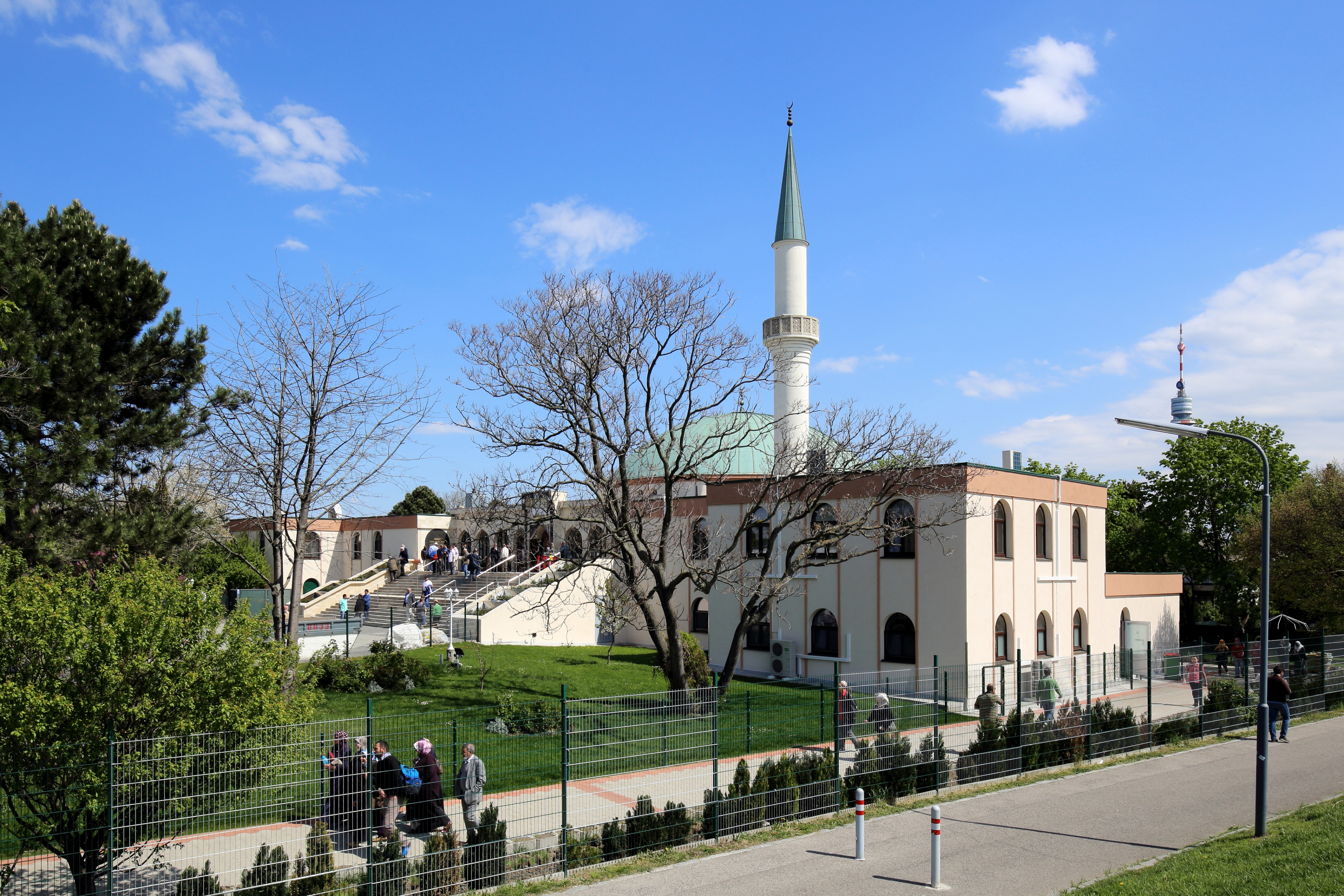
Mosque and Islamic centre in Vienna.

There are 205 registered mosques in Austria with hundreds more unregistered prayer rooms. There are four mosques in the country that were purpose-built with minarets.

Despite a large amount of Balkan Muslims in the country, most Muslim organizations in Austria are dominated by Turks. The largest Muslim organization in the country is the Islamische Glaubensgemeinschaft in Österreich (Community of Muslim believers in Austria). The Glaubensgemeinschaft has two constituent members, the Austrian Turkish Islamic Union and the Islamic Federation. Muslim Youth Austria is part of the Bundesjugendvertretung (National Youth Representation) mainly focuses on interfaith dialogue with Catholics, Jews, Buddhists and other religious groups in the country. Muslim Youth Austria also campaigns against xenophobia and racism. Alevis in Austria have set up community groups such as the Islamische Alevitische Glaubensgemeinschaft (Muslim Alevi Community in Austria) and the Föderation der Aleviten Gemeinden in Österreich (Federation of Alevi Communities in Austria).

== Discrimination ==
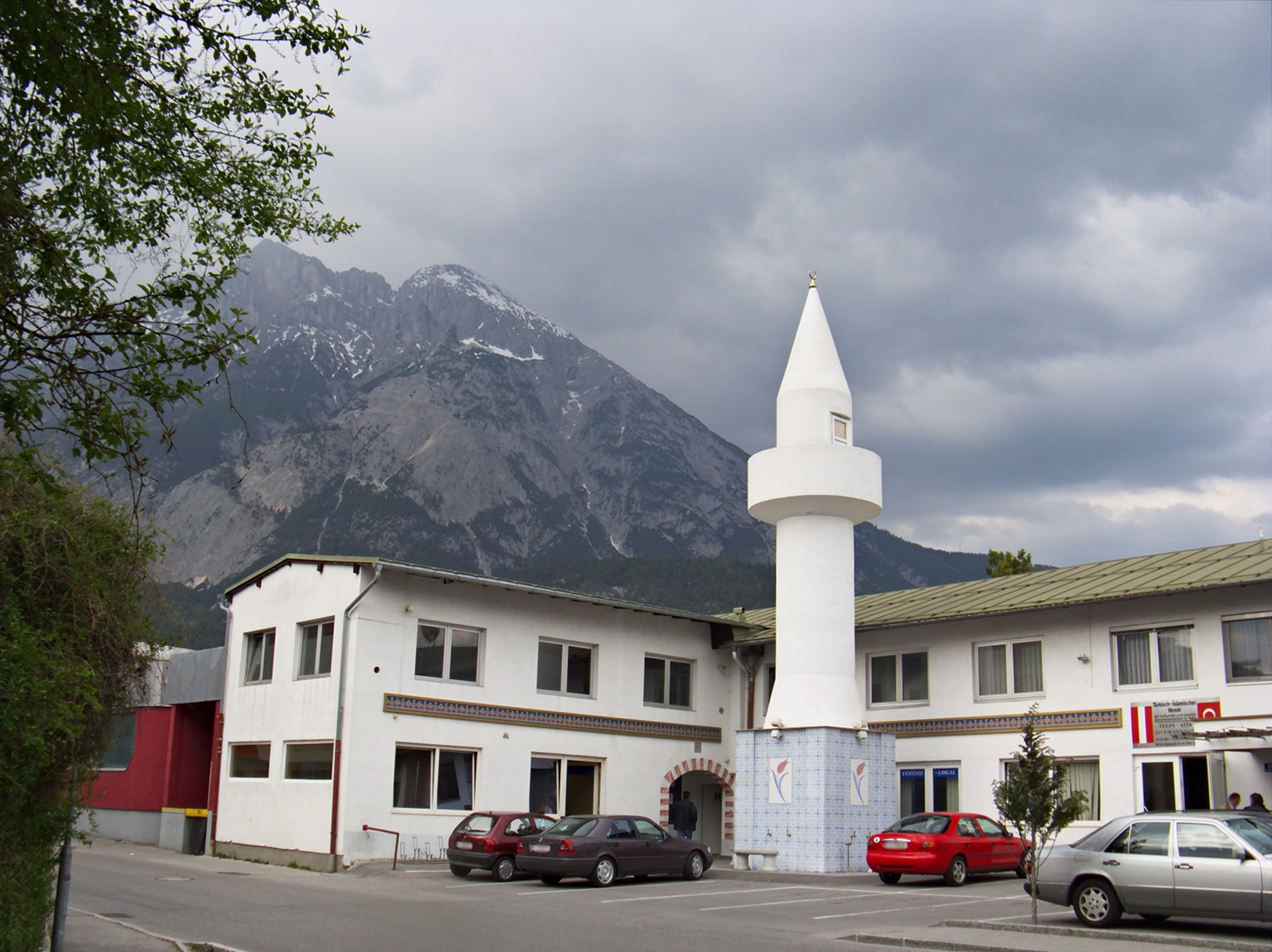
A Mosque in Telfs.

According to the Rassismus Report 2014, the two most impactful sources of anti-Muslim sentiment in Austria are the tabloid, Neue Kronenzeitung, and the Freedom Party of Austria.

In a 2017 Chatham House survey 65% of Austrians supported the statement: "All further migration from mainly Muslim countries should be stopped", while 18 percent disagreed. In a 2018 poll by Der Standard 45 percent answered that they would tolerate a street scene that is dominated by women wearing headscarves, 42 percent would not tolerate it.

=== Opposition ===
In April 2017, President Alexander Van der Bellen said that there may come a day when we will have to ask all women in Austria to wear headscarves in solidarity with Muslim women and to fight what he referred to as "rampant Islamophobia" in the country.

== Notable Muslims ==
- Smail Balić, historian
- Muhammad Asad, journalist, traveler, and writer.
- Muna Duzdar, state secretary in the Federal Chancellery.
- Aribert Heim, SS doctor, hid in Egypt as Tarek Farid Hussain.
- Farid Hafez, academic.
- Baron Omar Rolf von Ehrenfels, journalist

== See also ==
- Baron Omar Rolf von Ehrenfels
- Arabs in Austria
- Turks in Austria
- Syrians in Austria
- Bosniaks

== Sources ==
- Öktem, Kerem (30 October 2015). "Austria". In Scharbrodt, Oliver; Akgönül, Samim; Alibašić, Ahmet; Nielsen, Jørgen; Racius, Egdunas (eds.). Yearbook of Muslims in Europe, Volume 7. BRILL. ISBN 9789004308909.
- Çakır, Alev; Schmidinger, Thomas (31 October 2014). "Austria". In Nielsen, Jørgen; Akgönül, Samim; Alibašić, Ahmet; Racius, Egdunas (eds.). Yearbook of Muslims in Europe, Volume 6. BRILL. ISBN 9789004283053.
