= Islam in Slovenia =

Islam in Europe by percentage of country population 95–100%: Azerbaijan; 90–95%: Turkey; Kosovo; 50–70%: Albania; Bosnia and Herzegovina; Kazakhstan; 30–35%: North Macedonia; 10–20%: France; Sweden; Georgia; Montenegro; 5–10%: Austria; Belgium; Bulgaria; Denmark; Germany; Liechtenstein; Luxembourg; Netherlands; Russia; Switzerland; United Kingdom; Spain; Greece; 4–5%: Serbia; 2–4%: Italy; Finland; Norway; Malta; Slovenia; Cyprus (Note: Only takes into account the Muslim population residing on land controlled by the Republic of Cyprus.); 1–2%: Croatia; Ireland; Ukraine; Andorra; < 1%: Iceland; Armenia; Belarus; Czech Republic; Estonia; Hungary; Latvia; Lithuania; Moldova; Monaco; Poland; Portugal; Romania; San Marino; Slovakia

The Muslims in Slovenia are ethnically mostly Bosniaks and ethnic Muslims. In 2014, there were 48,266 Muslims in Slovenia, making up about 2 percent of the total population. The Muslim community of Slovenia is headed by Nedžad Grabus. There are also a few Muslim migrant workers from Central Asia; however, they are not counted in the census, because they are not citizens of Slovenia.

== History ==
Muslims first appeared in the territory of present-day Slovenia in the early 15th century as raiders and prisoners of war during Ottoman incursions. Small, mostly temporary Muslim populations settled only after Austria-Hungary occupied Bosnia and Herzegovina in 1878. A short-lived Islamic religious community (džemat) existed in Ljubljana from 1934 to 1941.

According to the historian Boris Golec, the Slovenes are the only South Slavic people whose ethnic territory was never occupied by the Ottoman Empire or integrated into its administration. The one exception was eastern Prekmurje, then part of the Kingdom of Hungary. After the end of the Long War (1606) it remained under dual Hungarian–Ottoman rule until 1664, and Ottoman officials sometimes collected taxes in the villages themselves.

Despite belonging to Western Christendom, the Slovenes lived close to Muslim populations: the distance from Slovenia's south-eastern border to the north-western edge of Bosnia and Herzegovina is only 50 kilometres (31 mi) in a straight line. The westernmost part of Ottoman Bosnia, the Cazin Krajina, was the western tip of the Ottoman Empire until 1878. Slovenes called all Muslims of the Ottoman state "Turks" (Turki). Fear of the Turks, reinforced by 19th-century literature, became one of the foundations of Slovene national consciousness.

Golec divides the Muslim presence in Slovenian lands into three periods: the era of Ottoman raids and prisoners of war until the end of the 17th century, a "silent period" of almost two centuries of peaceful coexistence, and a third period beginning with the occupation of Bosnia and Herzegovina in 1878, which splits at the end of World War I.

=== Early modern period (15th century – 1699) ===
Apart from the Ottoman soldiers themselves, Muslims reached the Slovenian lands mainly through forced migration and enslavement, as elsewhere in the Holy Roman Empire. Ottoman raids on the Slovenian lands lasted from 1408 to 1574 and were aimed almost entirely at plunder, so prisoners were rarely taken. Turkish prisoners are first attested in 1475 in Ljubljana, where they are said to have helped fortify the city. Their numbers grew from the 16th century, when raiders from the Croatian Military Frontier, including nobles from the Slovenian lands, increasingly attacked Ottoman territory. They preferred to capture women and girls, who were the most valued and most easily ransomed prisoners. Not every "Turk" was a Muslim: some prisoners were Christians, and the martolozi (Ottoman auxiliaries) who settled in the forests of Kočevje and Inner Carniola in the late 16th century were not Muslims either.

Prisoners in Austrian and German lands were generally not treated harshly. They worked on noble estates, in crafts and, in the case of women, in households. Baptism changed a prisoner's legal status from "slave" to hereditary subject and offered wide opportunities for integration, in theory even education, a career or a noble title. Golec stresses that the motives for accepting baptism varied and were often tactical, since many baptized prisoners tried to flee home after the peace of 1699. He considers the claim that all were forced to convert too sweeping.

The earliest baptisms of Ottoman subjects in the Slovenian ethnic territory are documented in Ljubljana in 1594, shortly after the Habsburg victory at Sisak (1593). Golec's survey of parish registers found 105 documented baptisms between 1594 and 1717. Of these, 89 (84.8 per cent) took place during the Great Turkish War of 1683–1699, when the imperial court encouraged baptism. Women made up 59 of the 105 (56.2 per cent). Ljubljana (27), Maribor (16), Gorizia and Klagenfurt (9 each) and Ptuj (7) had the most cases. For comparison, more than a thousand prisoners were baptized in the Austrian hereditary lands as a whole during the war. During the war many captives came from the Pannonian Basin, while earlier ones came mostly from the western Balkans.

The later lives of the baptized are poorly documented, because registers almost never record surnames. The best-documented case is Anton Husić (Husič), baptized before 1690 in south-eastern Carniola on the Croatian border. In 1707 Count Johann Adam von Purgstall, commander at Ogulin, rewarded his long service on the Military Frontier with a house and land at Pobrežje (Freithurn). The family and its surname survive on part of that land today, and in one register of 1694 he appears as "Anton Turek". In German-speaking lands it was common for baptized Muslims to keep their old names as surnames, but Golec warns that Muslim-sounding surnames are unreliable evidence of origin: the farm names Hožič and Murat in the Pohorje derive from Hasič and Maierhold.

=== The "silent period" (1699–1878) ===
After the Treaty of Karlowitz, the balance of power between Austria and the Ottomans stabilized and migration of Muslims into the Slovenian lands almost stopped. A few baptized Ottoman subjects may still have stayed permanently (four are documented between 1699 and 1717). Individual Muslims stayed temporarily for business, above all in Trieste after it became a free port in 1719; a Muslim cemetery has existed there since the mid-19th century. In 1831 four young Egyptians trained as cloth-makers and stocking-weavers in Upper Carniola. Before 1848 the first Muslim guests, some from Syria and Egypt, visited the spa at Rogaška Slatina.

Between 1854 and 1858 the priest Luka Jeran and the Ljubljana Catholic journal Zgodnja Danica raised money to buy the freedom of Black children and former slaves in Egypt and the Sudan and bring them to Carniola. At least four, all Muslims, were baptized there: two boys in Ljubljana and two girls in Škofja Loka. Most died young, and the two who reached adulthood became vagrants.

=== Late Habsburg period and World War I (1878–1918) ===
Golec calls 1878 the most important turning point in relations between the Slovenian lands and the Muslim world. The Austro-Hungarian occupation of Bosnia and Herzegovina (annexed in 1908) placed most Slovenian lands in one political framework with a predominantly Muslim region. For the first time Muslims could settle permanently in Slovenian lands, and a period of centuries of real and latent conflict ended. Censuses between 1880 and 1910 recorded very few Muslims, grouped under "other religions", and Golec believes the real numbers were higher. In 1910 Trieste had 191 Muslims (144 soldiers and 47 civilians).

In 1912 Islam became a state-recognized religion in the Austrian half of the monarchy and in 1916 in the Hungarian half, but this had no practical effect in the Slovenian lands, where no Islamic community could yet be founded.

During World War I thousands of Bosnian Muslim soldiers fought on the Isonzo Front, along the western edge of the Slovenian ethnic territory. It was the largest concentration of armed Muslims there since 1532, when the main Ottoman army crossed the region, but now they were welcome defenders. In 1916 or 1917 soldiers built a small mosque at Log pod Mangartom, near Kobarid (Caporetto), the first mosque on Slovenian territory. It was probably never consecrated because of the Battle of Caporetto, and it was demolished soon after the war.

=== Interwar Yugoslavia (1918–1941) ===
After 1918 the Slovenian ethnic territory was split among four states. Only "Yugoslav Slovenia", about two thirds of it, became a destination for Muslim migrants, now from Bosnia and Herzegovina and from the southern Serb regions. Golec identifies three features of the period: soldiers dominated, especially in the 1920s; civilian migrants moved in and out frequently; and civilians were almost all working-age men in particular trades, joined only in the late 1930s by a few women and children.

The 1921 census counted 649 Muslims in present-day Slovenia, 60 per cent of them in Ljubljana (236) and Maribor (154). Most were soldiers, and many of the Turkish- and Albanian-speakers were stationed on the Hungarian border in Prekmurje. By 1931 the number had risen to 927, about 0.08 per cent of the population of the Drava Banovina, and Prekmurje had only 15 as most troops had left. Muslims now lived in 58 municipalities, mainly because of economic migrants and state employees such as gendarmes, customs officers and border guards.

Civilian Muslims in the late 1930s worked mostly as railway workers and confectioners, along with construction workers, gendarmes and seasonal carpet sellers. The confectioners came mainly from western Macedonia and were almost certainly Albanians. Railway workers rose in number after 1935, when the Yugoslav Muslim Organization joined the government, and by 1938 they were the largest occupational group (29 per cent of active Muslim men). Two censuses of civilian Muslims recorded 73 people in 1935 and 151 in 1938. The real number was higher, and at its peak just before 1941, with soldiers, probably well over a thousand. The censuses also listed nine or ten adult converts to Islam, among them Slovene intellectuals such as Alojzij (Alija) Košir, Rado Kregar, Lojz (Ali) Kraigher and Vladimir (Halid-Velid) Levstik. Most converted for practical reasons, for example to remarry after a divorce.

Soldiers were looked after by a military imam, but civilians had no place of worship for a long time. A request in 1929 to set up a prayer room in a Ljubljana confectioner's shop was refused. In mid-1934, on the decision of the ulema medžlis in Sarajevo, an Islamic religious community (džemat) began work in Ljubljana with authority over the whole Drava Banovina. Its imams, Mehmed Ahmetašević (1934–1937) and Halil Imamović (1937–1941), were also military imams, and in practice prayers and rites took place inside army barracks. In early 1939 there was no mosque in the banovina, only a prayer room in each garrison. Golec doubts that Muslims in Slovenia in these years formed a community or religious congregation in the full sense, given their geographic spread and heterogeneity. The džemat ceased to function when Imamović moved to Zagreb on 1 June 1941, apparently without formal abolition. It was refounded 35 years later.

=== Second World War and Yugoslav period (1941–1991) ===
The occupation and partition of Yugoslavia in 1941 brought a deep break for the Muslim population in Slovenia. Many Muslims left or were expelled from the German and Hungarian occupation zones, and most apparently did not return after the war, although a few, mainly from mixed marriages, and some confectioners did. The only Muslim documented as living in Slovenia under the Dual Monarchy, throughout the first Yugoslavia and in its successor was the shoemaker Ahmed Rekić from Banja Luka, who lived in Maribor from 1915. After 1945 the new communist system was unfavourable to religion, and more than two decades passed before the Islamic community was organized again. Yugoslav censuses counted Bosnian Muslims as an ethnic group in 1961 and as a nationality from 1971.

Slovenia became a destination for internal migrants from the other Yugoslav republics. People from Bosnia had started to settle there in the 1940s, but Muslims arrived in large numbers for economic reasons in the late 1960s and the second half of the 1970s. The migrants were attracted by free vocational training, scholarships, housing benefits and guaranteed jobs in industry, catering and tourism. They came mostly from Bosnia and the border area with Croatia, later also from Kosovo, Macedonia and Montenegro, and according to the Muslim activist Ahmed Pašić mostly from Bosanska krajina and Sandžak. The Muslim share of Slovenia's population was 0.045 per cent (668 people) in 1953, and by 2002 it had grown about 71-fold.

Islam was long almost invisible in public life, with no mosques, separate cemetery sections or halal butchers. Organized religious life began in the winter of 1962, during Ramadan, when ten Muslims gathered in a private flat in Ljubljana. Within a year the group had grown to about fifty and was meeting in a barracks near the city dairy. On 12 September 1967 the first committee of the Islamic Community in Slovenia was founded in Ljubljana with help from the Islamic communities of Sarajevo and Zagreb, and children began to receive informal religious instruction in private flats in Ljubljana and Jesenice. The first public mevlud ceremonies were held in 1969 in Ljubljana, Jesenice and Kranj, with about 400 people attending at Jesenice. In the same year the head of the Islamic Community of Bosnia and Herzegovina asked the Ljubljana authorities for a site for a mosque, when about 3,000 Muslims lived in Slovenia.

The Islamic Community was formally registered only in 1976, under the Yugoslav law on the legal status of religious communities. The first prayer room (mesdžid) of the Slovenian community opened in 1981 in a converted house at Grablovičeva 14 in Ljubljana, and a second in 1987 in a former stable in Jesenice. Until the 1990s the community was registered only in these two towns.

=== Independent Slovenia (1991–present) ===
After Slovenia became independent in 1991, immigrants from other Yugoslav republics with registered permanent residence could acquire Slovenian citizenship. When the Bosnian War began in 1992, about 45,000 refugees came to Slovenia, around 80 per cent of them Bosniak Muslims according to one estimate, although other estimates of the number of refugees vary widely. They were never granted refugee status under the Geneva Convention but only "temporary refuge" (1992–2003), which gave them limited rights, and the status had a legal basis only from 1997. Most left before the war ended, and some returned to Bosnia in 1997–1998. Of the 2,500 Kosovo refugees of 1999, who were also mostly Muslim, nearly all returned within a year. The demographer Danilo Dolenc estimates that at least 8,000 refugees from Bosnia settled permanently.

The refugees brought the first imams, and twelve new local congregations (džemati) and prayer rooms followed in towns including Velenje, Maribor, Koper, Kranj and Celje. On 18 December 1994 the Islamic Community in Slovenia became an independent unit of the Islamic Community of Bosnia and Herzegovina, with its own governing body, the Meshihat, in Ljubljana. Osman Đogić was inaugurated as its first mufti on 5 October 2001. Alongside it a smaller organization, the Slovenian Muslim Community, also exists.

The 2002 census counted 47,488 Muslims, or 2.4 per cent of the population. Kalčić argues that these figures do not reflect the real situation, because many residents did not answer the questions on ethnicity and religion. More than a third of Muslims lived in and around Ljubljana, which had the largest numbers, followed by Jesenice, Velenje, Maribor and Koper. A 2022 public opinion survey found that 5 per cent of Slovenes identify as Muslim, and the Islamic Community itself estimates about 100,000 Muslims, or 5 per cent. Most are Hanafi Sunnis of Balkan, mainly Bosnian, origin, and in the last decade more Muslims from Kosovo, Albania and North Macedonia have settled in Slovenia.

The long effort to build a mosque in Ljubljana shaped public debate. Kalčić argues that opponents used orientalist images of Islam and the Ottoman raids, and that this discourse was used in pre-election campaigning in 2004. Until then the community rented sports halls in Ljubljana for the two main festivals, when about 4,000 believers gathered. The foundation stone of the Islamic Cultural Centre in Ljubljana was laid on 14 September 2013, 44 years after the first request. Slovenia's first purpose-built mosque opened on 3 February 2020. It holds up to 1,400 people and is the core of a six-building complex. Of its cost of about 34 million euros, about 28 million came from Qatar.

== Demographics ==
Demographics of Muslims In Slovenia by ethnicity in 2002

Ethnicity	Muslims	Percentage
Bosniaks	19,923	41.95%
ethnic Muslims	9,328	19.64%
"Bosnians" (otherwise undeclared)	5,724	12.05%
Albanians	5,237	11.03%
Slovene Muslims	2,804	5.90%
Roma	868	1.83%
Montenegrins	634	1.33%
Macedonians	507	1.07%
"Yugoslavs" (otherwise undeclared)	55	0.12%
Serbs	53	0.11%
Croats	30	0.06%
Hungarians	8	0.02%
Undeclared or unknown	1,846	3.89%
Others	445	0.94%
Regionally declared	15	0.03%
Total	47,477	100%

== Muslim buildings in Slovenia ==
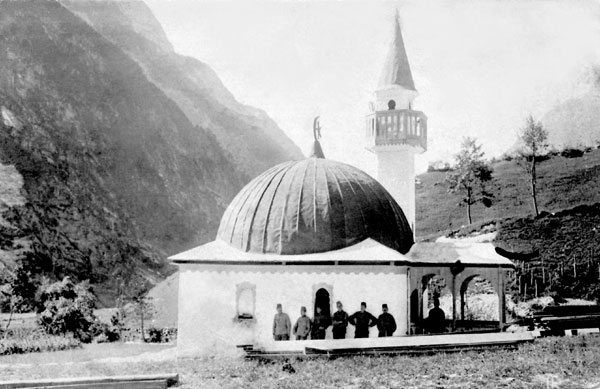
An old Austro-Hungarian Mosque in Log pod Mangartom, pulled down after World War I

There was a mosque in Log pod Mangartom, a village now in the extreme northwest of Slovenia, Log pod Mangartom Mosque, built by the Bosnian-Herzegovinian Infantry Regiment No. 4 during World War I and probably demolished soon after the war. In 2013, works begun to build a mosque in Ljubljana, to be completed in 2016.

=== Ljubljana Mosque ===
In September 2013 the foundation stone was laid for a mosque to be 70% funded by Qatar 44 years after the a petition was filed to build a mosque. The mosque will include a cultural centre at a cost of US$16 million to be completed in 2016 with construction commencing in November. The groundbreaking was attended by Prime Minister Alenka Bratušek who said the building would be a "symbolic victory against all forms of religious intolerance" and that Europe would not be as culturally rich without Islam. There were about 10,000 others in attendance including Ljubljana Mayor Zoran Jankovic and an unnamed government minister from Qatar. Slovenia's highest Islamic authority Mufti Nedzad Grabus said: "We are happy to be starting this civic project in Ljubljana, which will thus become a better-known and a more pluralistic city." The ceremony was also attended by the Bosniak member of the Presidency of Bosnia and Herzegovina Bakir Izetbegović. Other attendees were former President of Slovenia Danilo Turk and Mufti of the Islamic Community in Bosnia and Herzegovina Husein Kavazović. The project had faced administrative hurdles and was a political risk in a majority Roman Catholic country. It also faced a possible referendum on the matter in 2004 with 12,000 signatures for it; however, the Constitutional Court of Slovenia rejected the petition on the grounds of freedom of religion. It was also controversial due to the financial crisis afflicting the country. At the ceremony, there was also a rare sight of women in headscarves.

== See also ==
- Demographics of Slovenia
- Slovenes
- Muslims (ethnicity)
