= Islam in Liechtenstein =

Islam in Europe by percentage of country population 95–100%: Azerbaijan; 90–95%: Turkey; Kosovo; 50–70%: Albania; Bosnia and Herzegovina; Kazakhstan; 30–35%: North Macedonia; 10–20%: France; Georgia; Montenegro; 5–10%: Austria; Bulgaria; Sweden; Belgium; Germany; Liechtenstein; Netherlands; Switzerland; United Kingdom; Denmark; Russia; Luxembourg; 4–5%: Serbia; 2–4%: Italy; Finland; Norway; Malta; Slovenia; Spain; Greece; Cyprus (Note: Only takes into account the Muslim population residing on land controlled by the Republic of Cyprus.); 1–2%: Croatia; Ireland; Ukraine; Andorra; < 1%: Iceland; Armenia; Belarus; Czech Republic; Estonia; Hungary; Latvia; Lithuania; Moldova; Monaco; Poland; Portugal; Romania; San Marino; Slovakia

Islam is the second most practiced religion in Liechtenstein after Christianity.

== Demographics ==
According to the census taken in 2000, there were an estimated 2,000 Muslims living in the country in 2009, approximately 4.8% of the general population. In the 2010 census, 5.4% of the population (1960 persons) were Muslims; the number rose to 5.9% in the 2015 census.

In 2020, Muslims constituted 6.27% of the population. According to the Pew Research Center, this number is projected to remain constant through 2030.

The great majority of Muslims in Liechtenstein are Sunni, and are predominantly from Turkey, Kosovo, Bosnia and Herzegovina, and North Macedonia. The census reports do not state the proportion of the Muslim population holding Liechtenstein citizenship.

== Overview ==
Since 2001, the government has granted the Muslim community a residency permit for one imam, and one short-term residency permit for an additional imam during Ramadan.

In 2006, the government contributed US$20,000 (25,000 Swiss francs) to the Muslim community.

== Mosques ==
The county has one mosque, the Green Mosque.

== Organizations ==
Currently there are two Islamic organizations in the country.

=== Islamic Community in the Principality of Liechtenstein ===
The Islamic Community in the Principality of Liechtenstein (German: Islamische Gemeinschaft des Fürstentum Liechtenstein) is affiliated to the Umbrella association of Islamic Communities in the East of Switzerland and the Principality of Liechtenstein (German: Dachverband islamischer Gemeinden der Ostschweiz und des Fürstentums Liechtenstein).

=== Liechtenstein Türk Birliği ===
The Liechtenstein Türk Birliği is affiliated with the Turkish Diyanet İşleri Başkanlığı. It runs the Green Mosque (Turkish: Yeşil Camii).

== See also ==
- Religion in Liechtenstein
- Turks in Liechtenstein
