= Islam in Switzerland =

Islam in Europe by percentage of country population 95–100%: Azerbaijan; 90–95%: Turkey; Kosovo; 50–70%: Albania; Bosnia and Herzegovina; Kazakhstan; 30–35%: North Macedonia; 10–20%: France; Sweden; Georgia; Montenegro; 5–10%: Austria; Belgium; Bulgaria; Denmark; Germany; Liechtenstein; Luxembourg; Netherlands; Russia; Switzerland; United Kingdom; Spain; Greece; 4–5%: Serbia; 2–4%: Italy; Finland; Norway; Malta; Slovenia; Cyprus (Note: Only takes into account the Muslim population residing on land controlled by the Republic of Cyprus.); 1–2%: Croatia; Ireland; Ukraine; Andorra; < 1%: Iceland; Armenia; Belarus; Czech Republic; Estonia; Hungary; Latvia; Lithuania; Moldova; Monaco; Poland; Portugal; Romania; San Marino; Slovakia

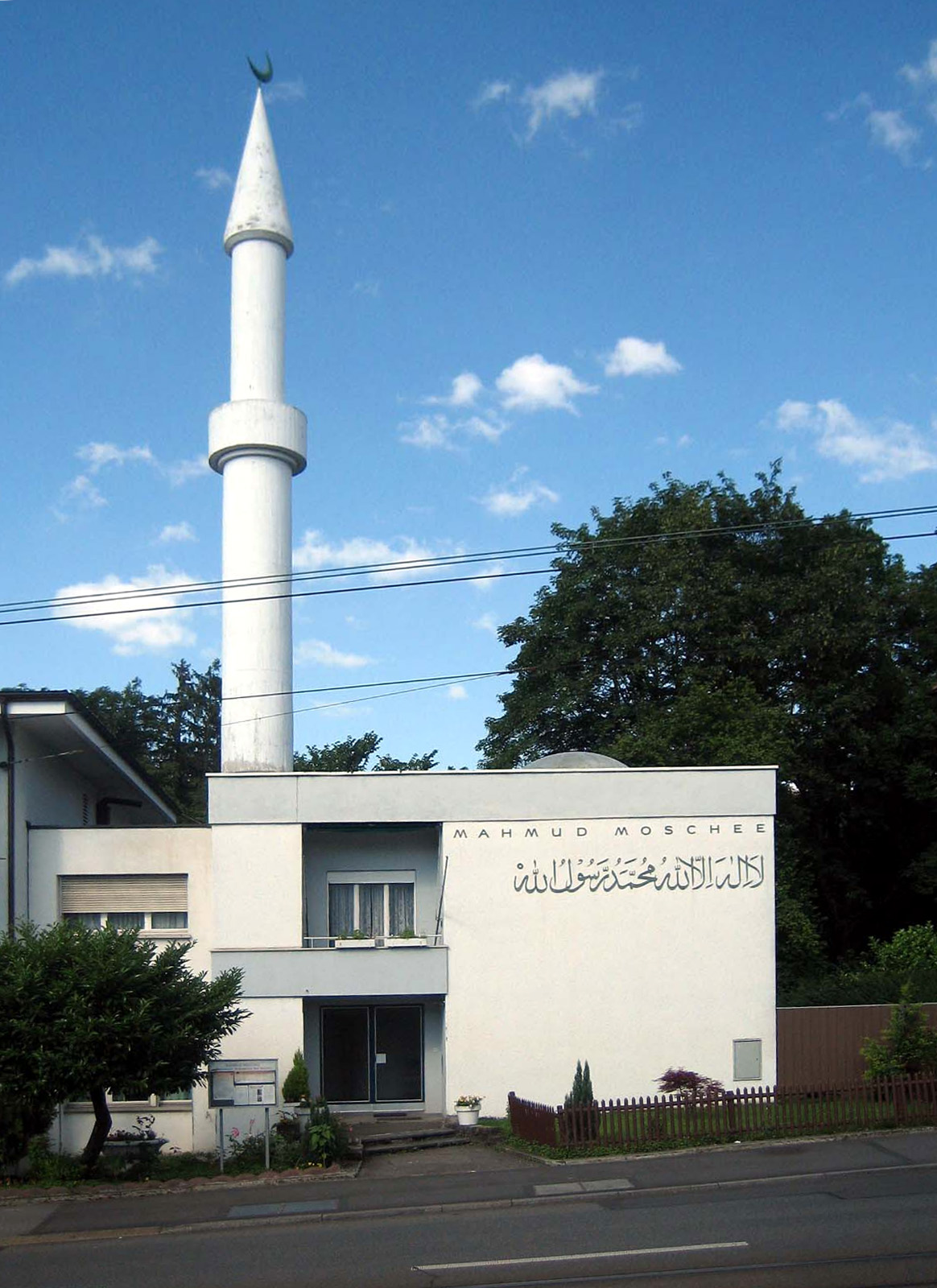
The Mahmood Mosque in Zürich (built in 1963).

Islam in Switzerland has mostly arrived via immigration since the late second millennium. Numbering below 1% of total population in 1980, the fraction of Muslims in the population of permanent residents in Switzerland has quintupled in thirty years, estimated at just above 5% as of 2013. The Turks and those from the Balkans (Bosnia-Herzegovina and Albania) make up the largest group. There is also a large North African community (most from Tunisia and Morocco) and a significant Middle Eastern community. This is because in the 1960s and 1970s, Switzerland encouraged young men from Yugoslavia, Turkey and Sri Lanka (many Muslims included) to come as guest workers. Initially these young men were only planning on staying in Switzerland temporarily, however revised Swiss immigration laws in the 1970s permitted family regrouping. Consequently, these men ended up staying in Switzerland as these new laws allowed the wives and children of these young men into the country. Since this time period, most of the Muslim immigration to Switzerland stems from asylum seekers arriving primarily from Eastern Europe. In more recent years, there has been migration from Turkey, the Balkans (mainly Albania, Kosovo and Bosnia and Herzegovina), Iraq, Syria, Morocco, Sri Lanka and Tunisia.

The vast majority of Muslims in Switzerland adhere to the Sunni Islam branch. Notable Swiss Muslims include Tariq Ramadan, Frithjof Schuon, Titus Burckhardt, Granit Xhaka, Xherdan Shaqiri and Isabelle Eberhardt.

== Demographics ==
As of 2019, the largest concentration of Muslim population is in the German-speaking Swiss Plateau. The cantons with more than 5% Muslim population are:

- 8.17% Basel-Stadt
- 7.72% Glarus
- 7.63% Solothurn
- 7.54% St. Gallen
- 7.14% Aargau
- 7.02% Schaffhausen
- 6.51% Thurgau
- 6.49% Zürich
- 6.24% Geneva
- 5.61% Basel-Landschaft
- 5.22% Vaud

Geneva is the only non-German-speaking canton where the Muslim population (6.24%) is slightly above the average (5.40%). Another remarkable demographic feature in comparison to other European countries is the relatively equal distribution throughout the country (compare Islam in the United Kingdom). No administrative unit has more than 8.55% of Muslim population, and no town or village more than 16.8%. The lowest percentage of Muslims in a canton is 1.82% (the Italian-speaking Ticino).

88.3% of Muslims in Switzerland are of immigrant background, 56.4% from former Yugoslavia (mostly Bosniaks, and Albanians from Kosovo), 20.2% from Turkey and 6% from Africa (3.4% from North Africa). 10,000 of the 400,000 Muslims are believed to be native Swiss converts.

== History ==
In the 10th century, Arabic-speaking Muslims were able to extert military influence into North Italy and the Western Alps from their Mediterranean Fraxinet base. They were able to take control of key mountain passes, such as Great St. Bernard Pass. They also raided up the Abbey of Saint Gall and Raetia in the east.

Islam was virtually absent from Switzerland until the 20th century. It appeared with the beginning of significant immigration to Europe, after World War II. A first mosque was built in Zürich in 1963 by the Ahmadiyya Muslim community. Muslim presence during the 1950s and 1960s was mostly due to the presence of international diplomats and rich Saudi tourists in Geneva.

Substantial Muslim immigration began in the 1970s, and accelerated dramatically over the 1980s to 1990s. In 1980, there were 56,600 Muslims in Switzerland (0.9% of total population). This ratio quintupled over the following thirty years, notably due to the immigration from Former Yugoslavia during the 1990s Yugoslav War. While the Muslim population continues to grow rapidly, the rate of growth has decreased after the early 1990s. The growth rate corresponded to a factor of 2.7 over the 1980s (10% per annum), a factor of 2.0 over the 1990s (7% p.a.), and a factor of about 1.6 over the 2000s (5% p.a.).

The burqa was outlawed in the canton of Ticino after a citizen initiative to hold a referendum. With 65% in favour of a ban and it was ruled that the ban was constitutional, the ban took effect in July 2016. Those who violate the law face a fine of up to CHF 10,000. One of the primary figures behind this burka ban is now attempting to ban Muslims from praying in public.

In September 2018, a ban on face-covering veils was approved with a 67% vote in favour in the canton of St Gallen.

In March 2021, a popular initiative for a national ban on face coverings was approved by a narrow majority of 51.2% of voters. Although the text does not explicitly mention Islam, the burqa or the niqab, the media and campaigners on both sides dubbed it the 'anti-burqa law', and the public was well aware that it targeted Muslims in particular. The ban, which came into force on 1 January 2025, contains numerous exemptions: it doesn't apply on aeroplanes, diplomatic premises or places of worship. In addition, face coverings remain allowed for reasons relating to health, safety, weather conditions, local customs, artistic performances or advertising.

== Organizations ==
Swiss Muslim organizations begin to form in the 1980s. An umbrella organization (GIOS, Gemeinschaft islamischer Organisationen der Schweiz) was formed in Zürich in 1989. Numerous organizations were formed during the 1990s to 2000s, including

- 1994 Organisation Muslime und Musliminnen der Schweiz
- 1995 Vereinigung Islamischer Organisationen Zürich (VIOZ), Zurich
- 1997 Basler Muslim Kommission, Basle
- 2000 Koordination Islamischer Organisationen Schweiz (KIOS), Berne
- 2002 Vereinigung islamischer Organisationen des Kantons Luzern (VIOKL), Lucerne
- 2003 Dachverband islamischer Gemeinden der Ostschweiz und des Fürstentums Liechtenstein
- 2006 Föderation Islamischer Dachorganisationen in der Schweiz (FIDS)
- 2009 Islamic Central Council of Switzerland (ICCS; German Islamischer Zentralrat Schweiz IZRS), Berne. IZRS is a comparatively minor organisation (with an estimated 960 members in 2010) but has a disproportionate media presence because of its radical Salafist orientation and because a disproportionate number of its members (an estimated 10%) are native Swiss converts.

== Mosques ==
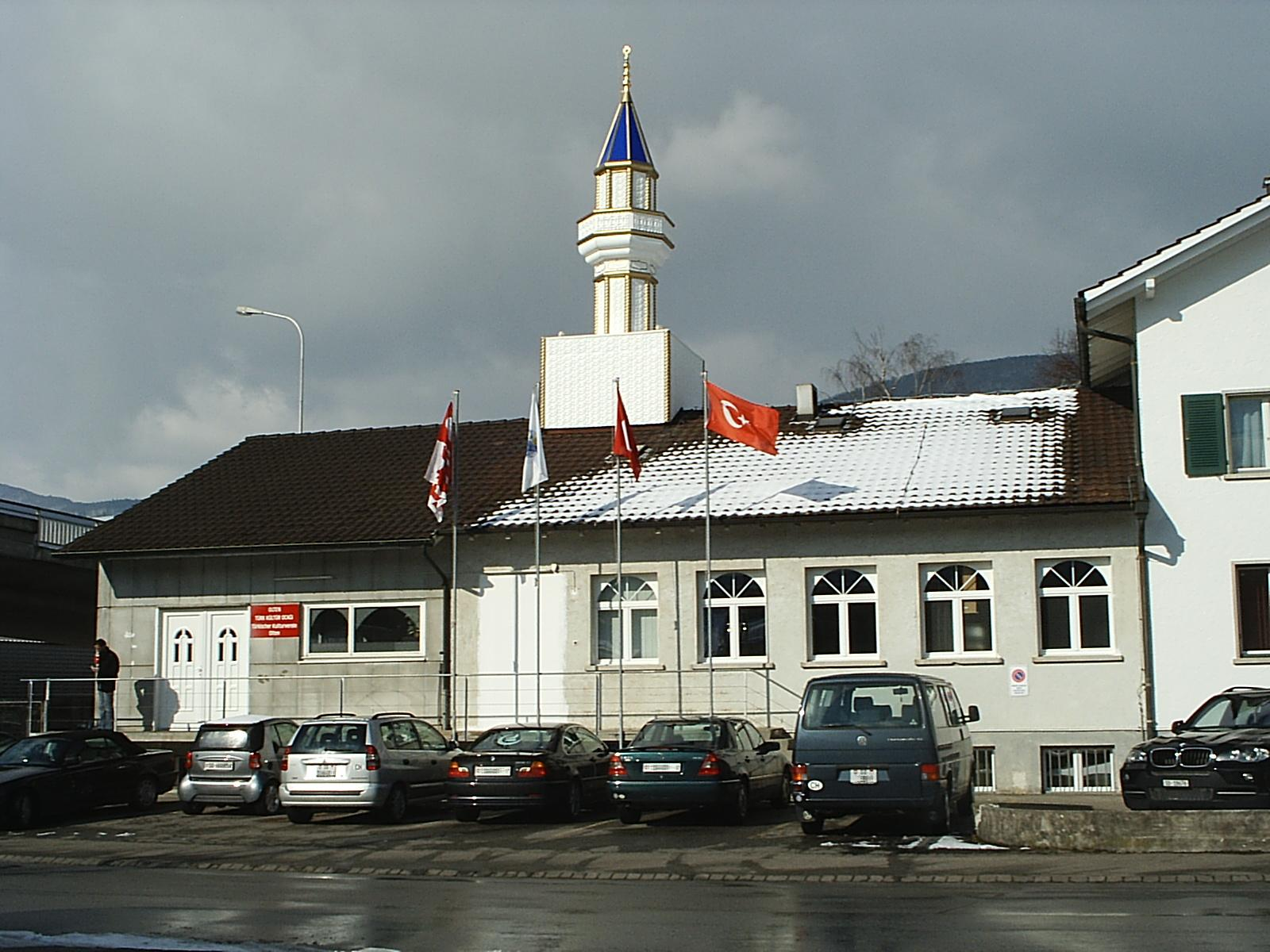
Mosque of the Turkish cultural association in Wangen bei Olten.

It is estimated that there are 260 mosques and prayer rooms with connected services in Switzerland. In comparison to the European average, Switzerland has the second lowest number of mosques per Muslim inhabitant, with about one mosque to every 4000 Muslims in Switzerland.

There are two Swiss mosques which predate 1980 and the rapid increase of immigration of Muslims from the Balkans, Turkey and the Middle East over the following decades. Today, there are numerous mosques and prayer rooms across the country, predominantly in the urban parts of the Swiss Plateau.

In 2007 the Bern city council rejected plans to build one of the largest Islamic cultural centers in Europe.

Four Swiss mosques have minarets, there is a mosque in Zurich, a mosque in Geneva, a mosque in Winterthur, a mosque in Wangen bei Olten. The latter was erected in 2009 following several years of political and legal disputes. In the wake of the Wangen minaret controversy, a popular initiative was passed with 57.5% of the popular vote in November 2009, introducing a ban on the construction of new minarets. The four existing minarets are not affected by the ban. Although the Swiss People's Party won the poll, the campaign was rocked by the conversion to Islam of Daniel Streich, a council member from the party. Streich left the SPP in opposition to their campaign against new minarets. The referendum also prompted concerns from other countries, with the perception that the Swiss electorate was increasingly shifting towards the right.

== Attitudes ==
In a 2018 survey conducted by Switzerland's Federal Statistics Office, 29% of Swiss respondents said they mistrusted Islam and 11% said they mistrusted Islamic followers. Comparatively, in 2016, 14% of Swiss respondents said that they mistrusted Islamic followers.

== Extremism ==
Jihadists are active in Switzerland, and the Federal Intelligence Service (FIS) judges them to be the primary risk of terrorism, mainly as isolated actors or small cells inspired by propaganda, rather than large-scale structures. Between 2001 and 2014, the FIS evaluated at 93 the number of Swiss residents who left the country with a motivation to commit jihad or who are in a conflict zone. In 2012, the first residents leaving for jihad in Syria were identified, but at the time the authorities did not communicate on the risk of terror attacks on Swiss soil. In 2016, following a preach at the An'Nur Mosque in Winterthur calling for violence on non-observant Muslims, an imam was imprisoned and expelled from Switzerland. Members of the mosque then physically attacked others for speaking to the press about this preach. In the 2020s, several knife attacks were committed by extremists: in Morges, Lugano, Zurich, and Winterthur.

== See also ==
- Religion in Switzerland
- Turks in Switzerland
- Arabs in Switzerland
- Ahmadiyya in Switzerland
