= Islam in the Czech Republic =

Islam in Europe by percentage of country population 95–100%: Azerbaijan; 90–95%: Turkey; Kosovo; 50–70%: Albania; Bosnia and Herzegovina; Kazakhstan; 30–35%: North Macedonia; 10–20%: France; Georgia; Montenegro; 5–10%: Austria; Bulgaria; Sweden; Belgium; Germany; Liechtenstein; Netherlands; Switzerland; United Kingdom; Denmark; Russia; Luxembourg; 4–5%: Serbia; 2–4%: Italy; Finland; Norway; Malta; Slovenia; Spain; Greece; Cyprus (Note: Only takes into account the Muslim population residing on land controlled by the Republic of Cyprus.); 1–2%: Croatia; Ireland; Ukraine; Andorra; < 1%: Iceland; Armenia; Belarus; Czech Republic; Estonia; Hungary; Latvia; Lithuania; Moldova; Monaco; Poland; Portugal; Romania; San Marino; Slovakia

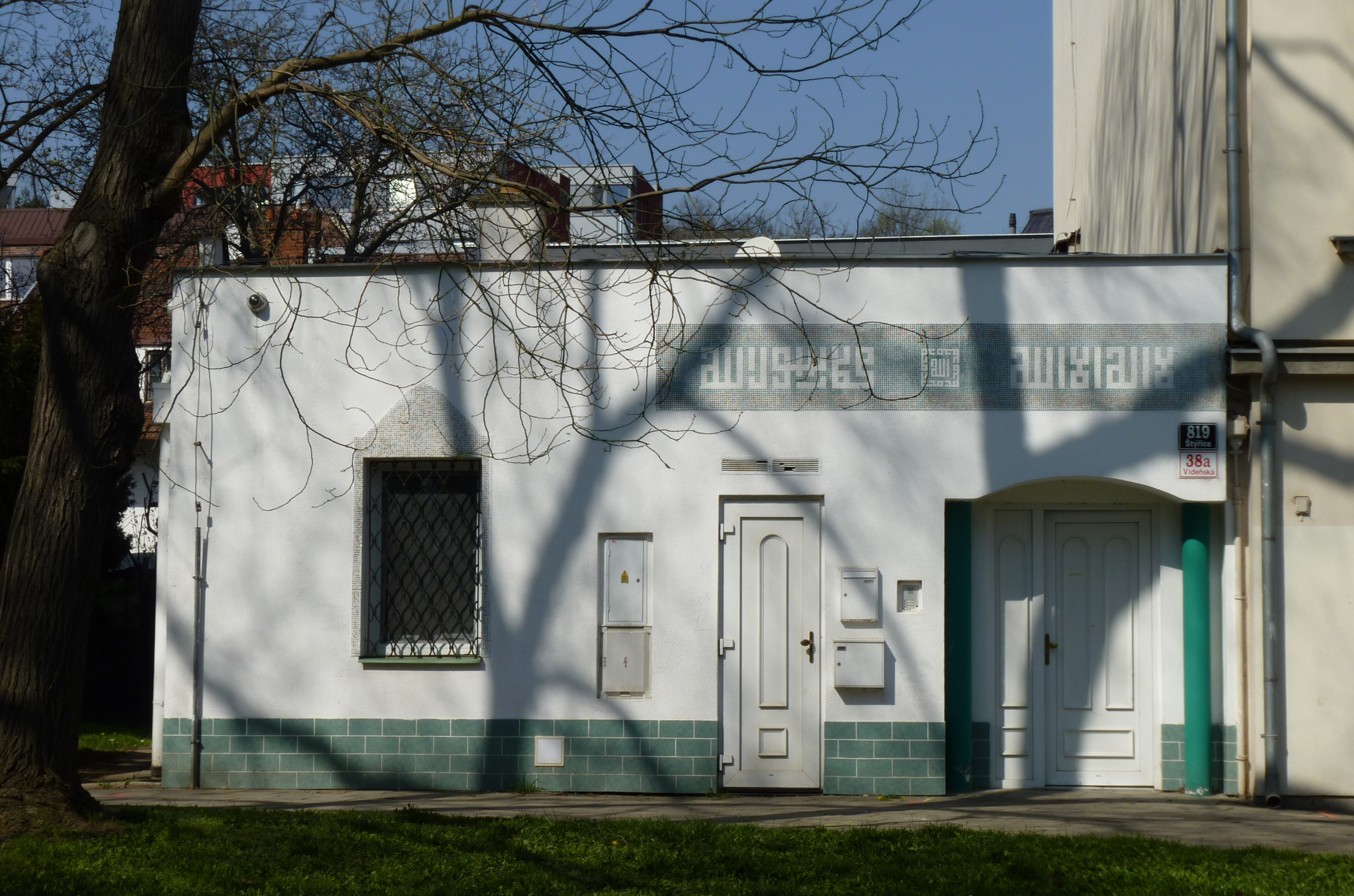
Brno Mosque in the Czech Republic

There are an estimated 20,000 Muslims in the Czech Republic, representing 0.2% of the country's population. The growing Turkish community form the largest Muslim population in the country.

According to the 2010 census, there are around 3500 Muslims in the Czech Republic (less than 0.1% of country's population), compared to 495 in 1991.

In the Czech Republic, there are three mosques in Prague, Brno and one mosque in Karlovy Vary.

== History ==
The first documented visit of a person with knowledge of Islam was made (964-965) by Íbrahím ibn Jaqúb, a Jewish convert to Islam from then-Muslim Spain. His memoirs were later published to become one of the first accounts about Central Europe in the Islamic world.

During both sieges of Vienna, reconnaissance war-parties of the advancing Ottoman armies reached Moravia. Strong trade links between Austria-Hungary and Ottoman Empire emerged during the 19th century. Individual Muslims from the late 19th century began to settle in Czech lands after Bosnia became part of the Austro-Hungarian empire.

Traditionally, the influence of Islam on the culture of Czech lands has been small.

=== Modern era ===
A law 1912 by the Austro-Hungarian monarchy recognised Islam as a "state religion" and officially allowed its presence in what is now the Czech Republic. The first community (Muslimské náboženské obce pro Československo) was established in 1934 and disbanded in 1949. An attempt to set up a new community in 1968 failed. In 1991, the Center of Muslim communities (Czech: Ústředí muslimských náboženských obcí) was established. In 1998 the first mosque was opened, in Brno and a year later another, in the capital, Prague . Attempts to open mosques in other cities have been stopped by local citizens. In 2004 Islam was officially registered in the Czech Republic: the community is thus eligible to obtain funds from the state.

The largest Muslim community are of Turkish origin. Other Muslims have also come from Bosnia-Herzegovina (early 1990s), Kosovo (late 1990s) and former countries of Soviet Union (mostly from Caucasus region, from the late 1990s until the present). A significant and influential part are the middle-class people of Egyptian, Syrian and other Middle Eastern ancestries (typically those who studied in Czechoslovakia and decided to stay). A few hundred Muslims are Czech converts.

== See also ==
- Turks in the Czech Republic
