= Islam in Lithuania =

Islam in Europe by percentage of country population 95–100%: Azerbaijan; 90–95%: Turkey; Kosovo; 50–70%: Albania; Bosnia and Herzegovina; Kazakhstan; 30–35%: North Macedonia; 10–20%: France; Sweden; Georgia; Montenegro; 5–10%: Austria; Belgium; Bulgaria; Denmark; Germany; Liechtenstein; Luxembourg; Netherlands; Russia; Switzerland; United Kingdom; Spain; Greece; 4–5%: Serbia; 2–4%: Italy; Finland; Norway; Malta; Slovenia; Cyprus (Note: Only takes into account the Muslim population residing on land controlled by the Republic of Cyprus.); 1–2%: Croatia; Ireland; Ukraine; Andorra; < 1%: Iceland; Armenia; Belarus; Czech Republic; Estonia; Hungary; Latvia; Lithuania; Moldova; Monaco; Poland; Portugal; Romania; San Marino; Slovakia

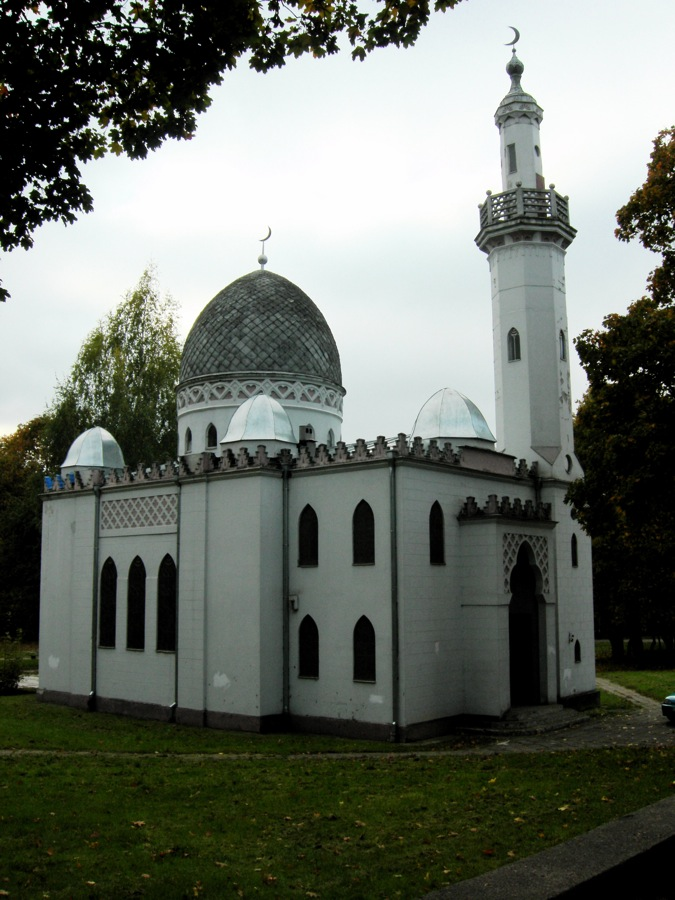
Kaunas Mosque.

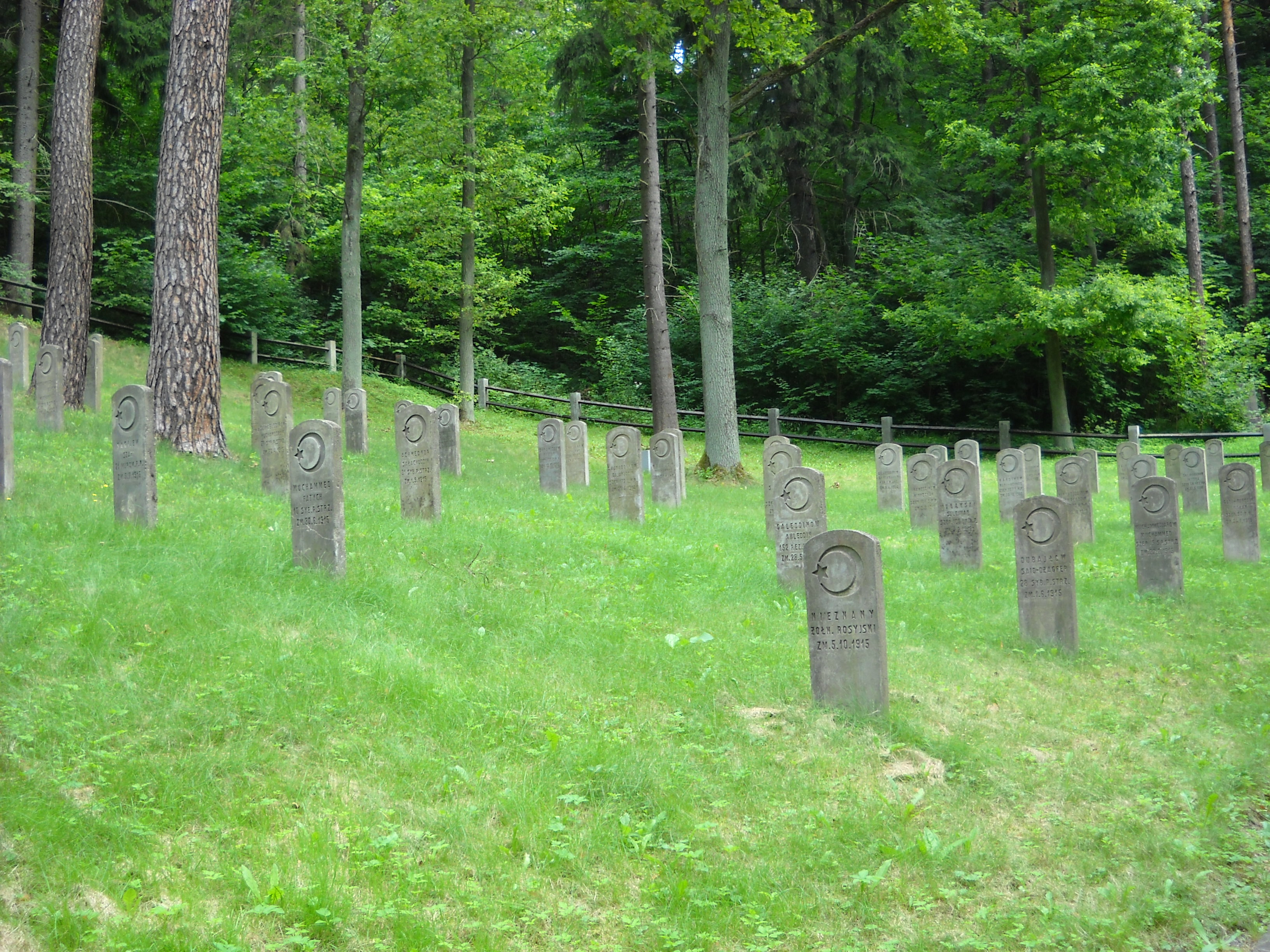
Graves in Antakalnis Cemetery of Muslim soldiers of Tsarist army who fought in World War I at Lithuanian soil

Islam in Lithuania has a long history starting from the 14th century. The medieval Grand Duchy of Lithuania, stretching from the Baltic to Black seas, included several Muslim lands in the south inhabited by Crimean Tatars. A few Muslims migrated to ethnically Lithuanian lands, now the current Republic of Lithuania, mainly during the rule of Grand Duke Vytautas (early 15th century). The Tatars, now referred to as Lithuanian Tatars, lost their language over time and now speak Lithuanian; however, they maintained Islam as their religion. Due to the long isolation from the greater Islamic world, the practices of the Lithuanian Tatars differ somewhat from the rest of Sunni Muslims; they are not considered a separate sect, however, although some of the Lithuanian Tatars practice what could be called Folk Islam. One anonymous Lithuanian Tatar who made Hajj to Mecca acknowledged in his work the risale that the Lithuanian Tatars had unorthodox customs and rituals such that they may be viewed as infidel (kafir) from the perspective of orthodox Muslims.

In Lithuania, unlike many other European societies at the time, there was religious freedom. Lithuanian Tatars settled in certain places, such as around Raižiai (in Alytus district municipality).

Much of the Lithuanian Tatar culture, mosques, graveyards and such were destroyed by the Soviet Union after it annexed Lithuania. After restoration of Lithuanian independence however the government supported the promotion of Lithuanian Tatar culture among those Lithuanian Tatars who lost it. Three original wooden mosques remain now (in villages of Nemėžis, Keturiasdešimt Totorių (both in Vilnius district municipality) and Raižiai (Alytus district municipality), typically having relatively large Muslim populations), as well as a new brick mosque built in Kaunas during the period of interwar independence of Lithuania (in the 1930s) to commemorate the anniversary of Vytautas, the duke who brought Tatars and Islam to Lithuania. That mosque is called Vytautas Didysis Mosque after the Grand Duke Vytautas. In the capital of Lithuania, Vilnius, however, no mosque remains, as Russians destroyed the Lukiškės Mosque which was there. The Lithuanian Tatar community is trying to rebuild the mosque, but faces various problems, including lack of funds as well as certain actions by the government of Vilnius city municipality.

Currently, only several thousand Lithuanian Tatars remain, making up an estimated 0.1% of the country's population; however, with the restoration of Lithuanian independence, they are experiencing a kind of national revival with evidence to suggest there are several hundred non-Tartar converts to Islam.

During the time of the Soviet Union, some people from other Muslim nationalities were moved in, however many of them were atheists; as well other Muslims came as immigrants after restoration of independence, but as for now this number is very small compared to similar numbers in western Europe; therefore Lithuanian Tatars remain the core of Islam in Lithuania, supported by some Lithuanians who converted. Halal meat in the country remains difficult to obtain, with more observant Muslims slaughtering animals themselves.

== Gallery ==
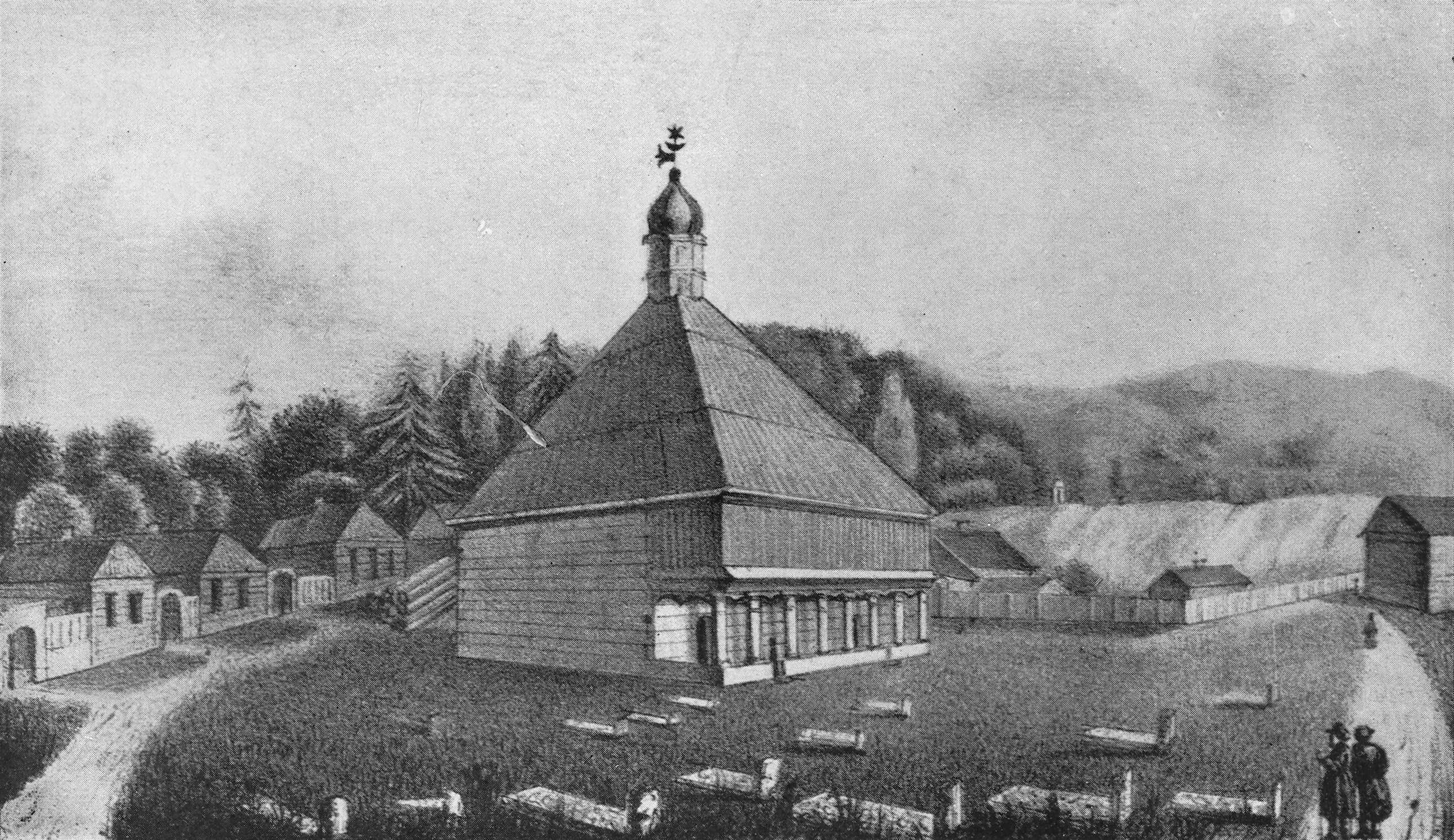
One of the earliest Muslim mosques in Lithuania.

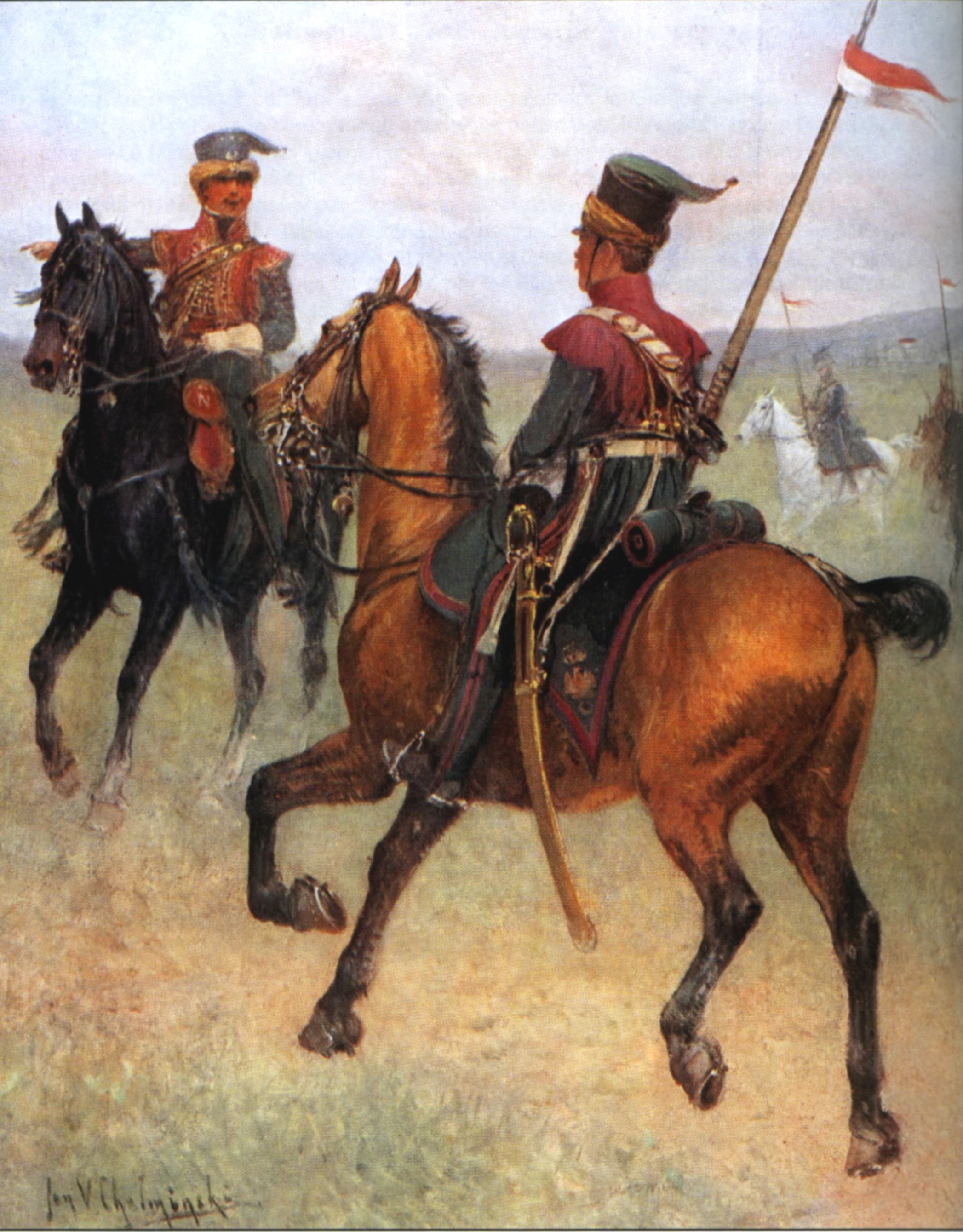
Lithuanian Tatars of Napoleonic army.

== See also ==
- Tatars in Lithuania
