= Islam in Andorra =

Islam in Europe by percentage of country population 95–100%: Azerbaijan; 90–95%: Turkey; Kosovo; 50–70%: Albania; Bosnia and Herzegovina; Kazakhstan; 30–35%: North Macedonia; 10–20%: France; Georgia; Montenegro; 5–10%: Austria; Bulgaria; Sweden; Belgium; Germany; Liechtenstein; Netherlands; Switzerland; United Kingdom; Denmark; Russia; Luxembourg; 4–5%: Serbia; 2–4%: Italy; Finland; Norway; Malta; Slovenia; Spain; Greece; Cyprus (Note: Only takes into account the Muslim population residing on land controlled by the Republic of Cyprus.); 1–2%: Croatia; Ireland; Ukraine; Andorra; < 1%: Iceland; Armenia; Belarus; Czech Republic; Estonia; Hungary; Latvia; Lithuania; Moldova; Monaco; Poland; Portugal; Romania; San Marino; Slovakia

Andorra is a Christian majority country, with Islam being a minority religion. According to the US Religious Freedom Report of 2006 there are about 2000 North Africans currently living in Andorra (out of a total population of 72,000) and they are the largest Muslim group in the country.

== Institutions ==
The Muslim community in Andorra has an Islamic Cultural Center which provides about 50 students with Arabic lessons. The government and the Muslim community have not yet agreed on a system which would enable the schools to give such lessons.

There is no specifically built mosque in Andorra and the government refuses to allocate land for such a project, saying there are not enough low-priced lands. In 2003 the local imam, Mohamed Raguig, petitioned Bishop Joan Martí Alanis asking for either land from the Church in order to build a mosque or for space inside a church to be used as a mosque.

== History ==
At around 700, the Muslims conquered the area from the Visigoths, through the Segre valley. The Muslims did not really stay in Andorra, rather using it as a shortcut to get to Toulouse, Narbonne, Carcassonne and Nîmes.

The Battle of Poitiers and the Battle of Roncesvalles marked the end of those expeditions to the other part of the Pyrenees.

According to Antoni Filter i Rossell in his history book the Manual Digest (1748), in 788, 5000 Andorrans, led by Marc Almugàver came to Charlemagne's assistance in the Vall de Carol in fighting the Muslims. After the battle, Charlemagne gave his protection to Andorra and declared them as a sovereign people.

== See also ==
- Islam
