= Islam in Portugal =

Islam in Europe by percentage of country population 95–100%: Azerbaijan; 90–95%: Turkey; Kosovo; 50–70%: Albania; Bosnia and Herzegovina; Kazakhstan; 30–35%: North Macedonia; 10–20%: France; Georgia; Montenegro; 5–10%: Austria; Belgium; Bulgaria; Denmark; Germany; Liechtenstein; Luxembourg; Netherlands; Russia; Sweden; Switzerland; United Kingdom; Spain; Greece; 4–5%: Serbia; 2–4%: Italy; Finland; Norway; Malta; Slovenia; Cyprus (Note: Only takes into account the Muslim population residing on land controlled by the Republic of Cyprus.); 1–2%: Croatia; Ireland; Ukraine; Andorra; < 1%: Iceland; Armenia; Belarus; Czech Republic; Estonia; Hungary; Latvia; Lithuania; Moldova; Monaco; Poland; Portugal; Romania; San Marino; Slovakia

Portugal is an overwhelmingly Christian majority country, with adherents of Islam being a small minority. According to the 2021 census, Muslims represent around 0.4% of the total population of the country. However, many centuries back, Islam was a major religion in the territory of modern-day Portugal, beginning with the Muslim conquest of the Iberian Peninsula. Today, due to the secular nature of the Constitution of Portugal, Muslims are free to convert, practice their religion, and build mosques. The Muslim community perceives itself as thoroughly integrated into Portugal and believes that the country provides conducive conditions for smooth integration.

According to the 1991 census recorded by Instituto Nacional de Estatística (the National Statistical Institute of Portugal), there were 9,134 Muslims in Portugal, about 0.09% of the total population. The majority of Muslims in the country are Sunni, followed by approximately 20,000 to 22,000 Shia Muslims, 65% of them are Ismaili. Most of the Muslim population in the 1990s originated from the former Portuguese overseas provinces of Portuguese Guinea and Portuguese Mozambique with most of the latter having their origin in former Portuguese India. The majority of the Muslims currently living in Portugal are from Mozambique and Guinea-Bissau, with the remaining population coming from the Maghreb, the Middle East (including Syria), and Bangladesh.

== History ==
Umayyad Iberian Peninsula at its greatest extent 719 AD

Caliphate of Córdoba c. 1000 AD, at the apogee of Almanzor

From 711 to 722, all the territory of what is now Portugal and then the Visigothic Kingdom was invaded by the Arabic Umayyad Caliphate and subsequent Moorish Sultanates of Arabic, Arabised and Berber people. By the year 1000, Islamic rule was still prevalent in much of what is now Portugal, namely south of the Mondego river, and later, for many more decades, across the Alentejo and Algarve regions of what is modern Portugal. During the period of Muslim rule, western Iberia was called Gharb Al-Andalus (the west of Al-Andalus). Over the course of Portuguese Reconquista the Christian military forces retook almost all of former Lusitania and the Muslim Arab and Berber military forces retreated to Algarve in the 1200s and were defeated during the course of the 13th century. However, their presence in Andalusia, a neighboring Spanish region, would stay strong for another 250 years. This presence has left some cultural heritage in Portugal, such as Islamic art and Arabic-inspired toponyms and words. The town of Mértola, in the Alentejo, possesses the only partial remains in the country of an early medieval mosque, changed and converted into a Catholic church (Church of Nossa Senhora da Anunciação) after the Reconquista.

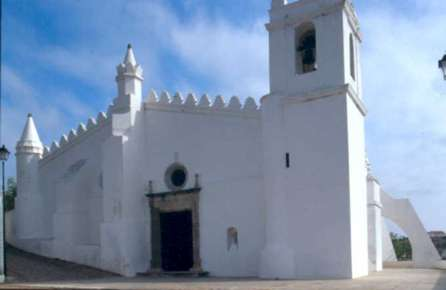
Old Mosque in Mértola, Alentejo region, converted into a Catholic church after the Reconquista

The Islamic Community of Lisbon was formed in March 1968 by a group of Muslim university students who, at the time, were studying in the Portuguese capital. But even before the constitution of the community, in 1966, a committee composed of ten elements (five Muslims and five Christians) asked the Lisbon City Council for a plot of land to build a mosque. The Community, in its beginning, was mostly made up of families from the ex-colonies that went to Portugal after the Carnation Revolution on 25 April 1974, namely Mozambique and Guinea-Bissau, as well as some people from North Africa (Morocco and Algeria), Pakistan, Bangladesh and members of the several embassies of Arab countries accredited in Portugal. Only later, in September 1977, a piece of land on Avenida José Malhoa was ceded.

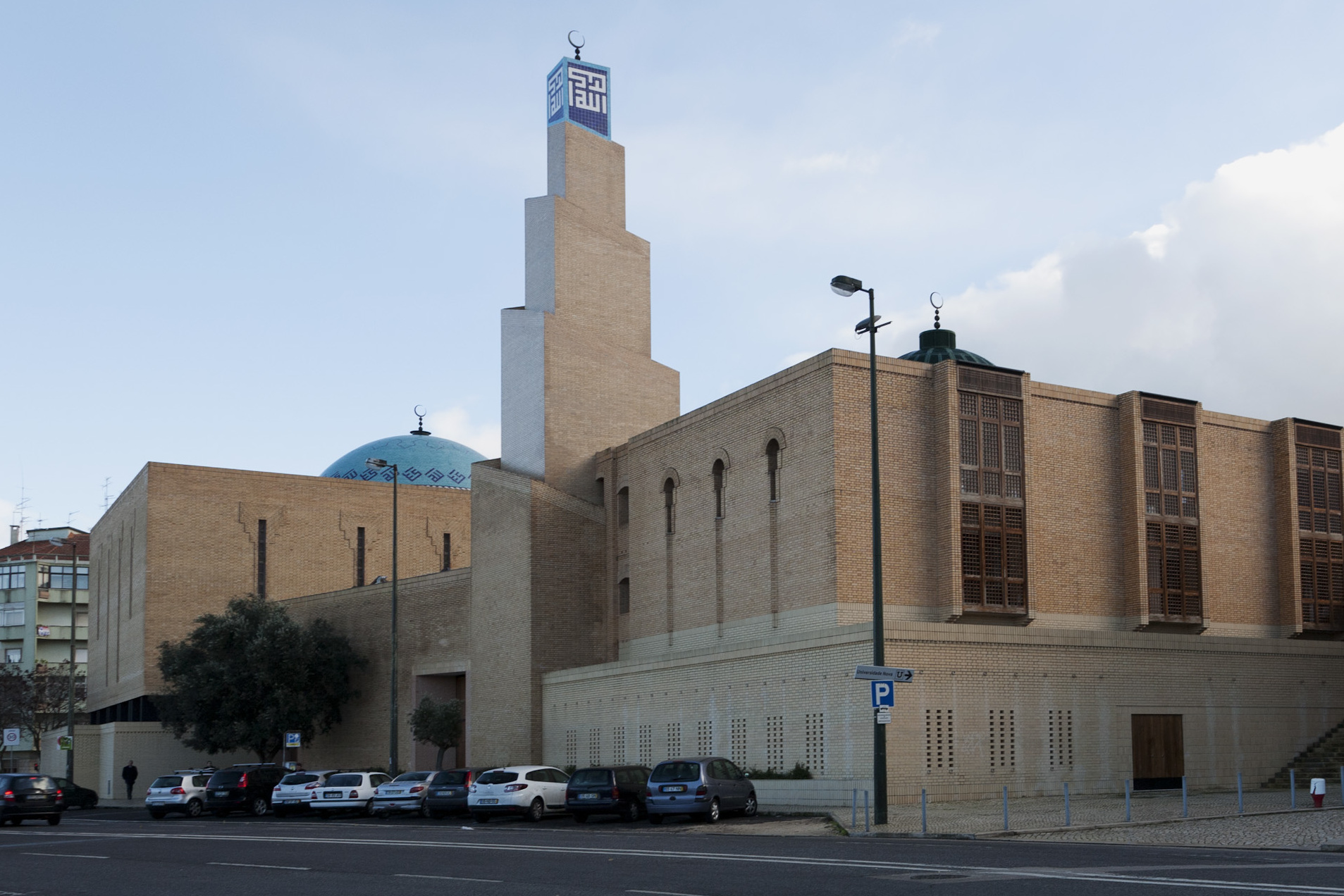
The Central Mosque of Lisbon

The laying of the first stone took place in January 1979 and the inauguration of the first phase of construction took place on 29 March 1985. By then, the community was already estimated at more than four thousand people (1981 Census), mostly from the former Portuguese colonies. According to the 1991 census recorded by Instituto Nacional de Estatística (the National Statistical Institute of Portugal), there were 9,134 Muslims in Portugal, about 0.1% of the total population. As of 2021, the community is estimated at 65 thousand people (many from the Maghreb and the Middle East, notably from Syria and Iraq, as well as from Afghanistan and Bangladesh among other countries) and spreads over several parts of Portugal, most prominently within the Lisbon Metropolitan Area, Porto Metropolitan Area, and Algarve.

On 17 October 2025 the parliament of Portugal approves a ban on face veils for "gender or religious" reasons and making it punishable by up to 2000 euros. The bill, promoted by right wing party Chega, is up for decision to President Marcelo Rebelo de Sousa, who can approve, veto, or refer the bill to the Constitutional Court for review. On August 19, 2026 it was reported that Portugal's president has enacted the law banning face coverings in public.

== Shia Imami Ismaili Muslims ==
The Aga Khan Development Network has been present in Portugal since 1983. Agreements were established between the Ismaili Imamat and Portugal, particularly the Protocol of Cooperation with the Portuguese Government signed in 2005 as well as the Protocol of International Cooperation with the Ministry of Foreign Affairs which was signed in 2008.

In 2015, Lisbon was chosen to be the global seat of the Nizari Isma'ili community, the second largest Shia denomination in the world. On 11 July 2018 the Aga Khan decided to move his global headquarters along with his official residence to Portugal. On 3 June 2015 Portugal's Minister of State and Foreign Affairs Rui Machete and His Highness the Aga Khan signed a landmark Agreement between the Republic of Portugal and the Ismaili Imamat for the establishment of a formal Seat of the Aga Khan in Portugal. The accord, which was approved by Portugal's Parliament and the President of Portugal, will result in intensified cooperation between Portugal and the Aga Khan Development Network in attempting to support research and the knowledge society as well as attempting to improve the quality of life of Portugal's inhabitants.

The Aga Khan recently acquired the Henrique de Mendonça Palace, a 12-million-euro estate he has renamed the "Diwan of the Ismaili Imamat", to take place as the new Global Headquarters and serve as an administrative structure to coordinate the Aga Khan Development Network. Rui Machete told the Portuguese daily national newspaper Público, “It is natural that an institution with an annual budget of between €600-€900 million will bring something to Portugal." The Aga Khan stated that he also has goals to, “plough money into health and social protection services in Portugal." The Aga Khan is followed by more than 15 million Muslims worldwide, of which 15,000 who live in Portugal.

The Aga Khan Development Network moving its headquarters to Lisbon, Portugal allows there to be a connection between Lisbon and the rest of the world in which the Aga Khan Development Network is affiliated. The international organization has many ties to Lisbon, not only because the Ismaili population is one of the biggest there, but also because most funding is coming from private sector partners which are located within Lisbon. Through various programs and initiatives, The Aga Khan Development Network is drastically changing the quality of life in Portugal in ways that are beneficial to people living there. The Aga Khan Development Network has been present in Portugal since 1983 focusing on research and innovative direct intervention in the areas of early childhood education, social exclusion and urban poverty. The activities in Portugal operate within the framework of the agreements established between the Aga Khan Development Network and the Protocol of Cooperation with the Portuguese Government.

== See also ==
- Central Mosque of Lisbon
- Aga Khan Development Network
- Aga Khan IV
- Islam in Europe
- Religion in Portugal
- Turkish diaspora
- Racism in Portugal#Muslims
