= Ismet Muftić =

Croatian Muslim mufti

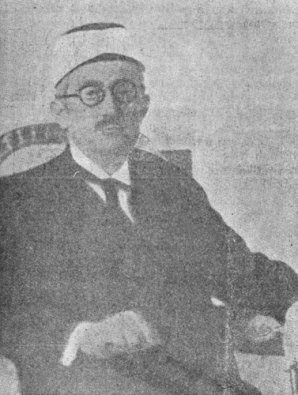

Ismet Muftić (born 1876, Žepče – died 1945, Zagreb) was a Bosnian imam and the first Islamic Mufti of Croatia.

He became mufti of the Croatian capital Zagreb in 1917 after the Islamic community was reformed there. His main task was to attempt to build a permanent mosque in the city. Due to lack of funds, the community was not able to achieve this on its own. Plans to build a mosque at Zelengaj in the 1930s did not succeed, however. In March 1939 Muftić was one of the founders and vice president of Društvo bosansko-hercegovačkih Hrvata u Zagrebu (Society of the Bosnian-Herzegovinian Croats in Zagreb).

However, after the Independent State of Croatia was formed, the ruling Ustaša party sought to better accommodate the Croatian Muslims. Muftić and the Muslim community put forth a proposition to turn the Orthodox church on Preradović Square into a mosque. In the end, it was decided that the Meštrović Pavilion would take that role. To that effect, three minarets were added to the building.

In 1945, at the end of the Second World War, Muftić was hanged by the Yugoslav Partisans. In 1949 the Pavilion's minarets were taken down, and the building returned to its old usage.
