= Islam in Slovakia =

Overview of Islam and Muslims in Slovakia

In 2021, 3,862 individuals self-identified as Muslims in Slovakia in the official census, though representatives of the local Muslim community estimate their numbers between 6,000 and 8,000, representing fewer than 0.1% to 0.15% of the country's total population. Slovakia is the only EU member state without a purpose-built, state-recognized mosque and without official state recognition of Islam as a registered religion.

Contrary to the popular belief that Islam was introduced to the region solely through the 16th-century Ottoman conquests, historical research demonstrates that Muslim communities have been present in the territory of present-day Slovakia across three distinct historical eras over more than a millennium.

== History ==
=== Medieval Hungarian Kingdom (10th–13th centuries) ===
The earliest recorded presence of Muslims in the territory of the medieval Kingdom of Hungary (which encompassed present-day Slovakia) dates back to the mid-10th century, six centuries before the Battle of Mohács. Medieval Latin sources refer to these early Muslim settlers as Saraceni, Izmaeliti (Ismaelites), or Busurmani (derived from the Turkic büsürman).

According to the 13th-century chronicle Gesta Hungarorum, Muslim noblemen named Bila and Bocsu arrived from Volga Bulgaria during the reign of Grand Prince Taksony (c. 955–971) and were granted lands across Hungary, as well as perpetual possession of the castle at Pest. In 965–966, the Andalusian Jewish traveler Ibrahim ibn Ya'qub noted that Muslim merchants from the "lands of the Turks" regularly traded in Prague alongside Slavic and Russian merchants. In the mid-12th century, the Andalusian scholar Abu Hamid al-Gharnati lived among Hungarian Muslims for several years, categorizing them into two distinct groups: those in royal service who practiced their faith covertly, and "free" Muslims who served in the royal cavalry during military campaigns and openly professed Islam.

Muslims played a prominent role in the financial administration and coinage of the Kingdom of Hungary during the 11th and 12th centuries. Non-Christian bankers operated interest-free credit and trade operations, and royal copper and silver coins minted under kings Stephen IV and Béla III featured pseudo-Kufic and Arabic inscriptions. However, anti-Muslim legislation was gradually enacted under King Ladislaus I (1077–1095) and King Coloman (1095–1116), enforcing mandatory baptism, forbidding circumcision and Islamic dietary practices, and compelling endogamous intermarriage with Christian families.

The political influence of Hungarian Muslims peaked prior to the Golden Bull of 1222, which explicitly banned Ismaelites and Jews from holding financial, minting, or tax-collecting offices (komorské úrady). By 1241, an estimated 210 Muslim-settled localities existed across the kingdom, comprising approximately 40,000 to 50,000 people (2–3% of the population). This medieval Muslim community was severely devastated by the Mongol invasion of 1241–1242, leading to their eventual assimilation or dispersal by the late 13th century. Traces of this medieval heritage survive in Slovak toponymy, such as the villages of Veľká Mača and Malá Mača (recorded in 1326 as Mached), derived from the Hungarian mecset (mosque).

=== Ottoman Period (16th–17th centuries) ===
Decades after the Hungarian defeat at Mohács (1526), Ottoman troops established direct military control over parts of southern central Slovakia starting in 1544 with the capture of Novohrad. Ottoman administration led to the creation of the Uyvar Eyalet centered in Nové Zámky in 1663. Ottoman authorities controlled towns such as Štúrovo (Párkány) and raided regions extending to Nitra. Following the Ottoman defeat at the Battle of Vienna (1683) and the collapse of Ottoman vassal Emeric Thököly's forces, Ottoman rule in Hungarian and Slovak lands ended between 1687 and 1699 under the Treaty of Karlowitz.

=== Modern Era and Migration ===
Following the Austro-Hungarian annexation of Bosnia and Herzegovina in 1878/1908, small numbers of Bosnian Muslims migrated to Slovak territory. In March 1916, the Hungarian Parliament officially recognized the Hanafi school of Islam as an accepted state religion. During the communist era in Czechoslovakia, university exchange programs brought international students from partner Muslim-majority nations (principally Syria, Palestine, Iraq, and Afghanistan) to study medicine and engineering. Many settled permanently, forming the core of the contemporary Muslim community alongside post-1989 refugees from the Yugoslav Wars and post-Soviet states.

In 2015, amid the European migrant crisis, Slovakia agreed to admit 200 Christian asylum seekers, but refused to accept Muslim refugees under an EU quota scheme. The Slovak Ministry of Interior justified this decision by citing the absence of official Muslim places of worship, asserting it would hinder integration. The EU criticized the policy as discriminatory.

Starting in 2022, industrial labor shortages prompted Slovak companies to recruit thousands of migrant workers from Central Asian nations (primarily Uzbekistan, Kazakhstan, and Kyrgyzstan) as well as South Asia (such as India and Bangladesh), contributing to demographic growth within the local Muslim worker population.

== Demographics ==
Official census figures regarding the Muslim population in Slovakia differ significantly from community estimates, partly because some individuals choose not to declare their religious affiliation, while others may be excluded from census counts due to the temporary nature of their residence in the country.

Year	Census respondents identifying as Muslim	Community / NGO Estimate	Primary Source
2001	1,212	~5,000	Statistical Office of SR / INS
2011	1,934	~4,000-5,000	2011 Census / Yearbooks
2021	3,862	~5,000–7,000	2021 Census / INS

The Muslim population in Slovakia is ethnically highly diverse. Major national backgrounds include Arabs (primarily Syrians, Palestinians, Iraqis, and North Africans), Albanians, Bosnians, Turks, Afghans, Central Asians (Uzbeks, Kazakhs, Kyrgyz), and South Asians. Additionally, the Islamic Foundation in Slovakia estimates there are approximately 500 indigenous Slovak converts to Islam, roughly 60% of whom are women.

Geographically, the largest concentration of Muslims lives in the capital city Bratislava, with smaller communities in Košice, Martin, Nitra, Trnava, Piešťany, and Levice.

== Legal Status and Religious Registration Laws ==
Under Slovak legislation, religious denominations must obtain official registration with the Ministry of Culture to enjoy institutional rights, such as performing state-recognized religious marriages, offering accredited religious education in public schools, providing imams for prison or military chaplaincy, receiving state subsidies, or building official places of worship.

Slovakia maintains one of the strictest systems of religious registration in Europe:

- 2007 Legislation: The Slovak Parliament passed an amendment to Act No. 308/1991 Coll. requiring a religious group to submit 20,000 signatures of members who are adult Slovak citizens with permanent residence (replacing the previous requirement of 20,000 sympathizers). Culture Minister Marek Maďarič stated in a 2016 TV debate that the law was specifically designed to prevent "Islamism".
- 2016 Amendment: In November 2016, Parliament passed legislation sponsored by the Slovak National Party (SNS) raising the registration threshold from 20,000 to 50,000 adult citizen members. President Andrej Kiska vetoed the bill, but Parliament overrode the veto in early 2017.

Because the local Muslim population is substantially smaller than 50,000, Islam remains legally unrecognized as a state religion. In 2022, the Slovak Public Defender of Rights (Ombudsperson) stated that the 50,000-adherent threshold was unreasonable and discriminatory; however, the Ministry of Culture declined to initiate legal reform.

== Representation in educational curriculum ==
In a didactic and historiographical study of Slovak history textbooks published from 1993 to 2020, historian Lukáš Rybár of Comenius University analyzed how Islam and Middle Eastern history are presented in elementary and secondary school curricula. The study identified several systemic factual inaccuracies, pedagogical shortcomings, and ideological biases:

- "Us vs. Them" Polarization: Secondary school textbooks frequently frame Islamic history through a dichotomous "conflict between East and West" or "Christianity against the Crescent," promoting an "us versus them" civilizational framing.
- Misinterpretation of Jihad: Textbooks routinely reduce the concept of jihad strictly to "holy war" (svätá vojna), omitting its broader spiritual, moral, and charitable meanings in Islamic jurisprudence, which fosters stereotypes of Islam as an inherently violent faith.
- Battle of Poitiers (732): Textbooks present the Battle of Poitiers through traditional 19th-century narratives claiming Charles Martel "saved Western Europe from Islamization," ignoring modern historiographical revisions (e.g., Franco Cardini, Alessandro Barbero) that view the engagement as a localized border raid rather than a decisive civilizational war.
- The Crusades: Textbooks emphasize cultural and economic exchange during the Crusades while understating the destruction caused to the Byzantine Empire (such as during the Fourth Crusade) and ignoring the fact that primary scientific and philosophical transfers occurred via Islamic Spain (Al-Andalus) and Sicily rather than crusader states.
- Arab Expansion: Early conquest accounts overemphasize force ("spreading Islam with sword and Quran"), contradicting modern historical evidence (e.g., Albert Hourani) showing low conversion rates (<10%) during the Umayyad Caliphate due to fiscal reliance on non-Muslim tax revenues (jizya).

== Islamophobia and political discourse ==
According to reports by the Islamic Foundation in Slovakia, anti-Muslim rhetoric became a prominent feature of Slovak political discourse during and after the 2015 European migrant crisis.

Several leading political figures have made explicit anti-Muslim statements:

- Former Prime Minister Robert Fico stated in media interviews that "Islam has no place in Slovakia," asserted that his government would monitor "every single Muslim," and publicly pledged to prevent the formation of a "compact Muslim community in Slovakia."
- Former Parliamentary Speaker Andrej Danko (SNS) repeatedly called for legal bans on mosques and minarets and pushed for stricter church registration laws to prevent the "Islamization" of the country.
- Far-right figures such as Milan Mazurek and Marian Kotleba (ĽS NS / Republika) have described Islam as a "satanic" or "inhuman" political system.

In public opinion surveys conducted by the Open Society Foundations and Network Media Service, approximately 55% to 70% of Slovak respondents expressed opposition to state recognition of Islam or the construction of Islamic cultural centers in their neighborhoods.

== Places of worship and community initiatives ==
Slovakia has seven unofficial Muslim places of worship (musallas or prayer rooms) operating in rented commercial spaces or residential apartments.

=== Cordoba Culture Center in Bratislava ===
The Cordoba Culture Center (Kultúrne Centrum Córdoba), located on Obchodná Street in Bratislava, was established in 2009 by the Islamic Foundation in Slovakia (led by Mohamad Safwan Hasna). Situated in a commercial area, it contains a prayer room (musalla) and a wooden podium used for Friday prayers (jumu'ah), with sermons delivered in Arabic, English, and Slovak. The center does not possess an official mosque permit and is not open for dawn (Fajr prayer) prayers.

=== Interfaith Outreach ===
Despite legal and political obstacles, the Islamic Foundation in Slovakia conducts interfaith activities, educational lectures, and community monitoring. Since 2015, the Foundation has hosted an annual ceremonial Ramadan iftar dinner. In 2025, the iftar was held in the Mirror Hall of the Primate's Palace in Bratislava, attended by Mayor Matúš Vallo, Bratislava Regional Governor Juraj Droba, the Apostolic Nuncio Archbishop Nicola Girasoli, and foreign diplomats.

== Gallery ==
"An Essay on Statements in Logic" by Safvet beg Bašagić (Collection of Islamic Manuscripts in the University Library of Bratislava).

Treatise on astronomy, surveying, and mathematics by Badruddin al-Maridini (died 1506); (Collection of Islamic Manuscripts in the University Library of Bratislava).

Ibrahim al-Halabi (died 1776) is about the sine, quadrant and

== See also ==
- Religion in Slovakia
