= Tomb of Gül Baba =

Tomb in Budapest, Hungary

Coordinates: 47°30′57.45″N 19°2′5.7″E

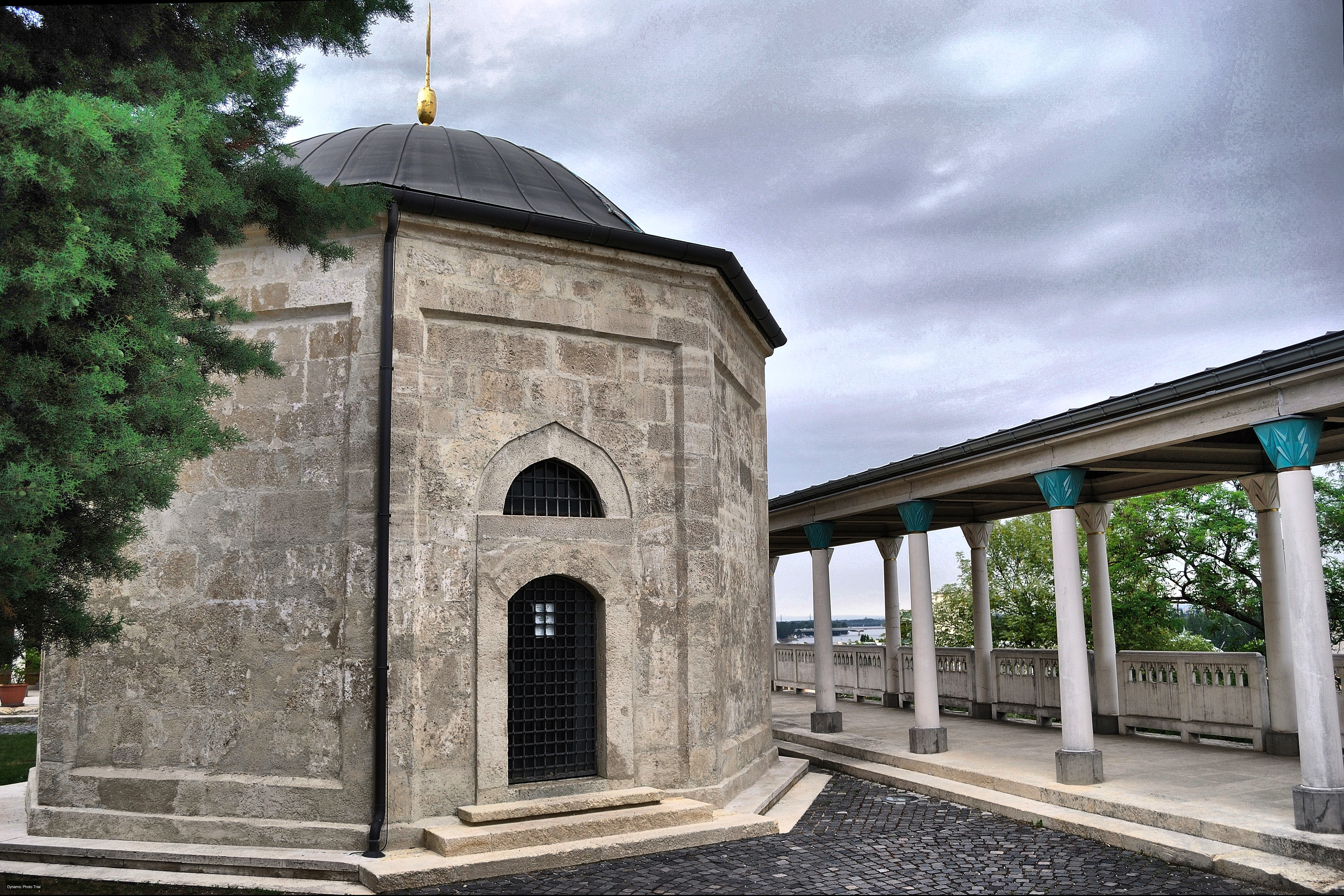
The tomb of Gül Baba

Gül Baba's tomb (türbe) in Budapest, Hungary, is the northernmost Islamic pilgrimage site in the world. The mausoleum is located in the district of Rózsadomb on Mecset (mosque) Street, a short but steep walk from Margaret Bridge.

Gül Baba was a member of the Bektás Dervish Order, who died in Ottoman Buda in 1541.

== History ==
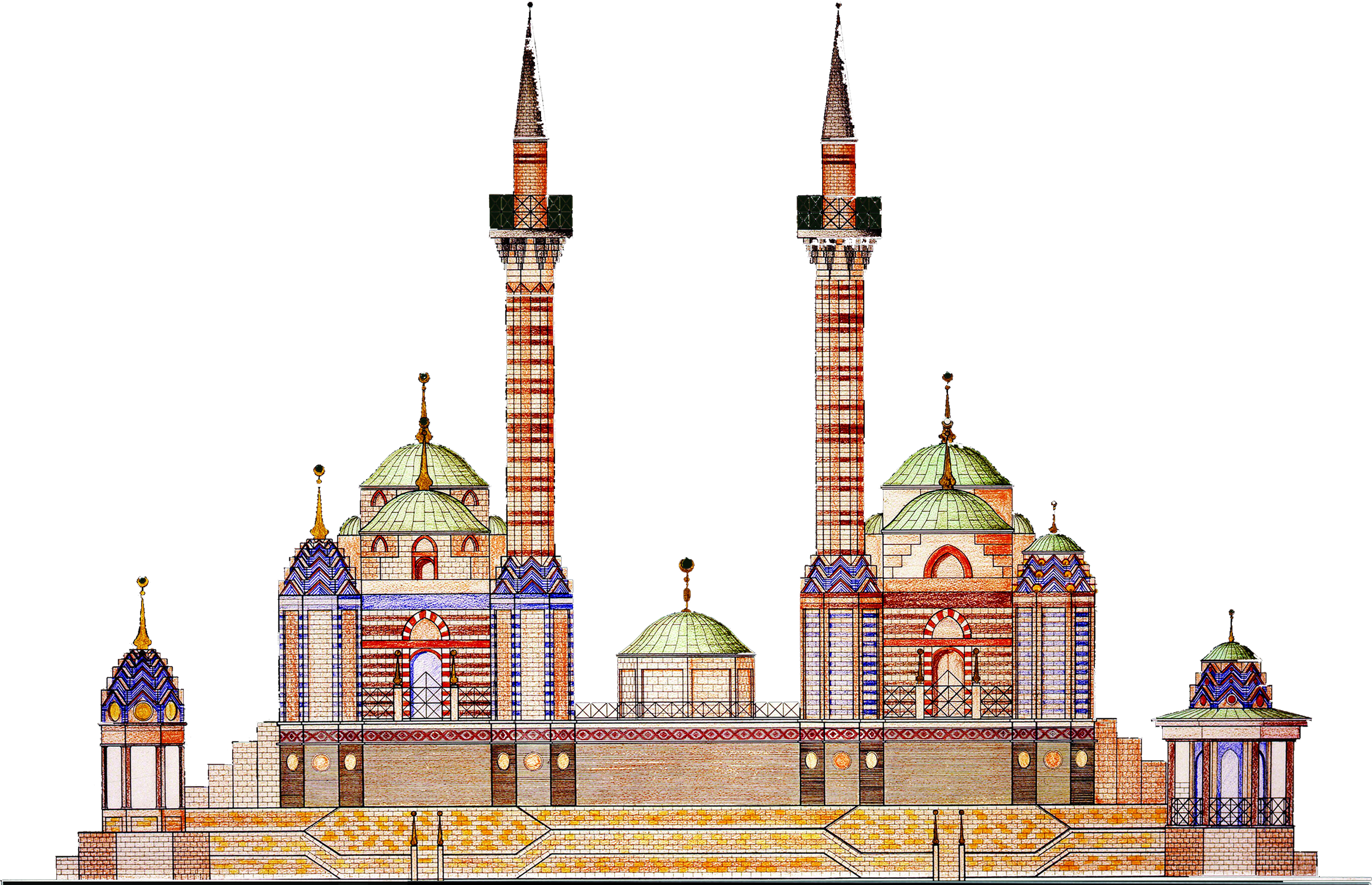
Plan for tomb of Gül Baba precinct, by Dr. Basil Al Bayati

Gül Baba, the author of Meftahū'l-Ghayb, was a Hurufi-Ostad of the Esoteric interpretation of the Quran. He died during the conquest of Buda, Hungary, by the Ottoman Sultan Suleiman the Magnificent. Gül Baba was declared to be the Wali (patron saint) of the city. His türbe was built by Mehmed Paşa, beylerbeyi of Buda, between 1543 and 1548 in an octagonal shape and has a shallow dome covered with lead plates and wooden tiles. The tomb became an important Ziyarat/pilgrimage place. Evliya Çelebi, the author of the Seyâhatnâme, reported that his Salat al-Janazah (funeral prayer) was attended by more than 200,000 Muslims. Various "Ayat-ū Mukattaat" from Qur'an are woven on the pall of his casket.

The tomb, in 1916, represented the farthest influence of Bektashism in the Austro-Hungarian Empire. While one source claims the only other türbe that remained in the former Ottoman lands north of the river Sava was the türbe of Mustafa Gaibi in Slavonia, transferred in 1954 to Bosnia, at least two other türbes are still extant: the Tomb of İdris Baba in Pécs, southern Hungary, and Damat Ali-Paša's Turbeh in Belgrade, between the confluence of the Sava with the Danube.

Gül Baba's tomb was not damaged when the Habsburg armies captured the area during the Second Battle of Buda in 1686, but it was converted into a Roman Catholic chapel by the Jesuits, who renamed it "St Joseph's Chapel".

In 1987, in the precinct of Gül Baba's tomb building, the Hungarian and Turkish governments decided to finance the building of an Islamic Centre and Mosque, complete with a library and museum, but after the political changes in 1989 nothing was built. One of the plans was designed by Dr. Basil Al Bayati and followed traditional Ottoman style.

"Dr. Bayati’s design presents a large complex which successfully combines the styles of Ottoman architecture (as it was practised in Eastern Europe) and Hungarian architecture in the style of Lechner. The platform on which this complex is envisaged is already standing. The new buildings flank the turbe to the right and left. The building to the left, or more precisely to the south of the turbe, is a mosque. This is covered by three domes, all resting on drums of various heights, that in the centre being taller than the lateral ones. Due to the cold climate of the country the mosque is entirely covered and is rectangular in shape. Since colour is very much in evidence both on the exterior and interior of the building, it is envisaged that the mihrab will be coated with Zsolnay tiles and framed by a rectangular border containing Quranic inscription.”

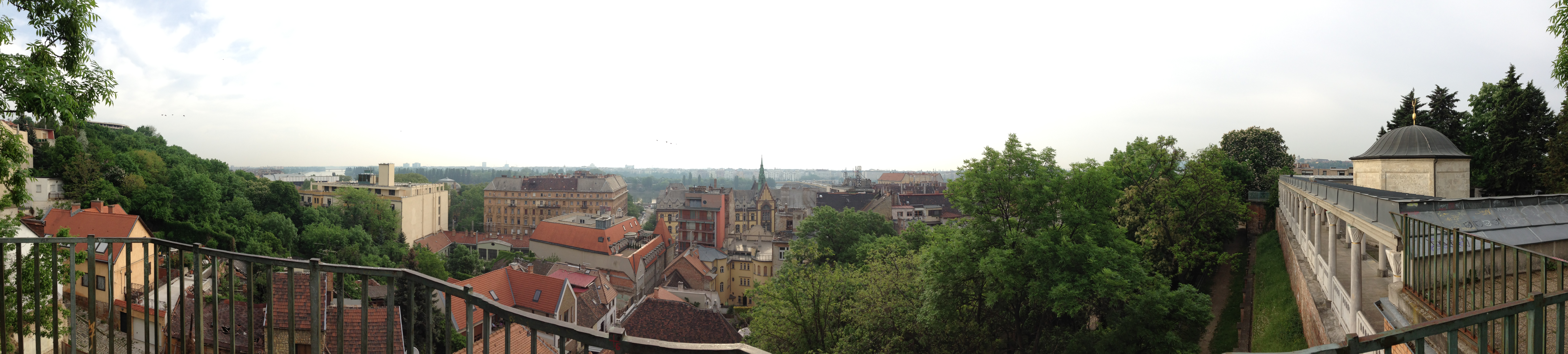
Panoramic view of the Rózsadomb district

== Ownership ==
The land later came under the ownership of János Wagner, who maintained the site and allowed access to Muslim pilgrims coming from the Ottoman Empire (see Islam in Hungary). In 1885, the Ottoman government commissioned a Hungarian engineer to restore the tomb and, when work was completed in 1914, it was declared a national monument. The site was restored again in the 1960s and ultimately in 2018.

== Gallery ==
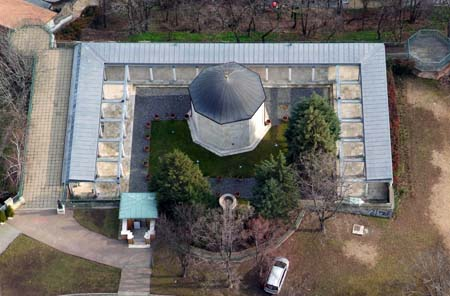
Aerial view of the building

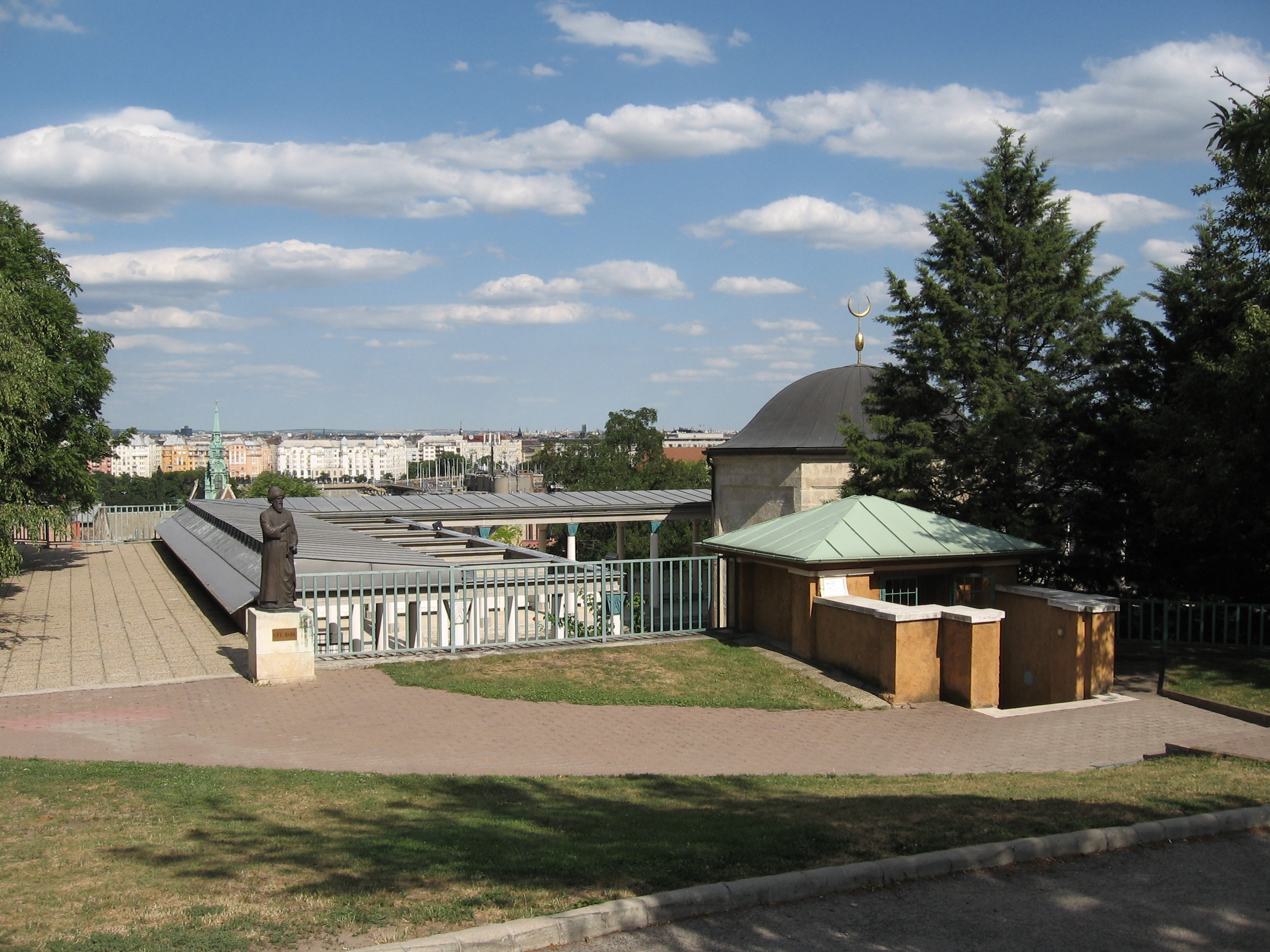
The exterior view of the türbe of Gül Baba

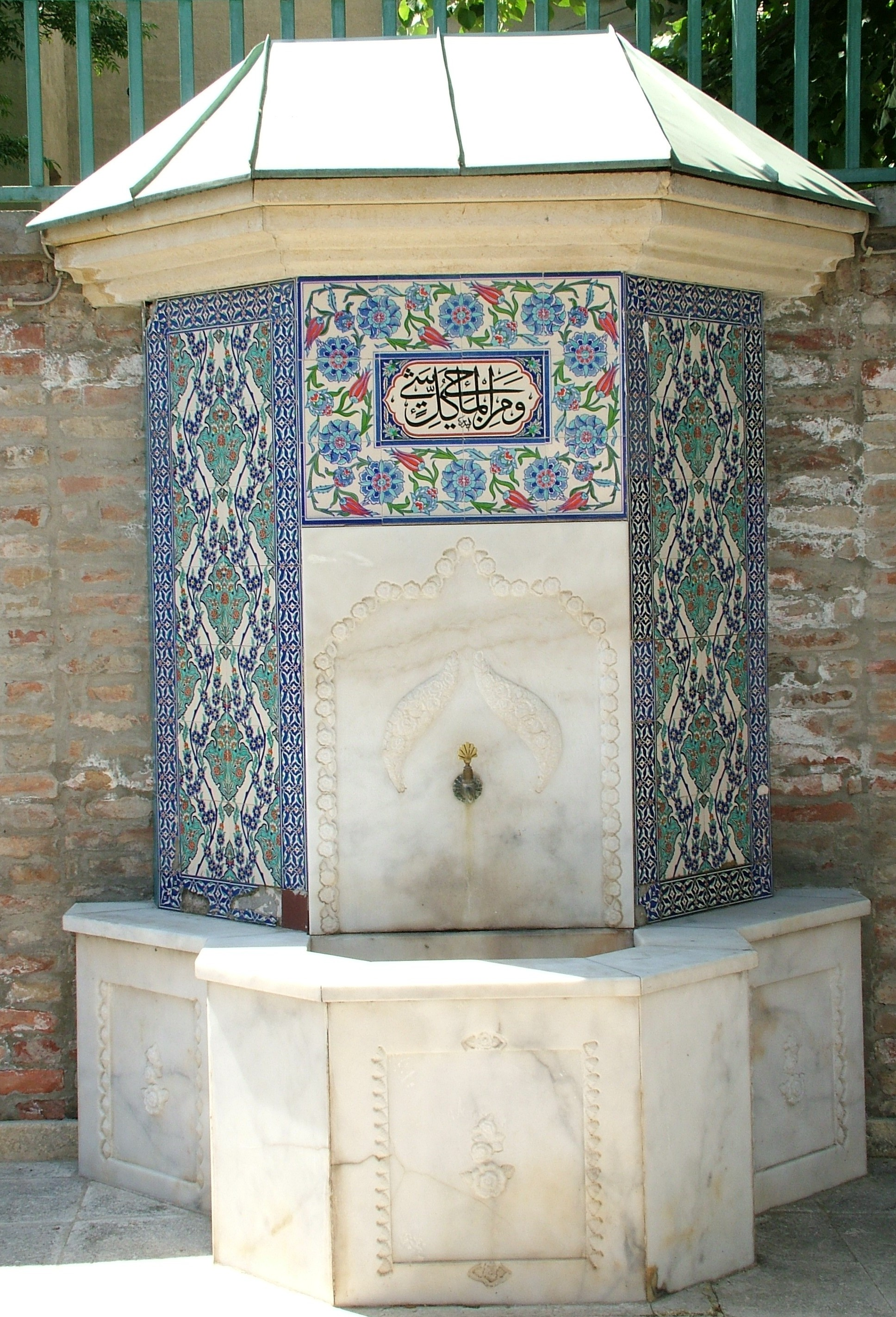
The sebil (fountain for ablutions and drinking) with the Arabic Qur'anic writing: وَمِنَ الْمَاءِ كُلَّ شَيْءٍ حَيٍّ

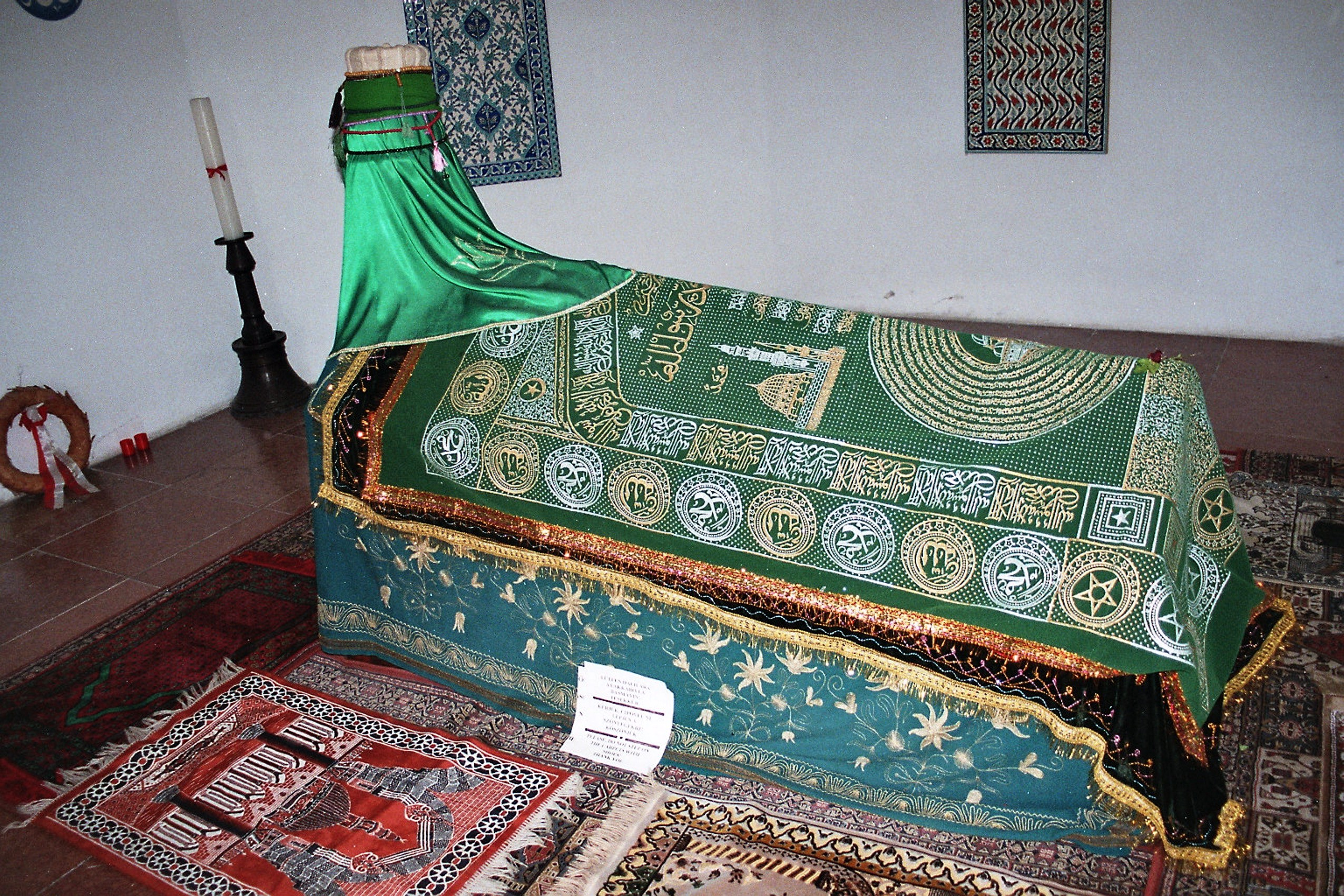
The interior view of the türbe of Gül Baba

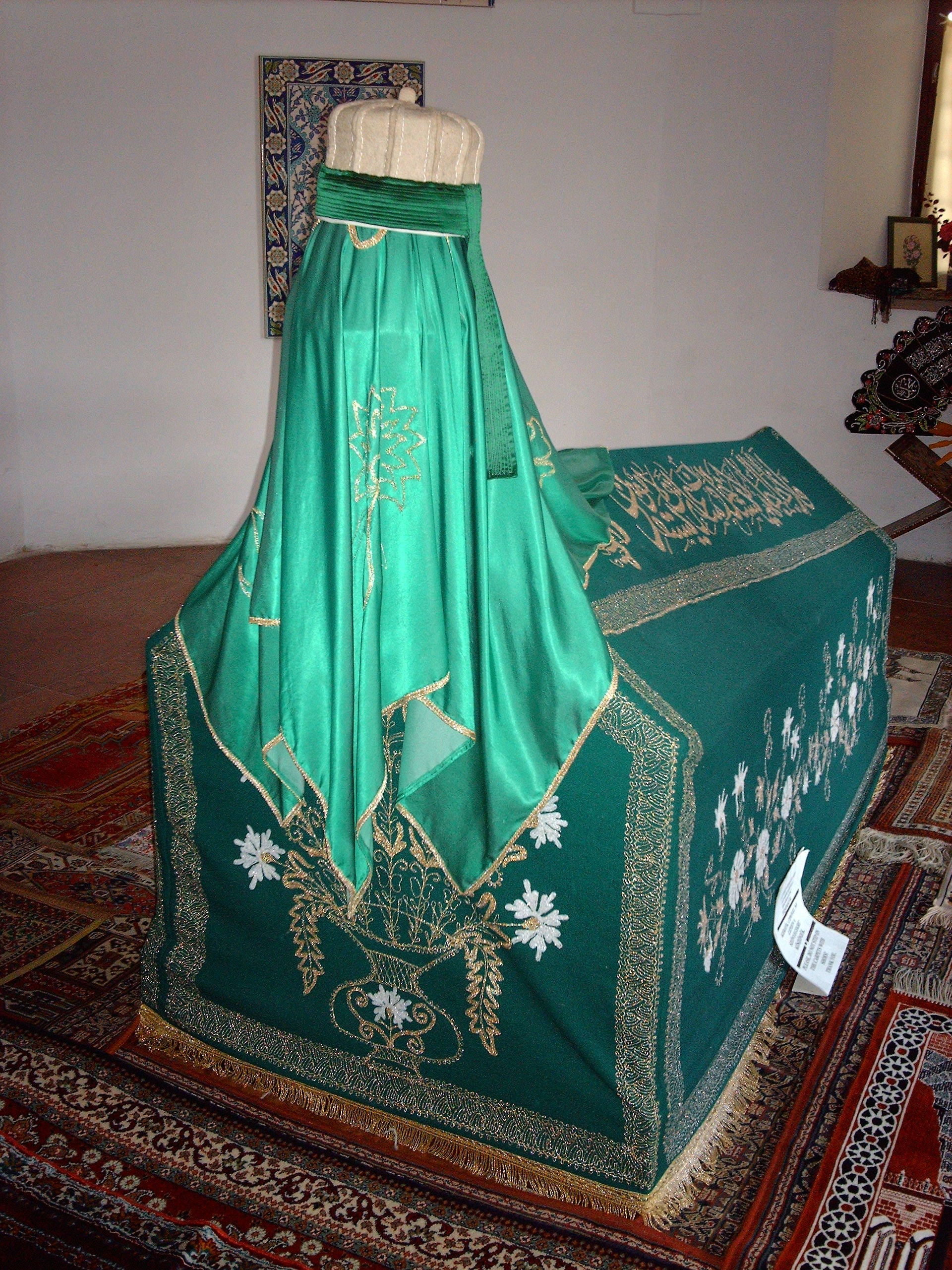
The coffin of Gül Baba

The ceramic glaze writings with the symmetric Islamic calligraphy on the wall of his türbe are seen: "Lā-ʾIlāha-illā'al-Lāh" at right, and "Muhammadū'n-Rasulū'l-Lāh" at left, in the picture above; and Allah-Basmala-Muhammad from right to left.

== See also ==
- Islam in Hungary
- List of mosques in Hungary
