= List of mosques in Hungary =

This article is for list of mosques in Hungary

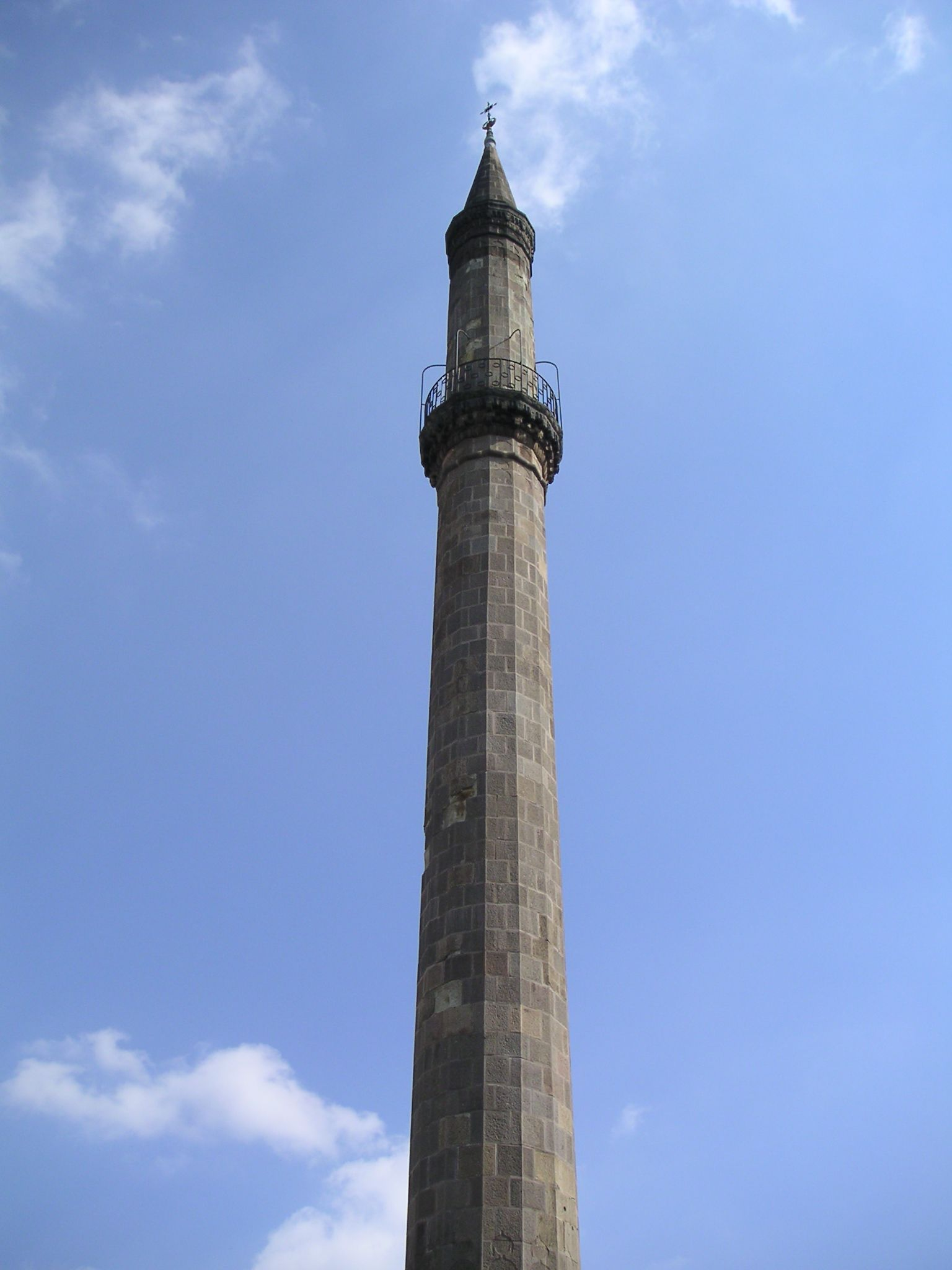
16th century Minaret of Eger

- Tomb of Gül Baba (Budapest) (only a tomb, doesn't serve as a mosque);
- Mosque of Pasha Qasim (Pécs) (converted to a Roman Catholic church);
- Yakovalı Hasan Paşa Mosque or Mosque of Pasha Jacowali Hassan (Pécs);
- Malkocs Bey Mosque (Siklós);
- Eger minaret (only the minaret remains. Minaret of the Djami of Kethuda mosque. Not in religious use anymore);
- Ozijeli Haji Ibrahim Mosque (Esztergom)(not in religious use);
- Budapest Mosque of the Hungarian Muslims' Church (Kelenföld, Budapest)
- Bem József - Murat pasa mecset Debrecen mosque owned by Magyar Iszlám Közösségmanaged now by Dawateislami Hungary
- Masjid Dar-us-szalam, Budapest oldest mosque of modern Hungary(Buda Side of Danube)
- Budapest Mosque (Big mosque) Managed by Magyarországi Muszlimok Egyháza
- Al-noor Mosque, Budapest (near Keleti station)
- Masjid Al Noor, Debrecen (near City Centre)
- Al-Huda Mosque, Budapest managed by Magyarországi Muszlimok Egyháza (near Blaha Lujza ter).
- Altaqwa Mosque, Budapest (Turkish mosque)

== See also ==
- Islam in Hungary
- Religion in Hungary
