= Rózsadomb =

Rose Hill Rózsadomb
- Neighbourhood
- Location of Rózsadomb in Budapest
- Coordinates: 47°31′02″N 19°01′39″E
- Country: Hungary
- Region: Central Hungary
- City: Budapest
- District: 2nd district

The area known as Rózsadomb (German: Rosenhügel, lit. 'Rose Hill') is a wealthy area in the 2nd district of Budapest, the capital of Hungary. It is a member of the Buda Hills.

== Background ==
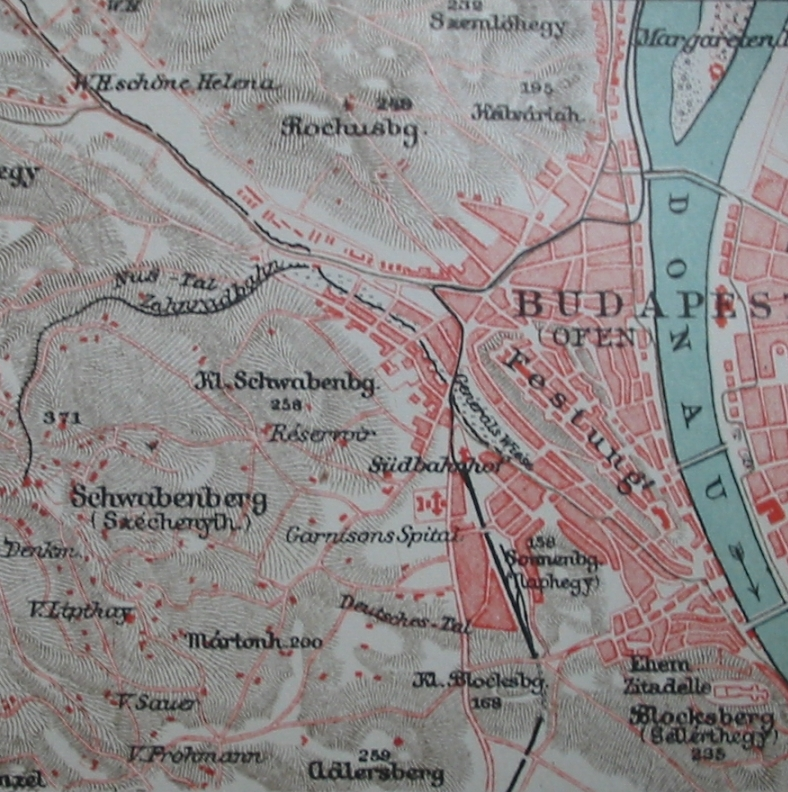
Budapest 1905, the development of the neighbourhood Rózsadomb started years later, about 1910

Rózsadomb is part of the 2nd district of Budapest, in the Buda Hills, one of the most prestigious areas in Hungary. Most of the city's wealthiest and most famous residents live here (e.g. former prime minister Gordon Bajnai). House prices are amongst the highest in Hungary. The area has easy access to local parks and the forests and hills around the Buda area, while also reasonably near the downtown area. Although it is mostly covered with exclusive villas, many old, dilapidated buildings can also be found here, remaining from the pre-war era.

Although Rózsadomb officially refers only to a relatively small part of the city, in broader sense other hilly and prominent parts of the 2nd district such as Vérhalom, Zöldmál, Rézmál, Csatárka, Szemlőhegy, Törökvész, Felhévíz or Nyék are very often treated as parts of the Rózsadomb, whereas Pasarét (a luxurious but flat part of the district directly next to Rózsadomb) is treated differently.

During the Turkish occupation of Hungary, most of the Turks lived in this neighbourhood. There are many urban myths about them planting roses on these hills. There are several Turkish related sights on Rose Hill, including the Turbe (tomb) of the famous Bektash dervish and poet, Gül Baba in Mecset street. This monument in Budapest was handed back to Turkey after some lobbying by the orientalist Gyula Germanus in the 1960s.

== Gallery ==
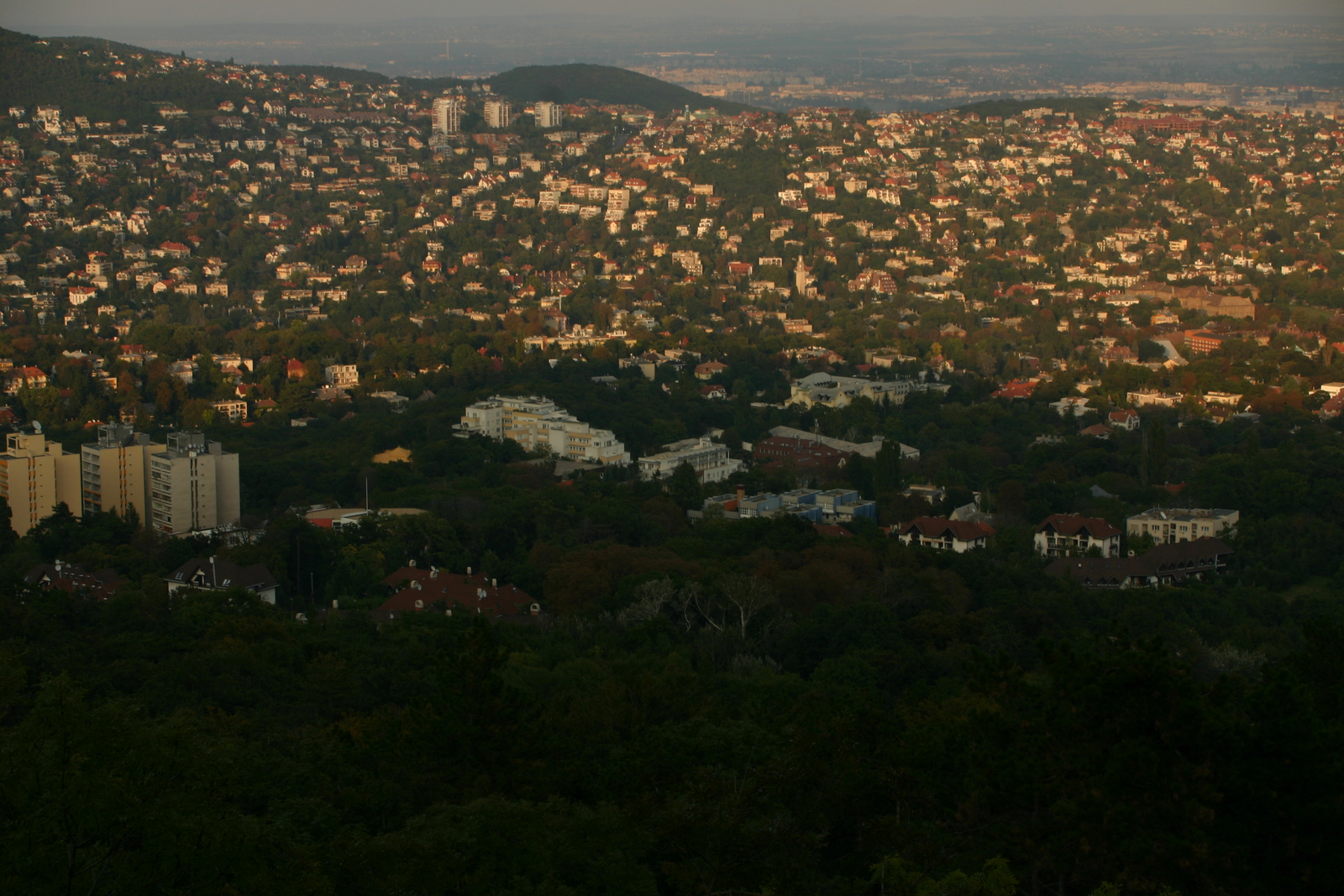

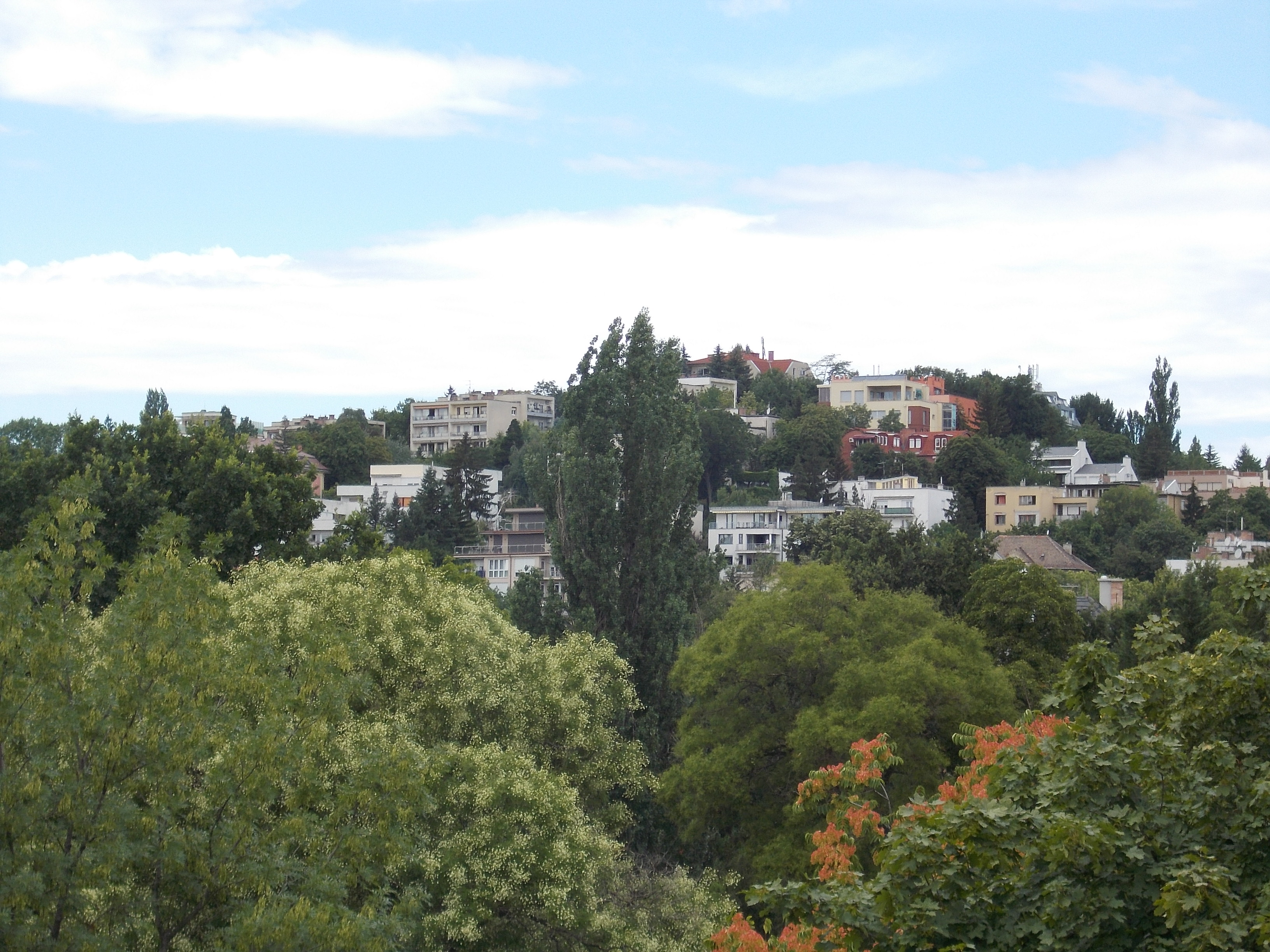

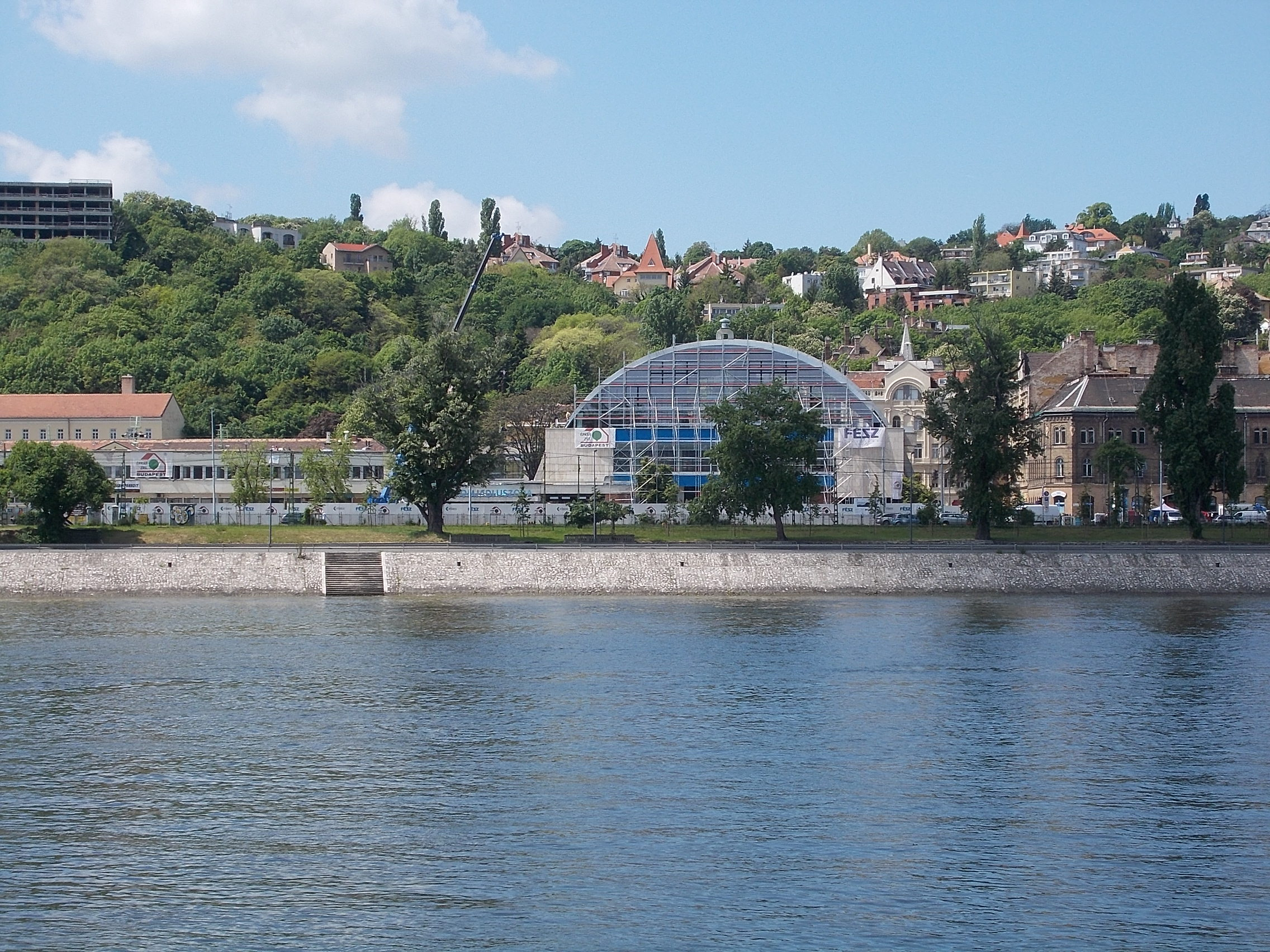

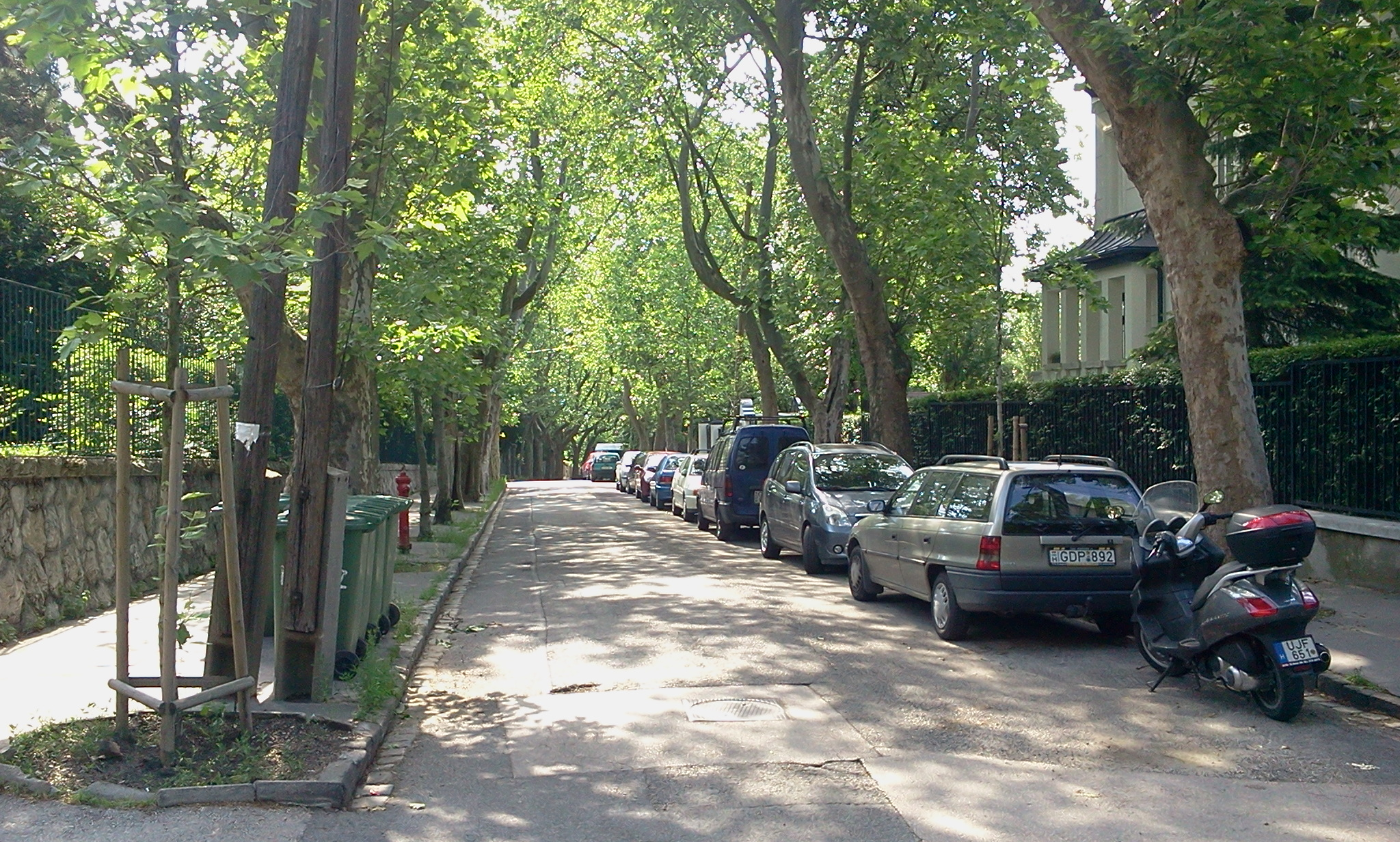
