= Gül Baba =

Ottoman poet and mystic (died 1541)

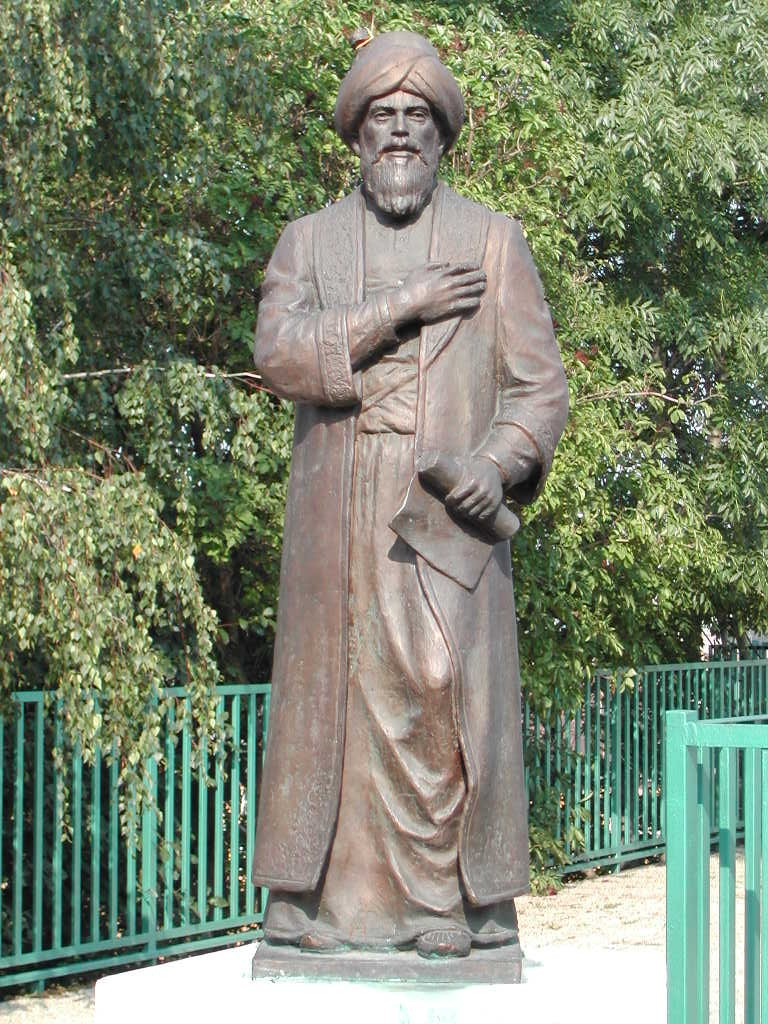
- Statue of Gül Baba in front of his türbe (mausoleum) in Budapest District II
- Born: Merzifon (Ottoman Empire)
- Died: 1541; Buda (Ottoman Empire)

Gül Baba (died 1541), also known as Jafer, was an Ottoman Bektashi dervish poet and companion of Sultan Suleiman I (r. 1520–1566) who took part in a number of campaigns in Europe from the reign of Mehmed II onwards.

== Biography ==
A native of Merzifon (Marsiwān, in the vilāyet of Sivas, Anatolia), he was the son of Kutb’ül Arifin Veli’üddin İbn Yalınkılıç. In Hungary, Gül Baba is known as the "Father of Roses," a literal translation of the meaning of his name in Turkish; he is said to have introduced the flower to the country. However, this is likely a misunderstanding of the metaphorical meaning of the Turkish name, which referred to the dervish's status derived from his deep mystical knowledge of Allah. Roses, wild and domesticated, were already in Hungary by the time of the Ottoman invasion. The name could also be a corruption of Kel Baba, meaning "Bald Father".

Gül Baba is thought to have died in Buda during the first Muslim religious ceremony held after the Ottoman victory of 1541, or alternatively to have been killed during fighting below the walls of the city on August 21, 1541. Suleiman, who was also Caliph, declared him patron saint of the city and is reputed to have been one of the coffin bearers. Gül Baba's descendants are the Marzioglu family, some of whom were the pashas of the Trebizond Vilayet.

== Tomb ==
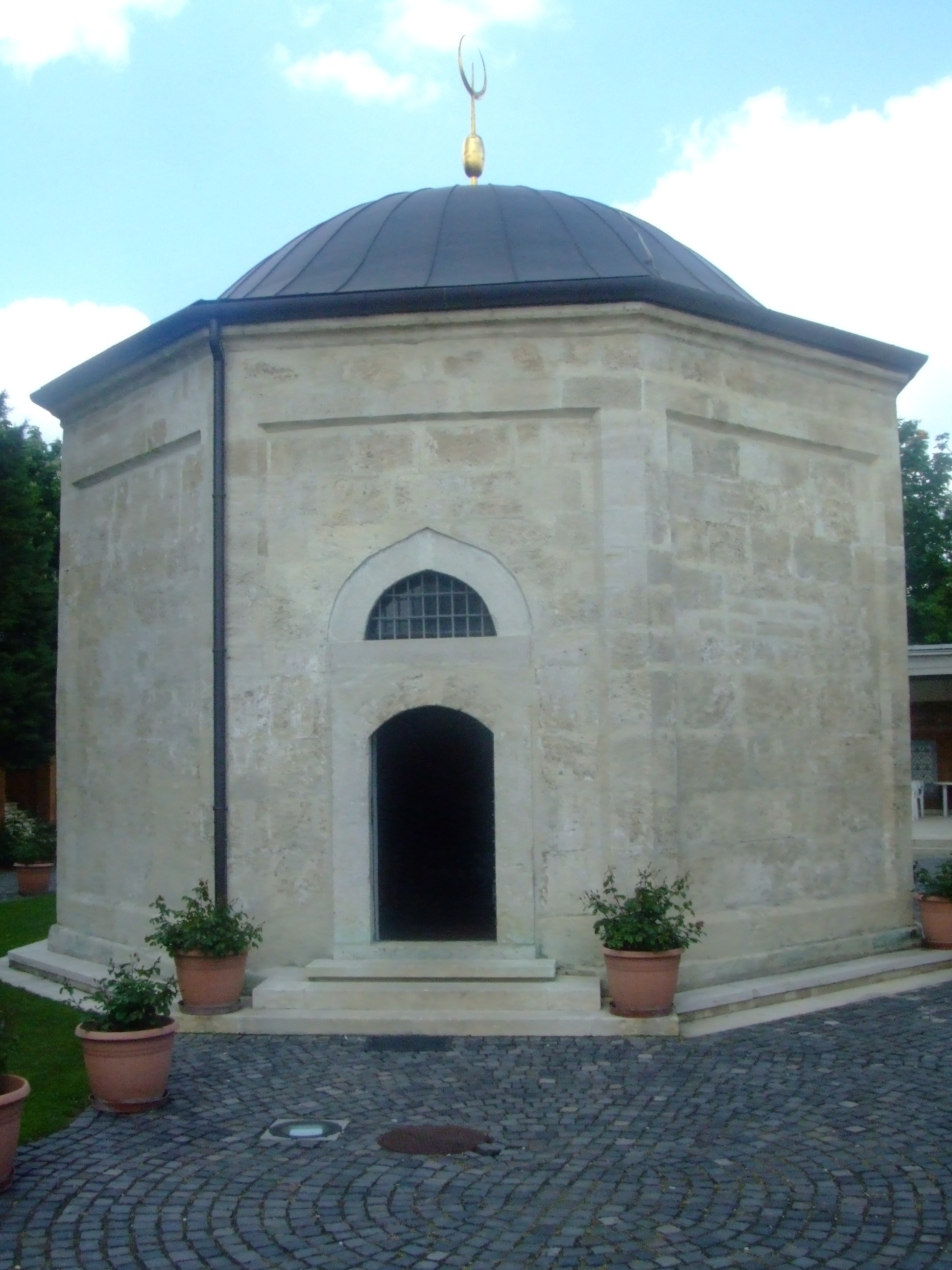
The tomb of Gül Baba in Budapest

Gül Baba's octagonal tomb (türbe) is located on Mecset (mosque) Street, Budapest, a short but steep walk from the Margaret Bridge in the district of Rózsadomb. It was built by Ottoman authorities in Hungary between 1543 and 1548, on the orders of the third pasha of Buda, and has a shallow dome covered with lead plates and wooden tiles. It was left undamaged when the Habsburg armies captured the area during the Second Battle of Buda in 1686, but was converted into a Roman Catholic chapel by the Jesuits, who renamed it "St Joseph's Chapel".

The land later came under the ownership of János Wagner, who maintained the site and allowed access to Muslim pilgrims coming from the Ottoman Empire (see Islam in Hungary). In 1885, the Ottoman government commissioned a Hungarian engineer to restore the tomb and, when work was completed in 1914, it was declared a national monument. The site was restored again in the 1960s and in the 1990s and is now the property of the Republic of Turkey. A large-scale renovation was completed in October 2018, when the site was inaugurated by Hungarian prime minister Viktor Orbán and Turkish president Recep Tayyip Erdoğan.

== See also ==
- Batiniyya
- Taṣawwuf
