= Islam in Hungary =

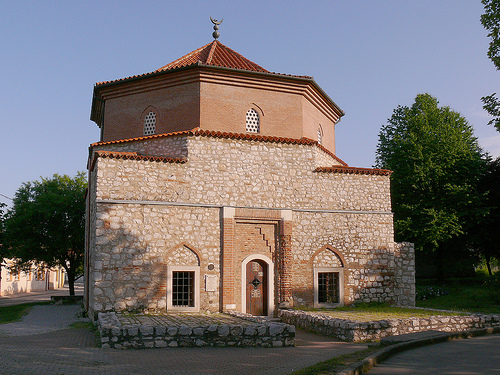
Malkoç Bey Mosque in Siklós, built in the 16th century.

Islam in Europe by percentage of country population 95–100%: Azerbaijan; 90–95%: Turkey; Kosovo; 50–70%: Albania; Bosnia and Herzegovina; Kazakhstan; 30–35%: North Macedonia; 10–20%: France; Sweden; Georgia; Montenegro; 5–10%: Austria; Belgium; Bulgaria; Denmark; Germany; Liechtenstein; Luxembourg; Netherlands; Russia; Switzerland; United Kingdom; Spain; Greece; 4–5%: Serbia; 2–4%: Italy; Finland; Norway; Malta; Slovenia; Cyprus (Note: Only takes into account the Muslim population residing on land controlled by the Republic of Cyprus.); 1–2%: Croatia; Ireland; Ukraine; Andorra; < 1%: Iceland; Armenia; Belarus; Czech Republic; Estonia; Hungary; Latvia; Lithuania; Moldova; Monaco; Poland; Portugal; Romania; San Marino; Slovakia

Islam in Hungary dates back to the foundation of the state in the late 9th century, with Muslims constituting a portion of the conquering Hungarian tribes. Between the 10th and 13th centuries, it attracted additional Muslim settlers of diverse ethnic origins. The influence of Sunni Islam was especially pronounced in the 16th and 17th centuries during the Ottoman period in Hungary. Moreover, the state has long absorbed movements of ethnic Bosnian, Albanian and Turkish Muslims.

== History ==
=== Early history ===
According to reports in the 9th and 10th centuries, Islam was practiced by a significant minority of the conquering Hungarians. The Muslim population in Hungary was joined by additional Muslim settlers between the 10th and 13th centuries. In the old form of the Hungarian language, Muslims were often called Böszörmény, which in turn descends from Arabic: مسلم, Muslim. This term is preserved as both a family name, and as that of the town Hajdúböszörmény. Amongst other names of Muslims in early Hungary were Khalyzians, Saracen and Ishmaelites.

The first Islamic author to speak of this Muslim community was Yaqut al-Hamawi (575-626 AH/1179-1229 CE), he writes about a famous Hungarian student who studied in Aleppo. According to the student, there were 30 Muslim villages in Hungary. Yaqut writes in his famous geographical dictionary, "Mu'ajam al-Buldan", about his meeting with a Hungarian Muslim youth in Syria who was studying Islam there and brought some details of the history and life of their people in Hungary.

The Spaniard Muslim traveler Abu Hamid al Garnati wrote of two types of Muslims in the country, the first being the Böszörmény and the second being the Khalyzians (Khwarezmians). He reported that Géza II of Hungary expressed a great fondness of Muslims.

In the 11th century, St. Ladislaus and later Coloman passed laws against the non-Christians (Synod of Szabolcs). These laws subdued Islam by coercing Muslims to eat pork, go to Church, intermarry, and to forbid them from celebrating Friday. Some of Coloman's laws include:

§ 46 If someone catches Ismaelites in fasting or eating or on keeping away from pork or in ritual washing or in other false practices these Ismaelites have to be sent to the king and whoever sued them shall receive a share from their properties.

§ 47 We command all Ismaelite villages to build a church and finance it. After the church is built the half village should move and settle elsewhere in order to become similar to us in living together and also in Christ and in Church (i.e. become similar in faith).

§ 48 Ismaelites should not marry their daughters to their nation but only to our nation.

§ 49 If an Ismaelite has guest, or he invites someone to his house to eat, he and his guests should all eat only pork.

László (Saint Ladislaus) passed the following law:

§ 9 on the merchants called Ismaelites, if becomes evident from them then after their baptism they return their old laws based on circumcision they should leave their homes but if they prove innocent they should stay.

These laws discriminated severely against the small minority.

Muslims in Hungary were reported to have often worked in the field of trade and finance. A ring with an Arabic inscription was found in the grave of Béla II of Hungary. Furthermore, Hungarian royal coins from between the 12th and 13th centuries were found to have Arabic inscriptions. Whilst the presence of Arabic inscriptions does not directly imply a connection with Islam, Arabic-speaking populations were predominantly Muslim.

Káliz Road, named after the Muslim Khalyzians, was a trade route between Szeged and the Danube used for the transport of salt from Transylvania.

Jenő Szűcs states that prior to the Mongol invasions of the 13th century, "the country was pretty much strewn with military and merchant colonies of Muslim religious groups".

=== Turkish rule in Hungary ===
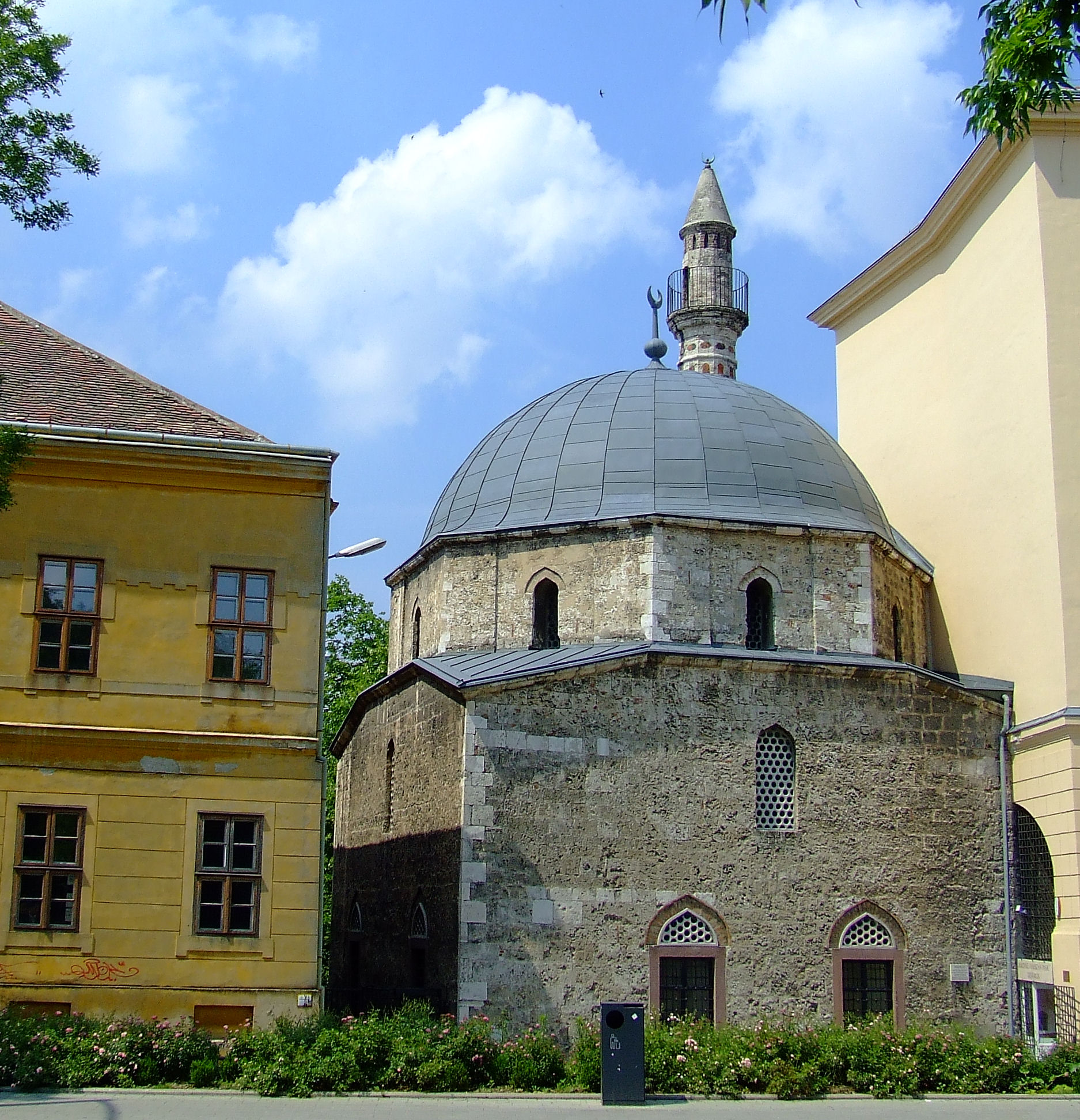
Yakovalı Hasan Paşa Mosque in Pécs

From the late 14th century, Hungarians were faced with the growing presence of the Turkish Empire in neighbouring parts of the Balkans.

The Muslim Turks began to establish control in the Kingdom of Hungary after the Battle of Mohács in 1526. In 1541, they gained control of the centre of the former kingdom and established the Budin eyalet. They later established the Temeşvar, Eğri, Kanije and Varat eyalets. The Principality of Transylvania and short-lived Principality of Upper Hungary (covering most of present-day Slovakia) were established as Ottoman vassals.

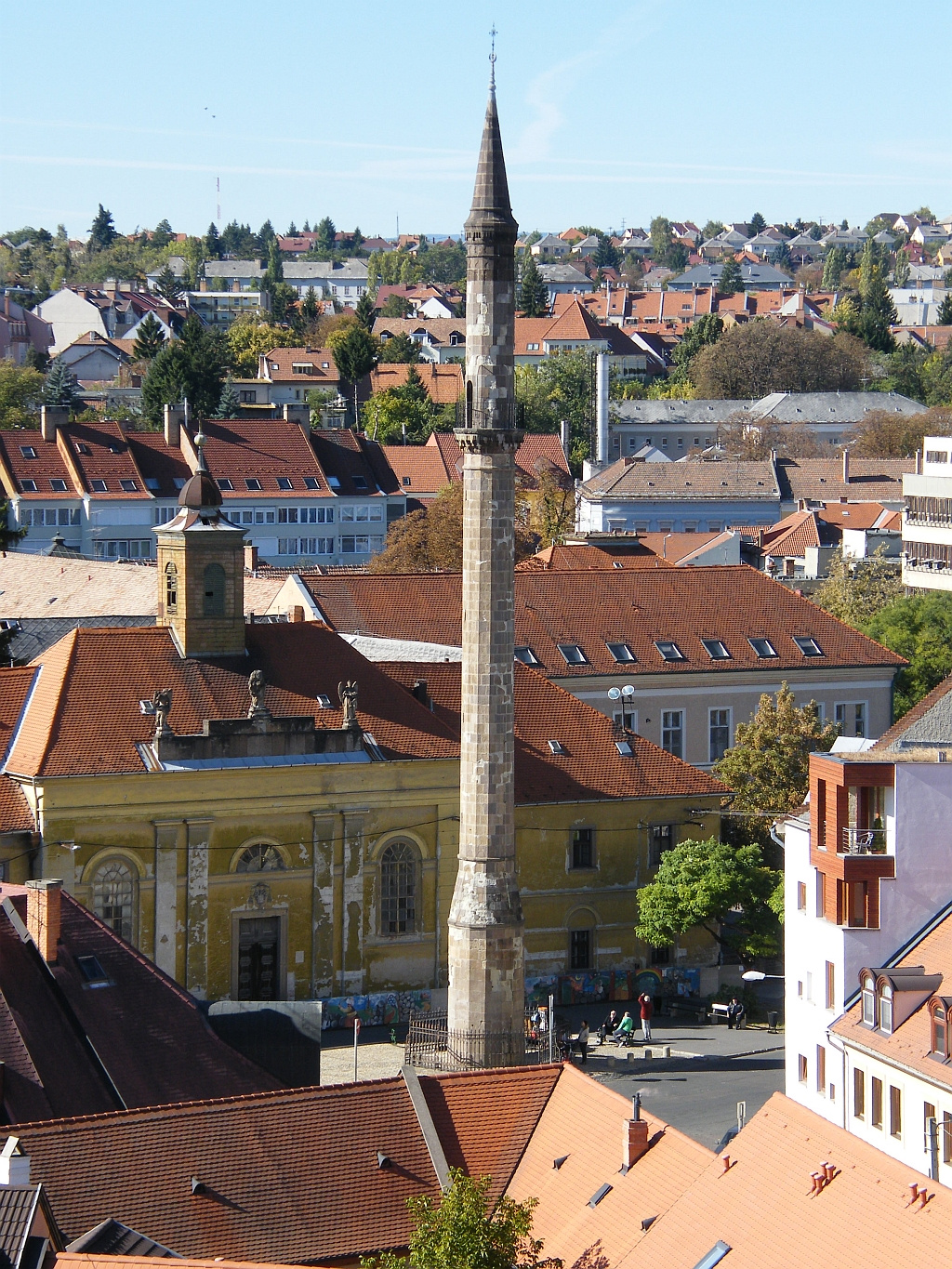
Minaret of Eger

In the 16th and 17th centuries, numerous Muslim personalities were born in Hungary. Among them, the most important were the Ottoman Grand Vizier, Kanijeli Siyavuş Pasha (from Nagykanizsa) who held the function three times between 1582 and 1593, the Ottoman historian İbrahim Peçevi (Ibrahim of Pécs), the famous Mevlevian dervish Pecsevi Árifi Ahmed Dede, also a Turk native of Pécs, and the famous Ottoman army officer, historian, and travel writer Osman Ağa of Temeşvar, from Temesvár.

Churches in Hungary were repurposed as mosques, which sometimes involved architectural changes, although Islamic architectural features were removed from the vast majority of churches following the Ottoman retreat.

Turkish rule in the Hungarian lands ended definitively in 1718, with the signing of the Treaty of Passarowitz. The Ottoman period left behind a legacy of Turkish architecture such as mosques, türbes, and public baths (hamams), as well as changes in the local cuisine, such as the popularization of coffeehouses and the introduction of paprika, an essential spice in Hungarian dishes.

=== Modern era ===
Following the end of Turkish rule in Hungary, the country continued to border the Turkish Empire, and experienced various influxes of migration of Bosniak, Albanian and Turkish Muslims.

In the 19th century, after the collapse of the revolution of 1848-9, more than 6,000 emigrated Poles and Hungarians followed General Józef Bem (Murat Paşa) into Turkish exile. Among them were such Hungarian officers such as Richard Guyon (Kurşid Paşa), György Kmety (Ismail Paşa) and Maximilian Stein (Ferhad Paşa). These personalities were afterwards raised to the post of General.

Guyon is described in the Oxford Dictionary of National Biography as "the first Christian to obtain the rank of pasha and a Turkish military command without being obliged to change his religion", a sign of modernizing meritocracy under the 19th-century Ottomans.

In 1913, Austria-Hungary annexed Ada Kaleh, which should have meant Hungarians would administer it. Ada Kaleh was inhabited by Turkish Muslims, and some Turkish Families of them settled in Mainland Hungary. The increasing number of Muslim soldiers in the Austro-Hungarian army in WW1 also necessitated new measures. Since 2007 Romanian Citizens went to Hungary as workers including also Tatars-Turks and Muslim Roma from Dobruja in Romania.

The council of Újbuda has given permission for the Muslim community in Hungary to build the first Islamic centre in Budapest. The new Islamic centre will hold a library containing 50,000 volumes.

In 2013, the Hungarian Islamic Council requested for the Grand Mufti of Bosnia and Herzegovina Husein Kavazović to also become Grand Mufti of Hungary.

==== Religious law ====
Hungary's new "Law on the Right to Freedom of Conscience and Religion, and on Churches, Religions and Religious Communities" was enacted 12 July 2011 and recognizes only 14 religious groups. Islam is not included in this list and Muslims have to apply to get official recognition under the new law. Under the law, only 14 of 358 registered churches and religious associations will be granted legal recognition, while others will have to reapply for legal registration after two-thirds approval in parliament.

On 27 February 2012, Hungary's parliament amended the country's controversial law on religious organizations by expanding the list of officially recognized organizations to include the Hungarian Islamic Council.

== Demographics ==
According to the 2011 Hungarian census, there were 5,579 Muslims in Hungary, making up only about 0.057% of the total population. Of these, 4,097 (73.4%) declared themselves as ethnically Hungarian, while 2,369 (42.5%) declared themselves as ethnically Arab. In Hungary people can declare more than one ethnicity (which explains why the sum of these percentages is greater than 100%), Data from 2011 does not show the Turkish population (which was 1,565 in the 2001 census). However, the majority of Muslims in Hungary are of Arab or Turkish origin. Moreover, there is also a growing number of ethnic Hungarian converts to Islam.

The actual number of Muslims in Hungary is likely to be above 5,579 Muslims. Following the war in Syria, an important influx of asylum seekers arrived in 2014, 2015 and 2016 where more than 200,000 asylum applications were filed in Hungary. However, from 2017 and onwards, Hungarian authorities have registered less than few hundred applications.

== Notable people ==
- Gyula Germanus, writer and politician, Islamologist
- István Horthy Jr., physicist and architect, grandson of Admiral Miklós Horthy
- Ibrahim Muteferrika, publisher, economist, historian, Islamic theologian, sociologist

== Gallery ==
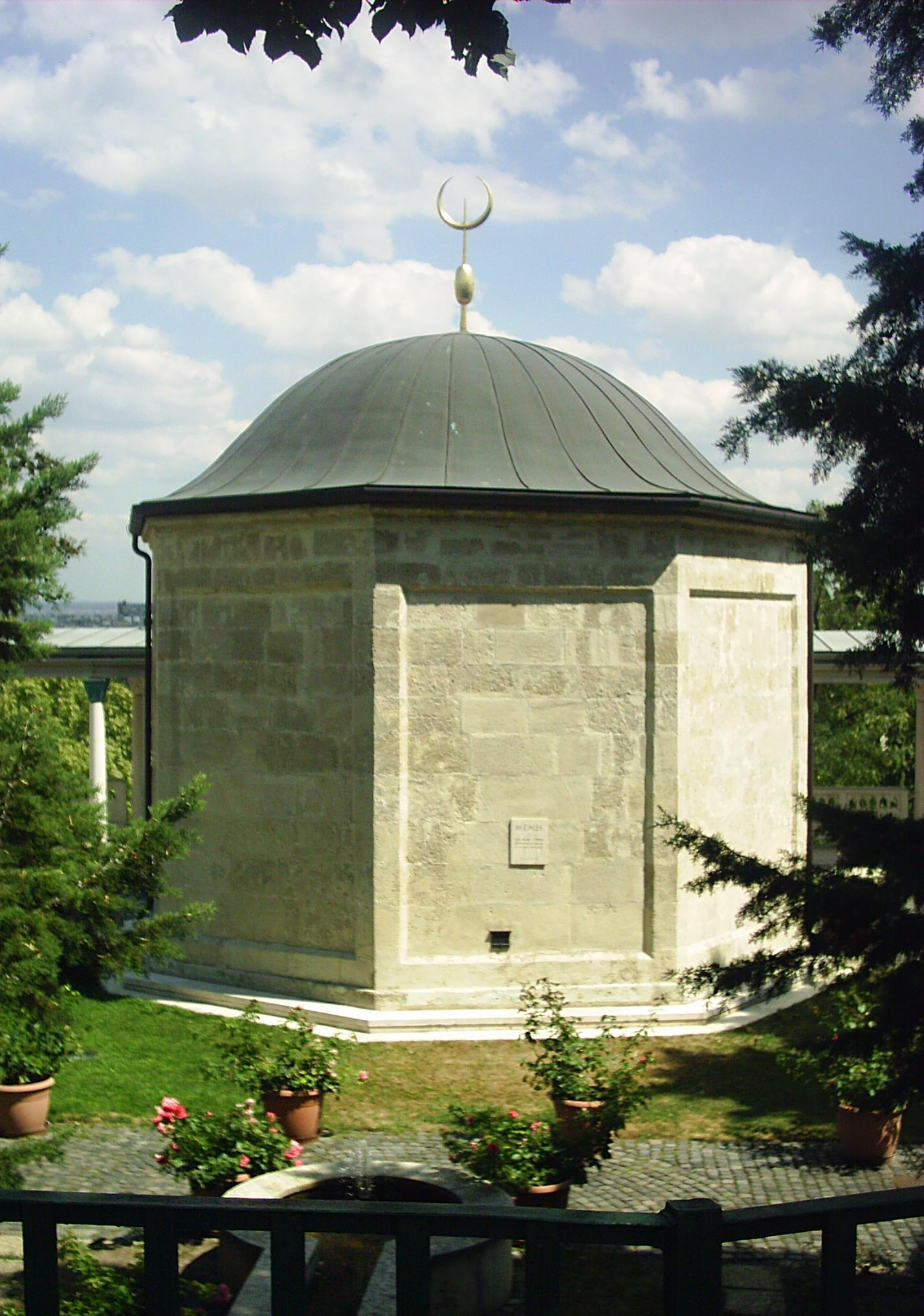
The türbe of Gül Baba, several works of Islamic art can be visited

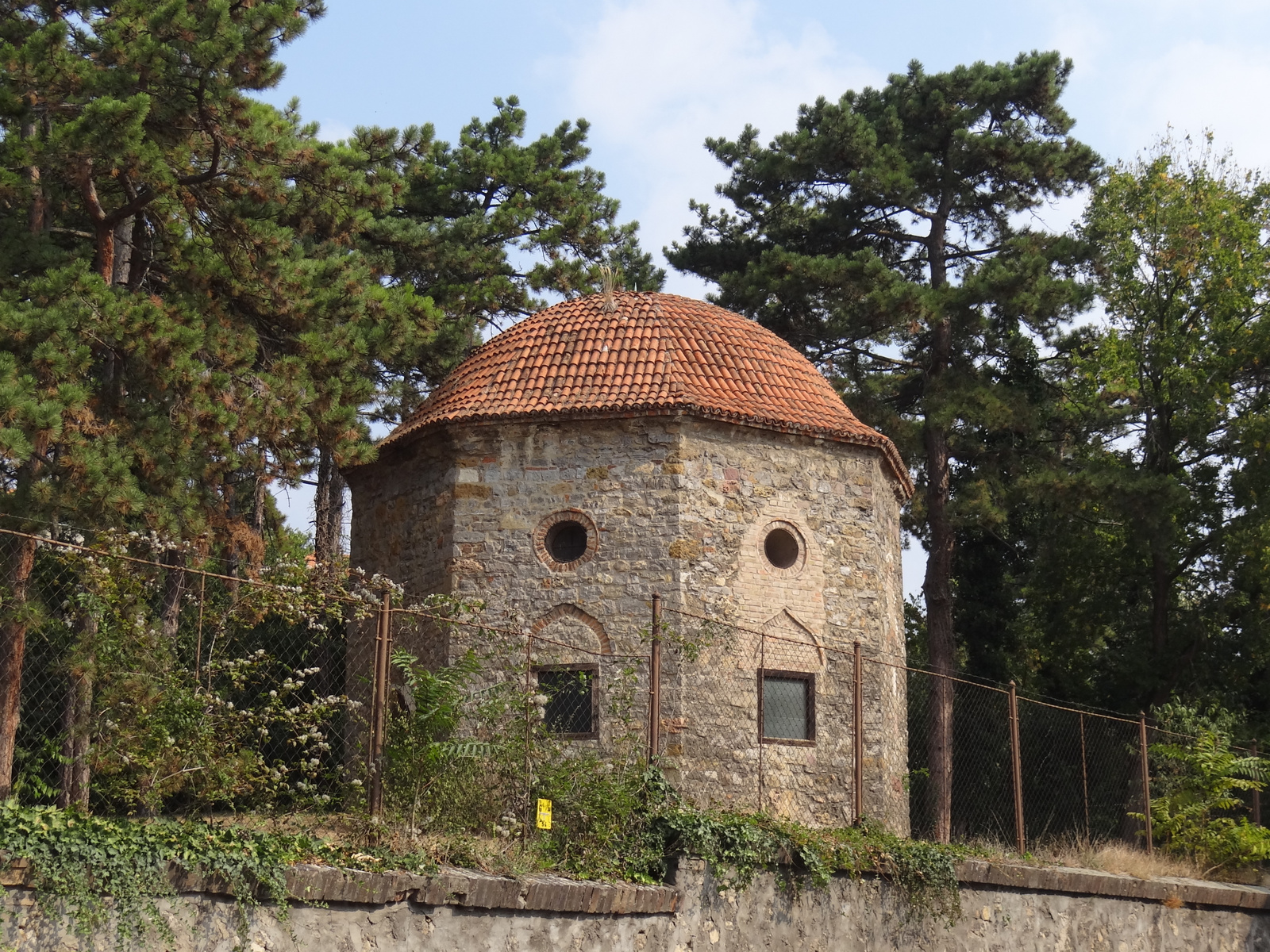
The türbe of Idrisz Baba in Pécs

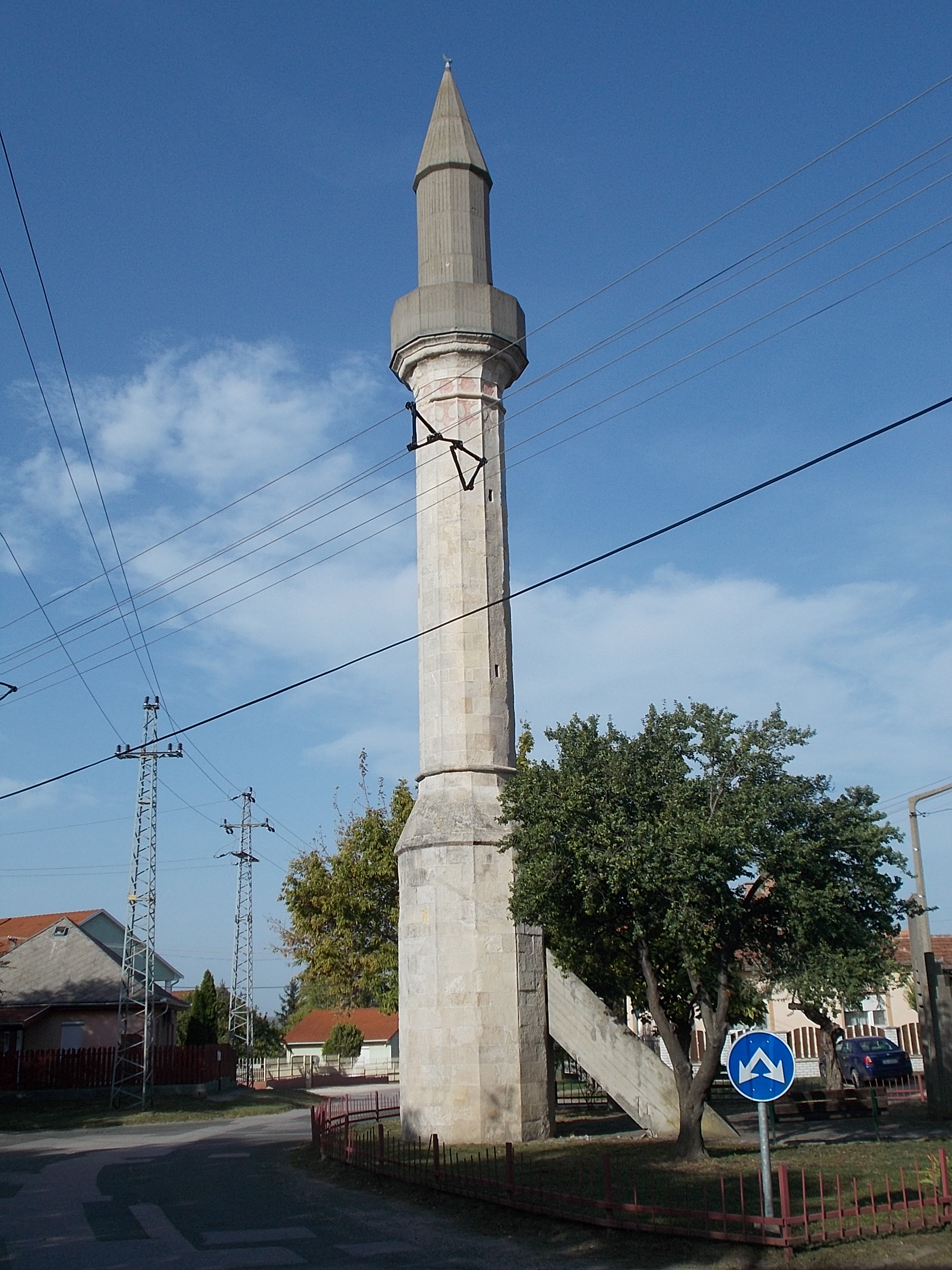
Érd minaret

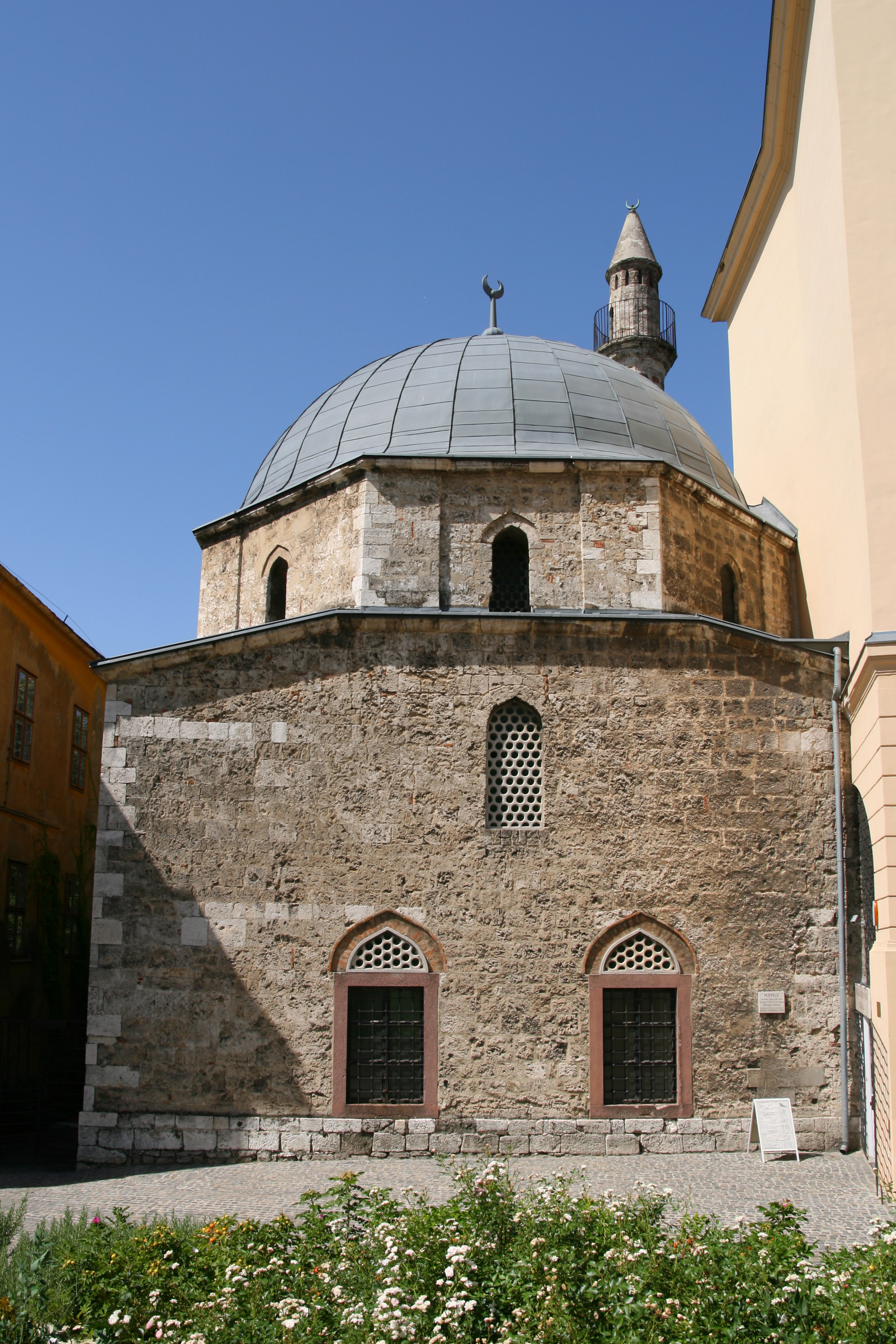
The Yakovalı Hasan Paşa Mosque in Pécs

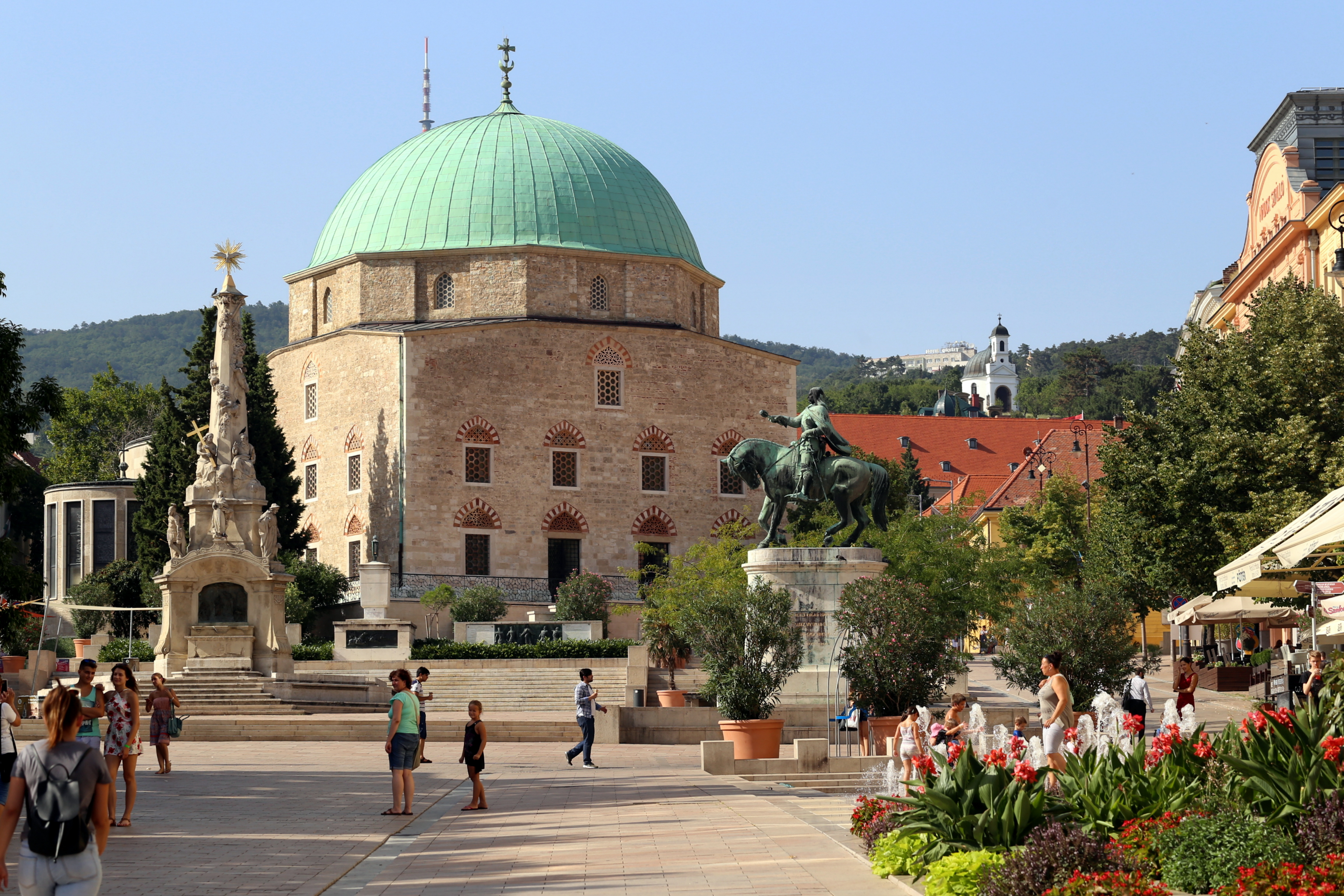
Former Mosque of Pasha Qasim in Pécs, now used as a Catholic church

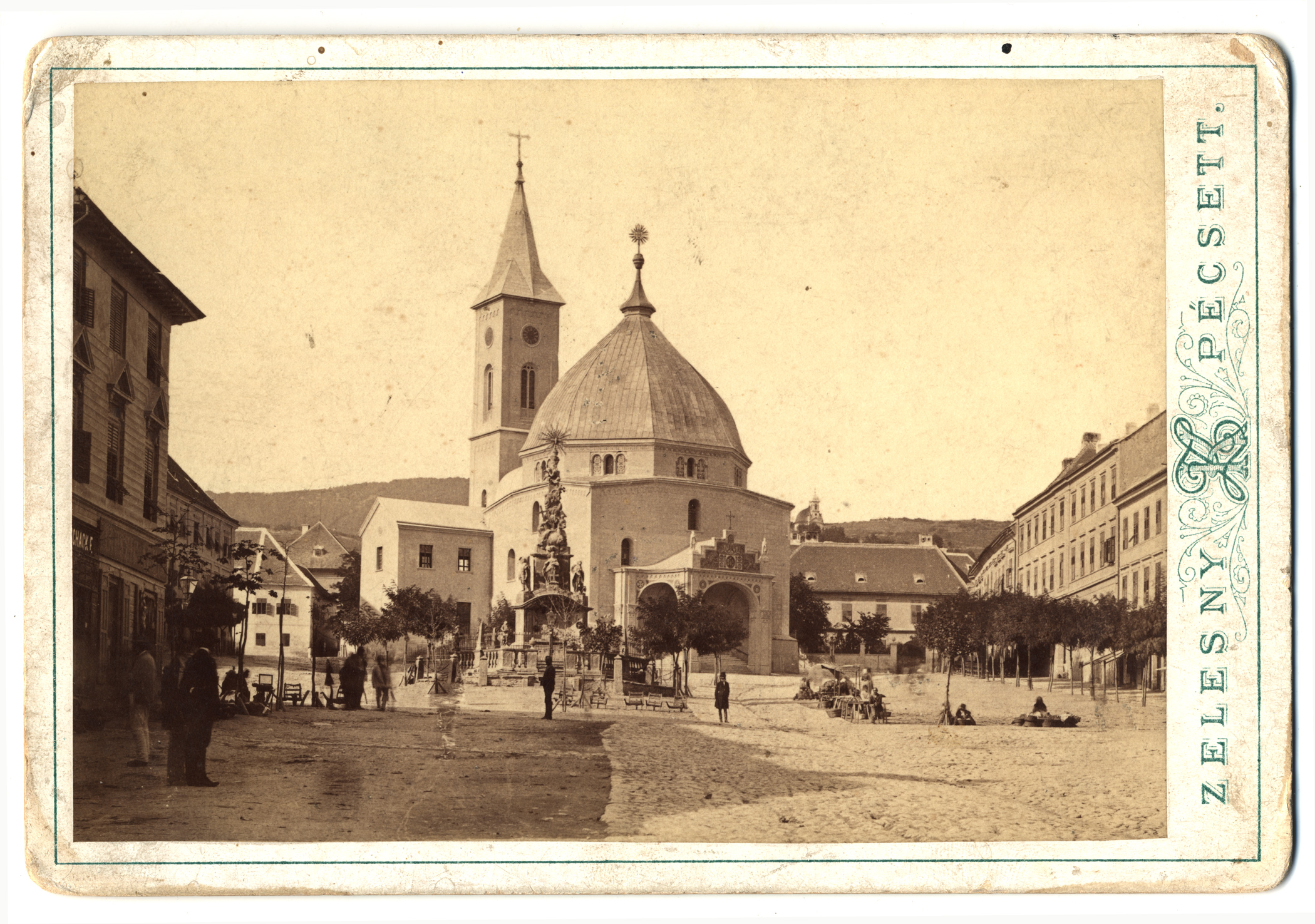
Mosque of Pasha Qasim in the 1880s

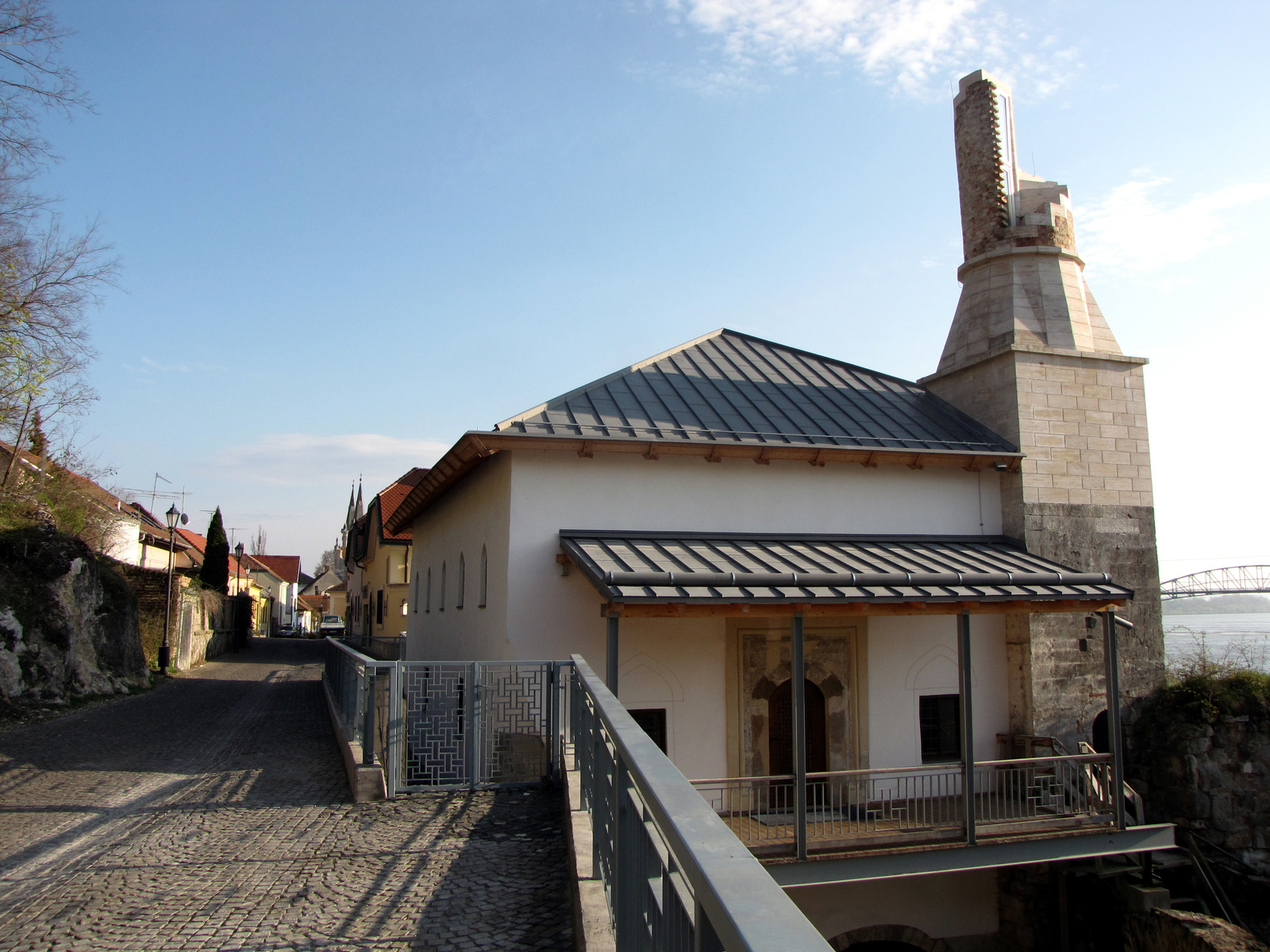
Özicseli Hadzsi Ibrahim Mosque in Esztergom

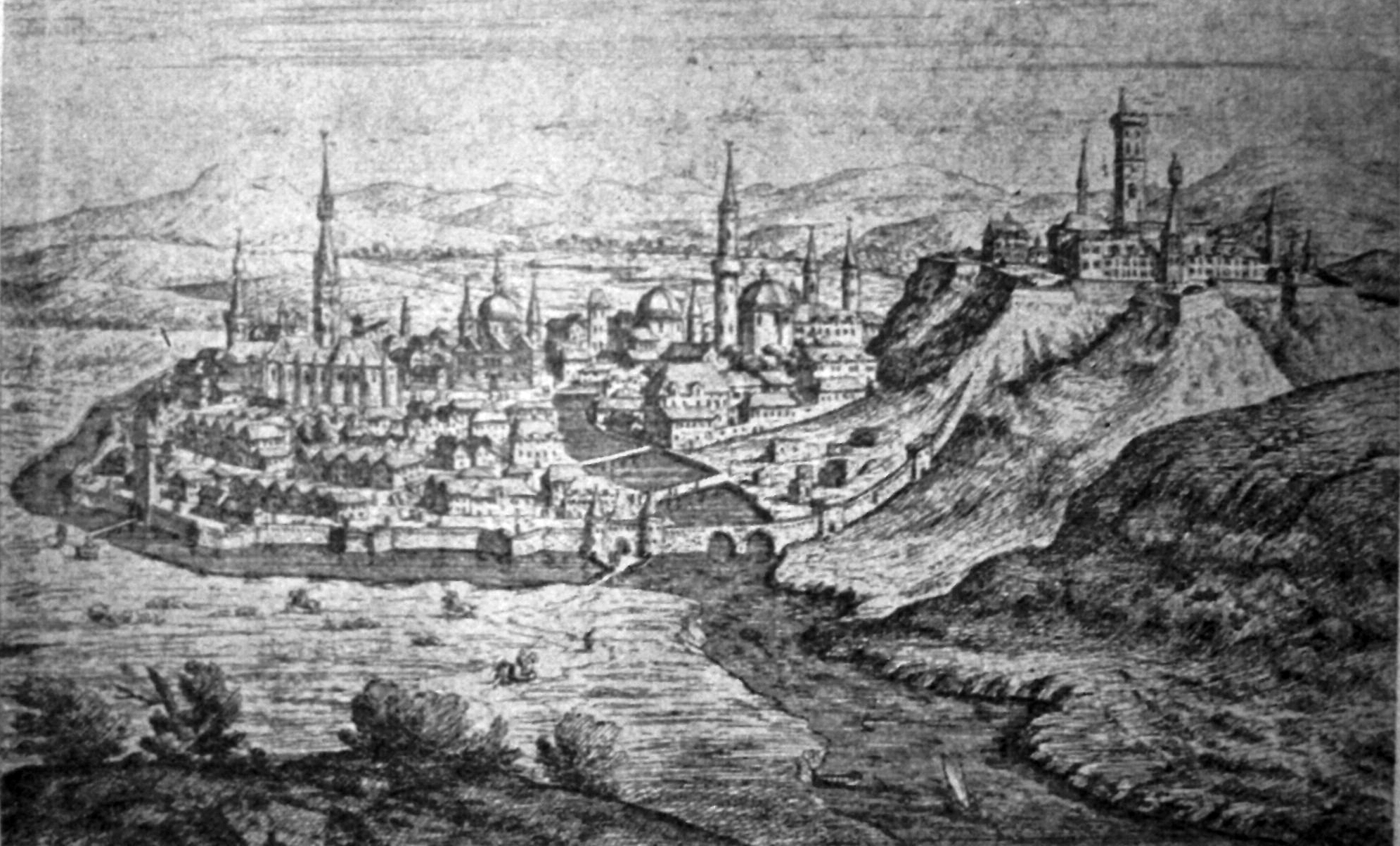
Eger city in 16th century with mosques and minarets

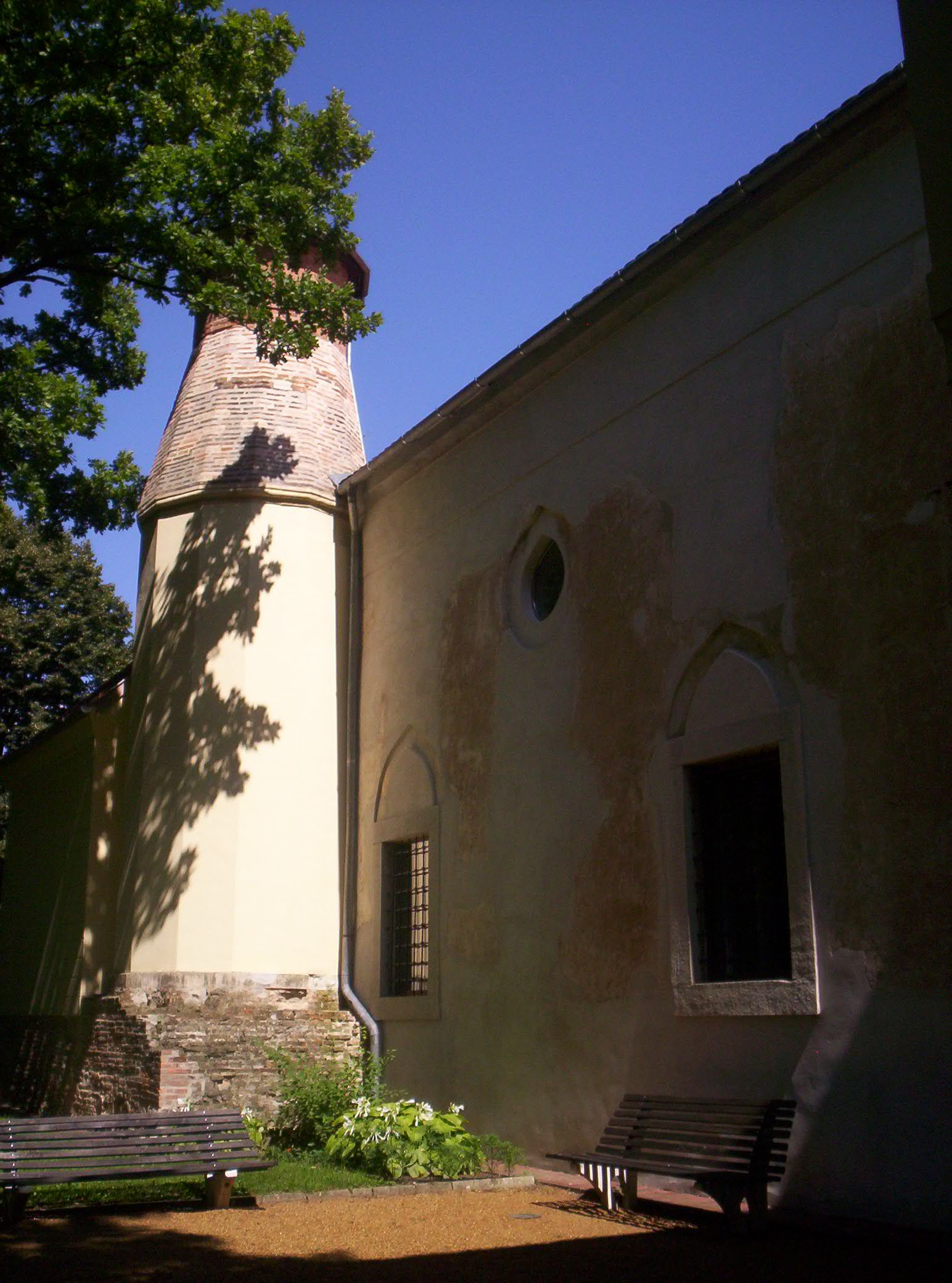
The Mosque of Sultan Suleiman in Szigetvár

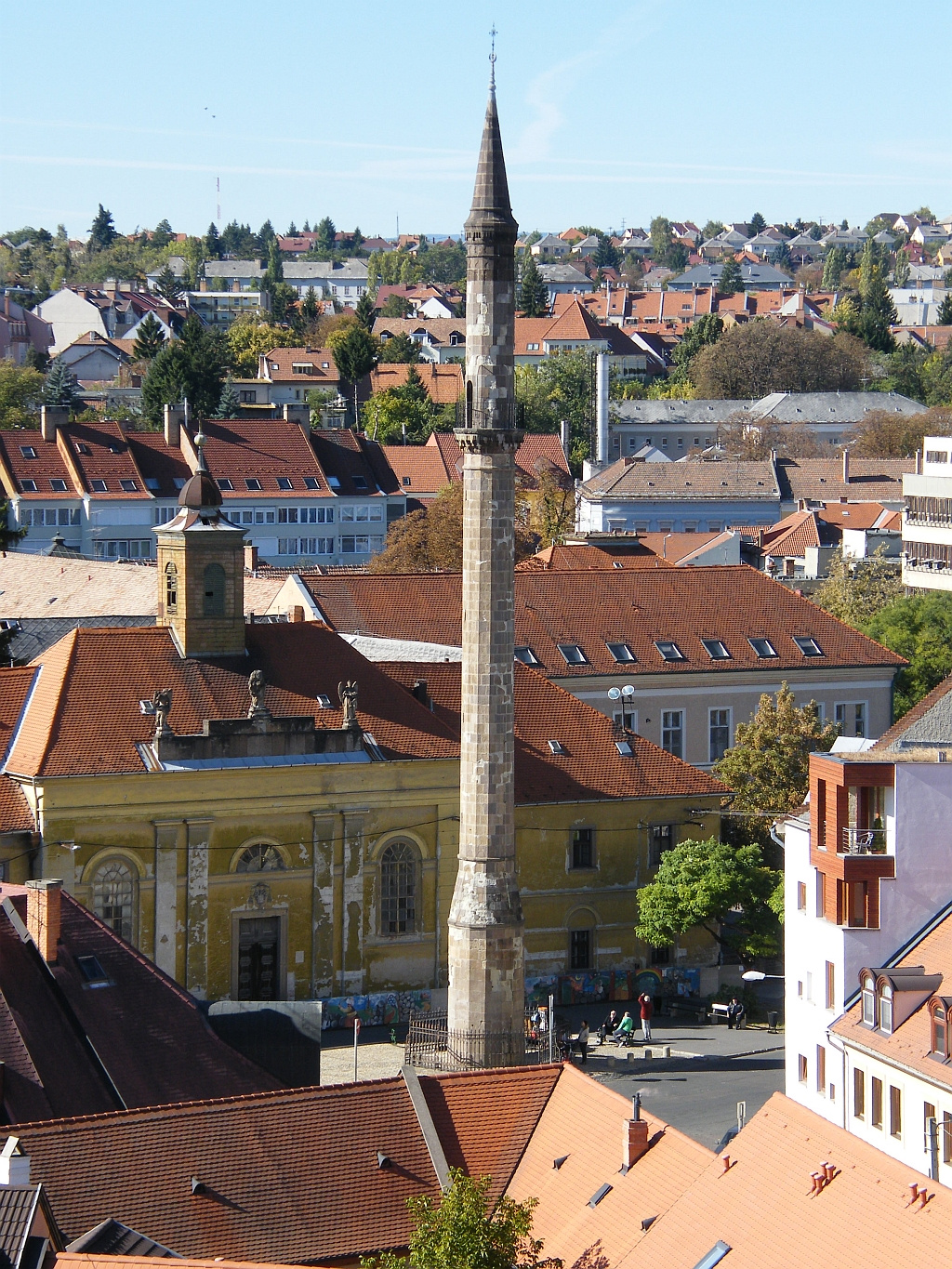
Eger minaret

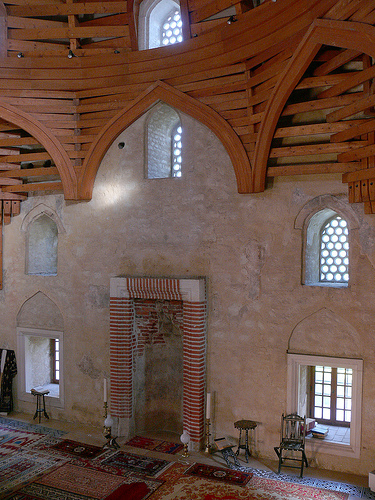
Interior of Malkoç Bey Mosque in Siklós

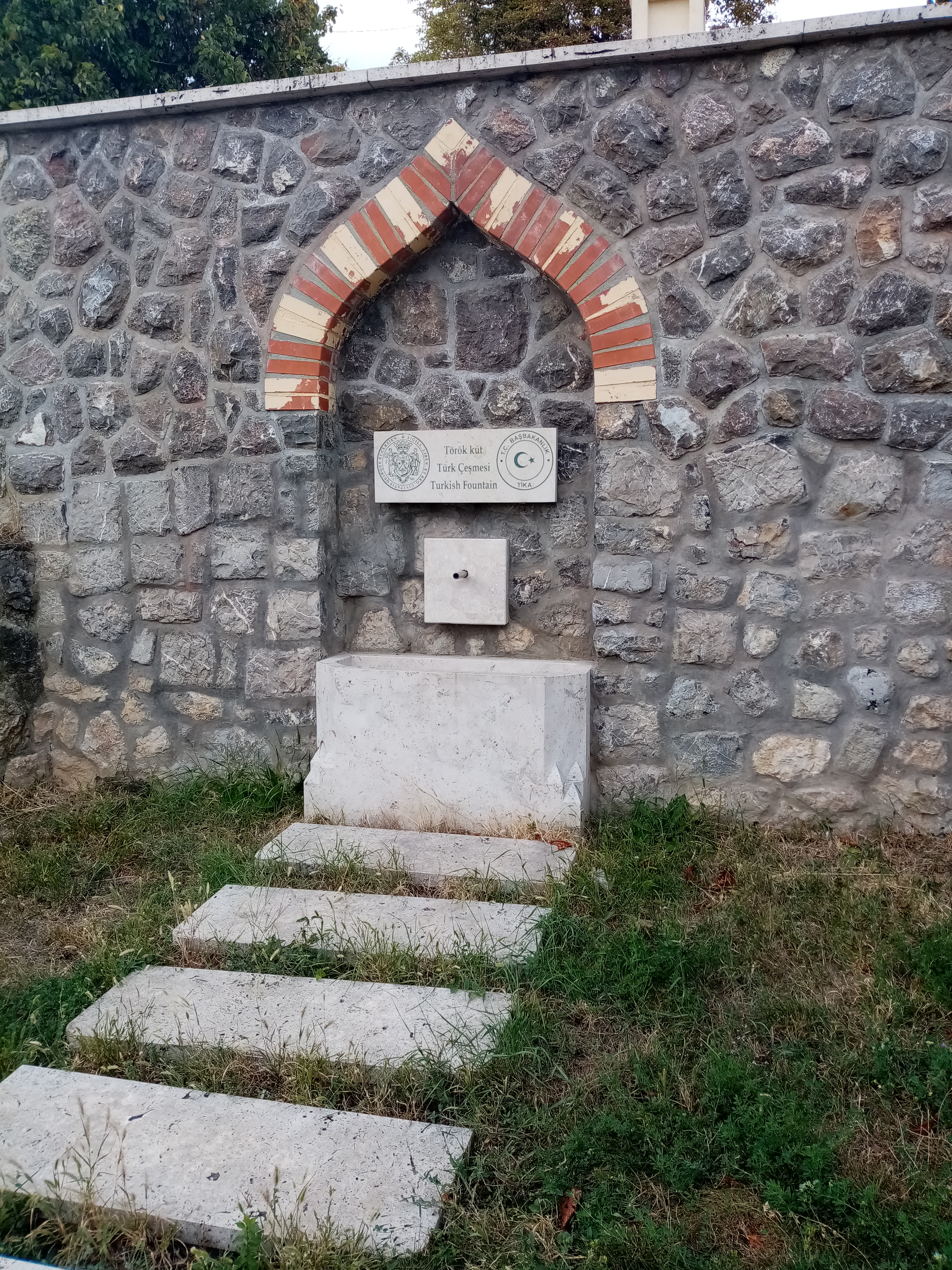
Idrisz Baba's well

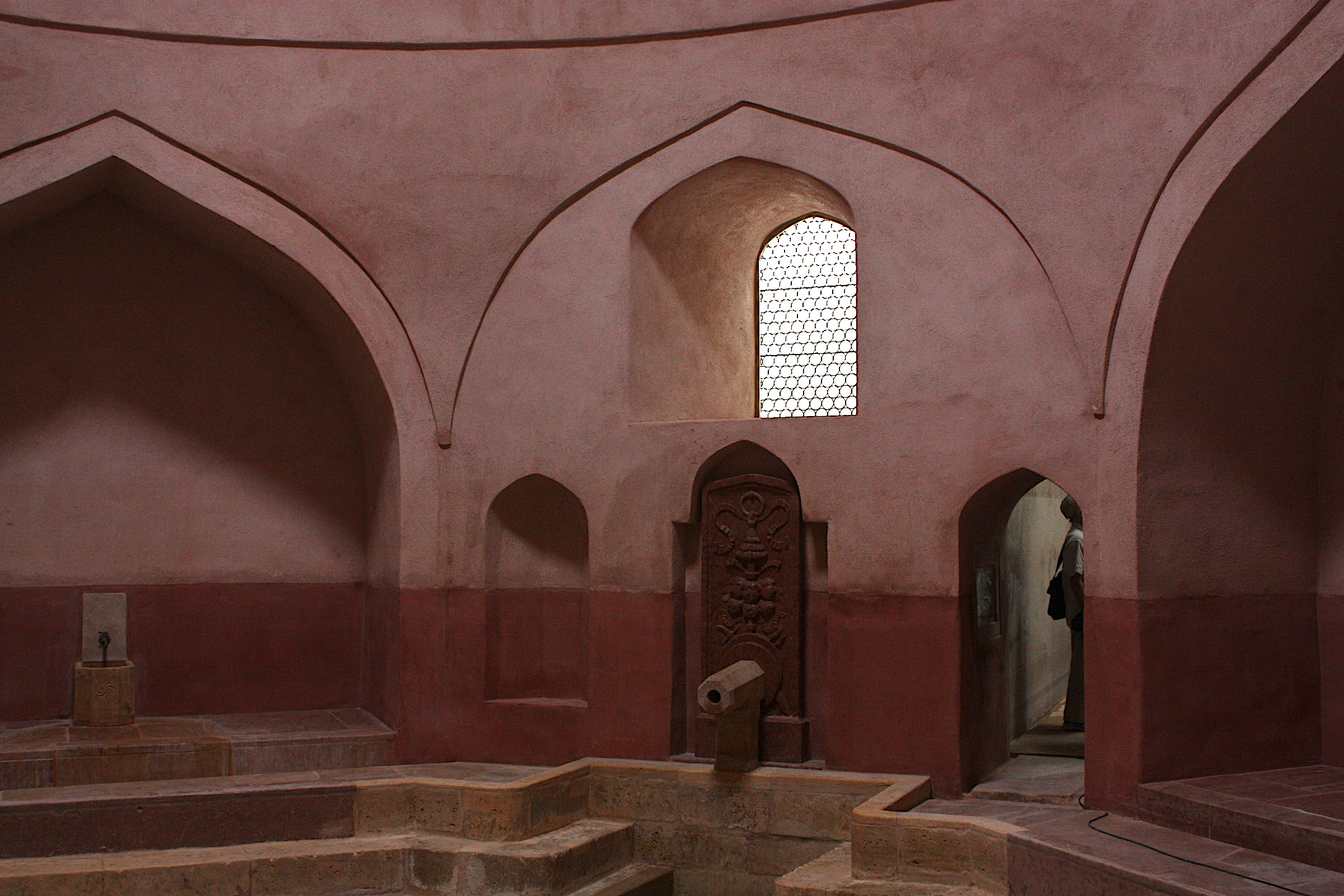
The Turkish bath in the Rác Thermal Bath

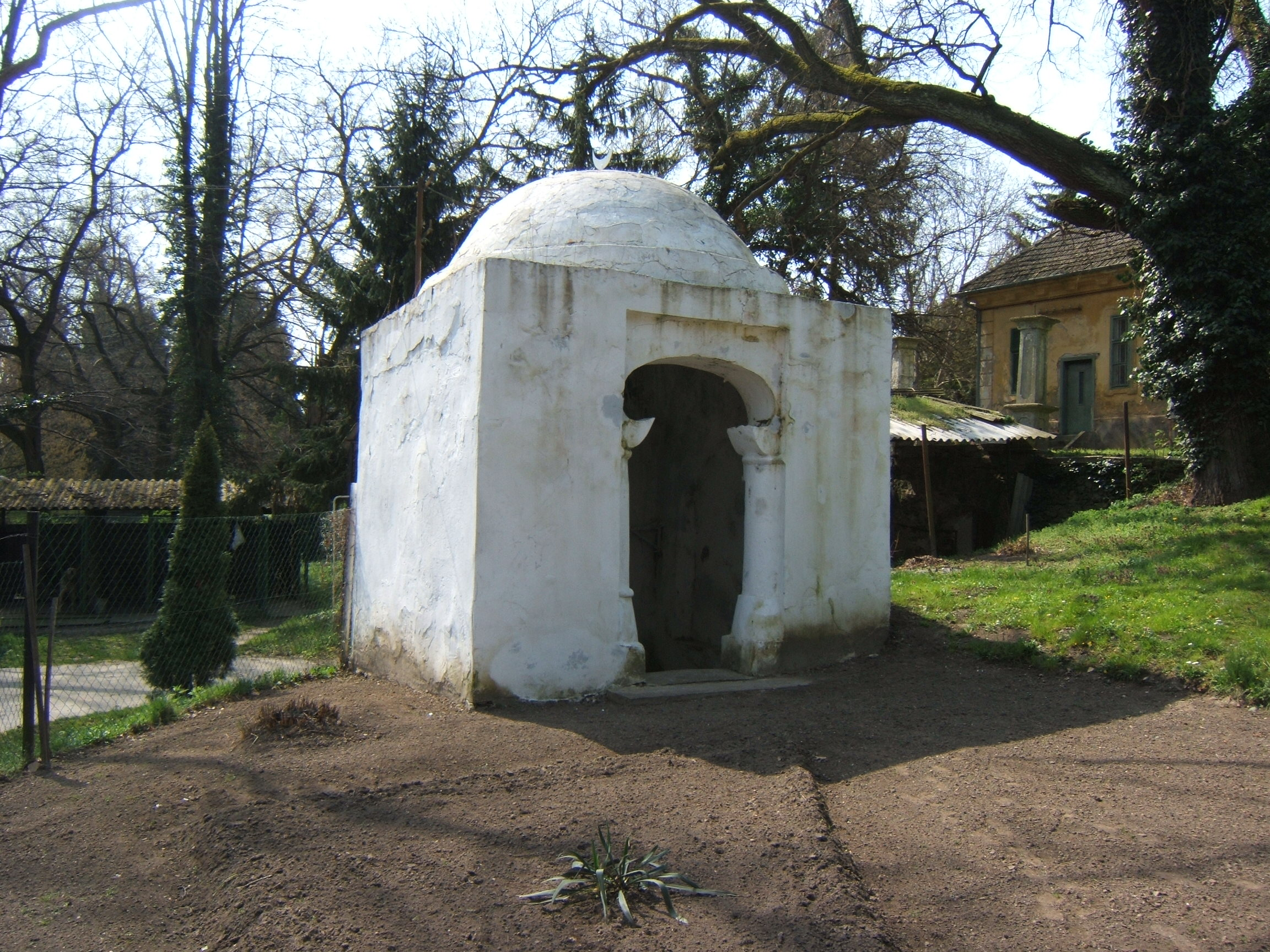
Ottoman well in Babócsa

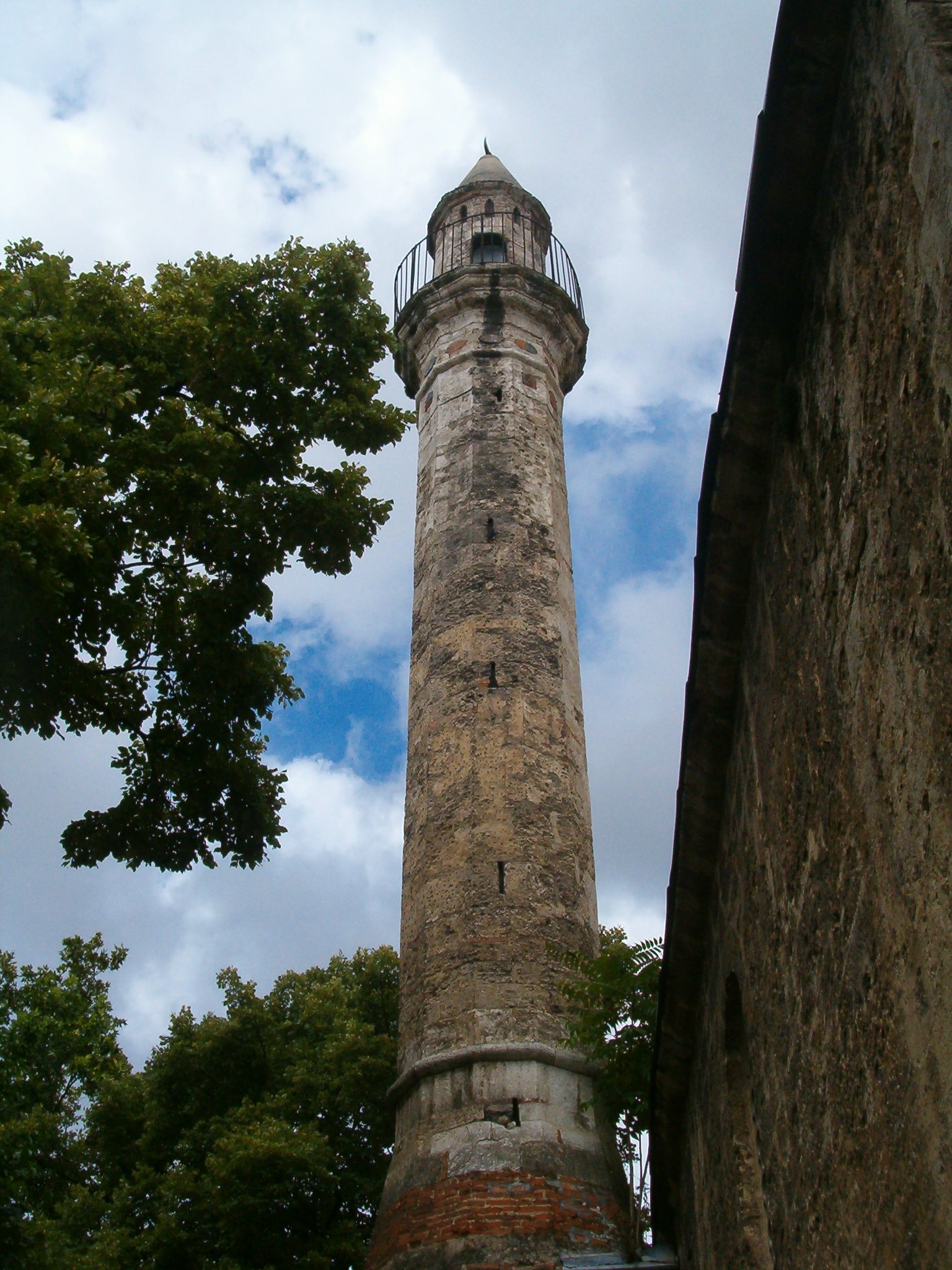
Ottoman minaret in Pécs

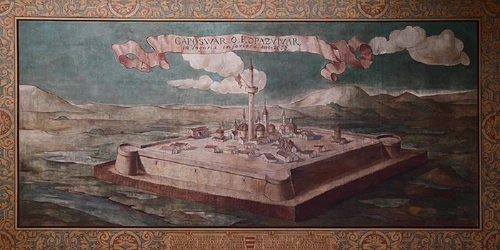
Kaposvár in the 1680s

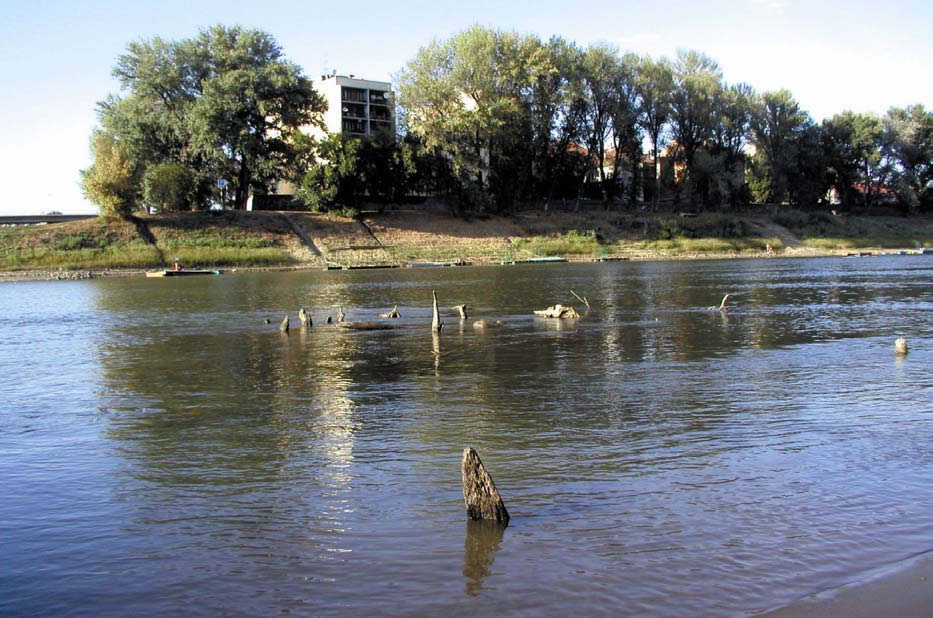
The remains of the Ottoman wooden bridge pile marks in Szolnok

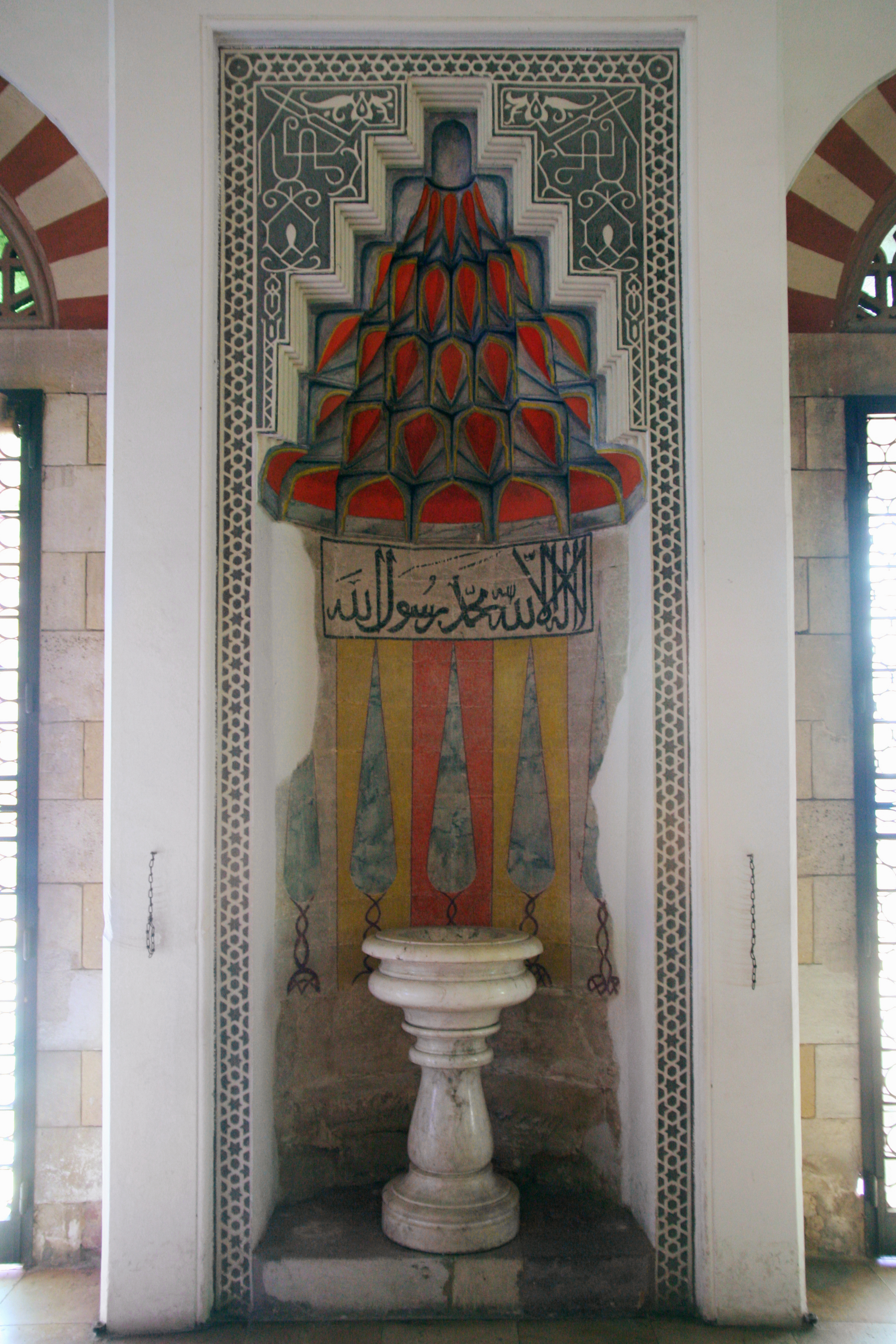
Fountain in the Mosque of Pasha Qasim in Pécs

== See also ==
- Hungarian Islamic Council
- List of mosques in Hungary
- Gül Baba
- Almış (Almas) iltäbär
- Böszörmény
- Khalyzians
- Turks in Hungary
- Kunság
- Jászság
