= Arraid =

Ukrainian social organization federation

Arraid is the independent Federation of Social Organizations registered on 7 February 1997 in Kyiv, Ukraine. The Federation of Social Organizations "Arraid" is a confederation of nine organizations located in different cities of Ukraine: "Al-Manar" - in Kharkiv, "Al-Masar" - in Odesa, "Al-Nour" - in Kyiv, "Al-Amal" - in Donetsk, "Ahrar" - in Simferopol, "Al-Bayan" - in Luhansk, "Al-Nibras" - in Lviv, "Al-Isra" - in Vinnytsia, "Al-Iman" - in Zaporizhia.

The structure of "Arraid" also includes the association "Ansar Foundation", engaged in translation on Russian of video, audio- and printed Arabic and English information about Islam.

“Arraid” is translated from Arabic as "pioneering". The Federation of Social Organizations (former Interregional Association of Public Organizations IAPO) was founded in 1997. The Association integrates public organizations from ten regional centers of Ukraine. The “Arraid” Association is a non-profit organization involved in cultural, educational and charitable activities, providing aid for Ukrainian citizens irrespective of their religion, confession or race. Its aims are as follows:

- teaching universal human values like goodness, compassion, humanism and justice, healthy life style and tolerance, upbringing of a moral individual; - arranging charitable actions, rendering social aid for the needy, caring out actions in health protection sector; - educative youth work (imparting morals and good manners); - cultural and teaching activities.

The Association became not only an important organization, but also a trustworthy one in the eyes of private and public sponsors. It could attract considerable sponsor funds from several countries of the Middle East and the EU.

“Arraid” Association is determined to proceed further. It envisages a great deal of new projects which will build a bridge of friendship between the Muslim world and Ukraine. “Arraid” is optimistic about the future, being aware that much more is to be done for the sake of social stability, peace and harmony in Ukraine.

== Main departments of the organization ==
- General secretariat : is engaged in public and administrative work, it communicates with domestic and foreign public organizations.
- Information department : prepares informational material and provides with it domestic and foreign organizations.
- Department of human development: to explain to Ukrainian people the basic principles and the truth of Islam, its importance and role in public development is one of the purposes of the given department. This department also carries out the charitable shares among the citizens of Ukraine, irrespective of their religion.
- Educational department : is occupied with preparation and development of educational and cultural programs, used in the activities of this organization.
- Department of planning : designs and realizes all the working drafts of the association.

== See also ==
- Clerical Board of Ukraine's Muslims
- Ar-Rahma Mosque
- Religious Administration of Muslims of Ukraine
- Kyiv Islamic Cultural Center
