= Kyiv Islamic Cultural Center =

Mosque and Islamic cultural center in Kyiv, Ukraine

Kyiv Islamic Cultural Centre
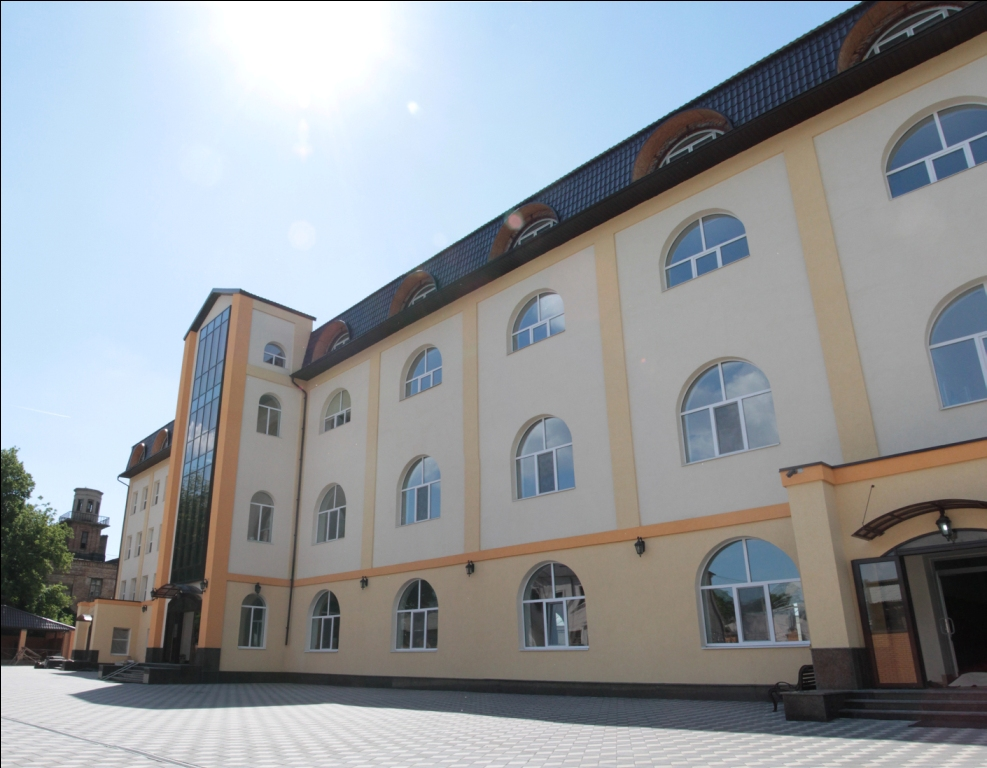

Religion
- Affiliation: Islam
- District: Kyiv, Ukraine
- Status: active

Location
- Interactive map of Kyiv Islamic Cultural Centre
- Coordinates: 50°27′38″N 30°27′20″E

Architecture
- Type: Mosque
- Groundbreaking: 2001
- Completed: 2015

Kyiv Islamic Cultural Centre (Ukrainian: Ісламський культурний центр та мечеть, romanized: Islamskyi kulturnyi tsentr ta mechet) (from 2001) – mosque and cultural organization in Kyiv, Ukraine. Islamic Cultural Centre (ICC) of Kyiv is one of the nine cultural centers located in the biggest cities of Ukraine. The building of ICC hosted the office of Religious Administration of Muslims of Ukraine “Ummah”, Ukrainian Centre for Islamic Studies, Shariah Committee, right protection organization Together with the law, Alraid Halal Certification and Research Center, publishing office Ansar Foundation, gymnasium Our Future, public organizations Mariam and An-Nur, head office of AUASO Alraid.

== Infrastructure of ICC ==
In two prayer's halls of ICC – men's and women's, which can contain approximately 1,500 people - Daily and Friday Prayers are held. Circles of Quran reading (tajwid) and memorizing Quran, lection about the basis of Islam (fiqh, sīra, etc.) open for Muslims. During the holy month, Ramadan, in ICC people gather for iftar every evening. Eid al-Fitr and Eid al-Adha are celebrated solemnly and joyously with entertaining program for children.

In the center for women's development in ICC workshops for personal development, classes and lections dedicated to different topics, including family psychology, often take place. Moreover, women have an opportunity to attend sewing and cooking circles, and fitness classes.

ICC courses on the Arabic language and Islamic culture are held using a specially developed program taught by native speakers.

== Activity ==
Main spheres of activity of ICC include promoting interreligious and intercultural dialog, spreading truthful information about Islam, breaking the myths about Islam and Muslims, and enriching of knowledge of Ukrainian Muslims.

=== Educational activity ===
From 2014 gymnasium Our Future have functioned in ICC. This is a private educational institution for primary and secondary school education, operating within the authority mandated by a state license. School use national educational standard. Using following link you can do virtual excursion to the gymnasium.

=== Public activity ===
In Islamic Cultural Centre of Kyiv “East Fest” was held on August 23, 2015 and May 14, 2016. That event wasn't a simple demonstration of Eastern traditions, but a link between representatives of different nations in our country.

On December 19, 2015 Islamic Cultural Centre of Kyiv hosted International Quran Recital Competition between representatives of Ukraine, post-soviet countries, near and far abroad countries. Altogether 56 participants took part in the competition; including one participant from Crimea and one from occupied Donbas area.

During July 20–24, 2015 our capital had hosted 4th International School for Islamic studies organized by AUASO Alraid and RAMU Ummah. It was dedicated actual questions of modern age. During 5 working days participants worked on searching for identity, dialog, conflict solving and extremism.

In ICC of Kyiv activists of public women's Muslim organization Mariam organized the Day of Ukrainian Culture on December 26, 2016. Quests learned about Ukrainian traditions, particularly women's role in Ukrainian society today and in historical aspect, traditions accompanying girl's life from her birth to motherhood. After tasting halal Ukrainian dishes, prepared by activists of Mariam, everybody could join the master class of Petrykivsky painting.

== See also ==
- Islam in Ukraine
- List of mosques in Europe
