= Islam in Ukraine =

Total population
- 1 million (2%)

Regions with significant populations
- Kyiv, Odesa, Kharkiv, Lviv, Dnipro, Zaporizhzhia, Simferopol

Religions
- Sunni Islam (majority), Shia Islam

Languages
- Main: Ukrainian, Crimean Tatar, Azerbaijani, Turkish, Uzbek, Arabic, Pashto

Islam in Europe by percentage of country population 95–100%: Azerbaijan; 90–95%: Turkey; Kosovo; 50–70%: Albania; Bosnia and Herzegovina; Kazakhstan; 30–35%: North Macedonia; 10–20%: France; Sweden; Georgia; Montenegro; 5–10%: Austria; Belgium; Bulgaria; Denmark; Germany; Liechtenstein; Luxembourg; Netherlands; Russia; Switzerland; United Kingdom; Spain; Greece; 4–5%: Serbia; 2–4%: Italy; Finland; Norway; Malta; Slovenia; Cyprus (Note: Only takes into account the Muslim population residing on land controlled by the Republic of Cyprus.); 1–2%: Croatia; Ireland; Ukraine; Andorra; < 1%: Iceland; Armenia; Belarus; Czech Republic; Estonia; Hungary; Latvia; Lithuania; Moldova; Monaco; Poland; Portugal; Romania; San Marino; Slovakia

Islam in Ukraine is a minority religious affiliation with Muslims representing 2% of the total population. The religion has a long history in Ukraine dating back to Berke Khan of the Ulug Ulus (Golden Horde) in the 13th century and the establishment of the Crimean Khanate in the 15th century.

== History ==
The ancestors of modern Ukrainians acquired the first information about the Muslim world during trade operations, travels and military campaigns. Rusychi traveled to Itil most often through Desna, Seim and Oskil. This was the direct contact with the country, which was greatly influenced by the Arab-Muslim culture. The acquaintance of Kievan Rus' with Islam was also facilitated by the military campaigns of the Rus to the East, where they came into contact with representatives of Muslim countries. This is, for example, the campaign of Prince Volodymyr of Kiev to Bulgar in 985, where Islam was declared the state religion in 922.

The first Muslims on the territory of Kievan Rus were representatives of peoples who migrated from the Azov region to the Don. Medieval chronicles reported that the some ancestors of modern Ossetians, Alans were converting to Islam at the beginning of the 8th century. Alan burials, carried out according to the Muslim rite, were found by modern archaeologists in the south-east of Ukraine. Accurate evidence of the permanent presence of Muslims in Kievan Rus dates back to the 11th century, when the Kiev prince had a cavalry of Muslim Pechenegs.

The second period is defined as the military-colonization period. It is about settling in a permanent place of peoples who profess Islam, as well as the colonization policy of the Ottoman Empire in the Northern Black Sea region and Transnistria. This means the consolidation of a part of the Tatars in the Crimea. The Crimean peninsula became the main area for the spread of Islam in the lands that are now part of independent Ukraine. It was here that the Crimean Tatar civilization was born and strengthened. In Crimea, Islam became the state religion of the Crimean Khanate, which maintained its full or partial independence for more than 300 years.

In the Crimea from the 13th to the 16th century, the formation of the Crimean Tatars as a separate ethnic group with its Islamic religion grew and became established. For a long time, the Crimean peninsula was the main southern route through which the population of the Dnieper region received information about Islam and Muslims.

Sunnism of the Hanafi madhhab spread in the Crimea. The Hanafites were the khans of the Golden Horde, it was this legal school of Islam that was the state religion of the Ottoman Empire.

The chronicles report on the settlement in Ukraine, when it was part of the Grand Duchy of Lithuania, of a significant number of Muslims from the Crimea, brought there under military law by Prince Vytautas. These Muslims would later from the modern Lipka Tatars. The first mosque that reliably existed in Ukraine was built in the city of Ostroh at the behest of Prince Konstantin Ostrogski (16th century) for the Muslims who were in his service.

Flag of the Crimean Tatars

=== The period of the Crimean Khanate ===
However, the firm influence of Islam in the Crimea is connected with the name of Khan Uzbek (1313-1341), who officially introduced Islam as the state religion on the peninsula and made the city of Solkhat the administrative center of the new ulus of the Golden Horde. He himself lived in the Crimea for some time, showing his subjects a model of adherence to the tenets of Islam. The legendary Tamerlane (1336-1405) completed the process of Islamization of the Crimean population by deposing the Golden Horde Khan Tokhtamysh. After the end of the Golden Horde period of its history, the Crimean ulus separated into an independent state entity, on the basis of which the Crimean Khanate arose. From 1427, the dynasty of khans from the Gerai family became the ruler.

In 1475, a new period in the history of the khanate began. In this year, the rulers of Crimea recognized the power of the Ottoman Empire as the caliph, the ruler of all Muslims. All the highest spiritual persons were appointed with the participation of representatives of the caliph and his name was praised every day in the Crimean mosques after the name of Allah. But, according to the laws of the Ottoman state, the Gerai dynasty was considered more noble than the dynasty of the Ottomans themselves and had to sit on the throne in the event of the termination of the Ottomans in the male line. Higher clergy became an influential force in the khanate. Chief among them was the mufti. He was considered the second person after the viceroy of the sultan and was a member of the State Council. This representative of the clergy became the supreme interpreter of Sharia laws.

The Mufti of the Crimea was a member of the State Council of the Empire - Divan. Next, places on the hierarchical steps were occupied by Sharia judges, mudaris (responsible for teaching in Muslim schools - madrasahs), imams, sheikhs (heads of Muslim brotherhoods), Sufu (members of brotherhoods or hermits). They cared about the enlightenment of Crimeans in the spirit of Islam, taught observance of its precepts, raised faithful Muslims and conscientious subjects. Islam became the basis of the spiritual life of the Crimean Tatar people. Mosques functioned in almost all significant settlements.

Throughout the existence of the Crimean Khanate, an atmosphere of religious tolerance prevailed in the state. Orthodox, Catholic, Greek, Armenian churches and monasteries, Jewish synagogues, and Karaite kenases operated freely on the territory of the state.

Under the influence of the ideas and norms of Islam, the national culture of the Crimean Tatars, their everyday traditions, language, way of life, system of education and upbringing of children was formed; writing, bookmaking, music, stone and wood carving, ornamental art and especially architecture flourished. The town of Eski Kirim (Old Crimea) is rich in valuable monuments of Muslim architecture with Uzbek and Beybarsa mosques, Kurshum-Jami and Takhtala-Jami, with madrasahs, caravanserais and fountains. There are many monuments of Muslim culture in Bakhchisarai, the former administrative center of the khanate: a palace, mosques, a rich collection of Muslim literature from the Middle Ages. The centers of the Muslim civilization of Crimea were also Karasubazar (Biloghirsk), Kafa (Feodosia), Kezlev (Yevpatoria) with its unique Juma-Jami mosque (1552).

=== Islam on the territory of Ukraine in the 19th and 20th centuries ===
During the rule of the Russian Empire, a consistent policy of destroying the foundations of the Muslim civilization of Crimea was carried out. More than 900 mosques were destroyed or turned into barracks. Shortly after the events in the city of Karasubazar, many Muslim scholars were forcibly summoned and executed. In 1883, the first mass burning of ancient books took place in the Crimea (the second was in 1929).

Despite the systematic oppression, the Muslim culture of Crimea lived on and was even renewed. An example of Muslim culture of the 20th century. became the work of Ismail Gasprinsky. His efforts led to a religious and cultural reform in the Crimea, the result of which was to be a new system of education for Muslims. In 1881, Gasprinsky published the book "Russian Islam", and from 1883 - the weekly magazine "Terjiman" ("Translator"), in which he advocated the ideas of enlightenment among Muslims.

As a result of economic migration during the 19th century. the resettlement of representatives of peoples who traditionally practice Islam in Ukraine begins. Natives from Kazan Tatars settle on Ukrainian lands. The number of displaced persons is measured in tens of thousands. In the industrial belt of Ukraine - in the east and south, a peculiar community of Turko-speaking peoples is forming in Ukraine.

The imperial government allowed Muslims to have their own mosques (but in limited numbers). That is why Muslims often had prayer houses in addition to mosques. So, for example, in Donetsk region at the beginning of the 20th century. two mosques functioned - in the cities of Luhansk and Makiivka, and several more prayer houses in the settlements. In Kiev, the Tatars lived in Podil, Lukyanivka, and Svyatoshyn. On the street The prayer house stood peacefully. In 1910, the foundation of the mosque was laid, which was never built. Kiev was allowed to have 2 Muslim cemeteries. Muslim communities were active in many cities of Ukraine - Katerynoslav, Kharkiv, Zaporizhzhia, Mykolaiv and in others, outside the borders of the Russian Empire - in Lviv.

=== Soviet period ===
Crimean Muslims were subjected to mass deportation in 1944 when Joseph Stalin accused them of collaborating with Nazi Germany. More than 200,000 Crimean Tatars were deported to Central Asia, primarily the Uzbek SSR. It is estimated that more than 100,000 deportees died of starvation or disease due to the deportation.

== Ukrainian Muslims today ==
Sunni Islam of the Hanafi school is the largest non-Christian religion in Ukraine, and the majority of Ukrainian Muslims are Crimean Tatars which is the indigenous people of Ukraine. Other Turkic peoples, predominantly found in South and south-east Ukraine, practice other forms of Islam. These include Volga Tatars, Turks, Azeris, North Caucasian ethnic groups and Uzbeks. The number of ethnic Ukrainians accepting Islam is also growing.

Crimean Roma are Muslims. Today, the Crimean Roma live in different cities of Ukraine and continue to preserve their ancient traditions related to their ancestors who came from Crimea. They still closely intertwine their everyday life and cultural habits with Crimean Tatars. One of the numerous Crimean Roma communities lives in the frontline city of Pavlohrad. Before the Great War, the Pavlohrad Roma community here numbered about 2,500 people.

Non-Turkic peoples also live in Ukraine. These are Arabs, Syrians and Pashtuns.

In 2021, the construction of the Odesa Cathedral Mosque began. The mosque will accommodate more than a thousand believers. The cathedral mosque will resemble the Al-Masjid al-Nabawi mosque in Medina in its architectural form. There will be 2 minarets.

In the city of Kyiv, the construction of the Crimean Tatar cultural center with the Cathedral Mosque, which will be able to accommodate 5,000 people, is planned.

In 2023, President Volodymyr Zelenskyy started a yearly Ukrainian state tradition of official iftar meals during Ramadan.

== Association of Muslims ==
Representatives of the Turkish community also live in Ukraine. In 2012, an estimated population of 1,500,000 Muslims lived in Ukraine.

Islamic organizations have 3 spiritual and administrative centers in the country:

- Spiritual Administration of the Muslims of Crimea (DUMK)
- Spiritual Administration of Muslims of Ukraine (DUMU)
- Spiritual administration of Muslims of Ukraine "Umma" (DUMU "Umma")
- Association of Muslims of Ukraine
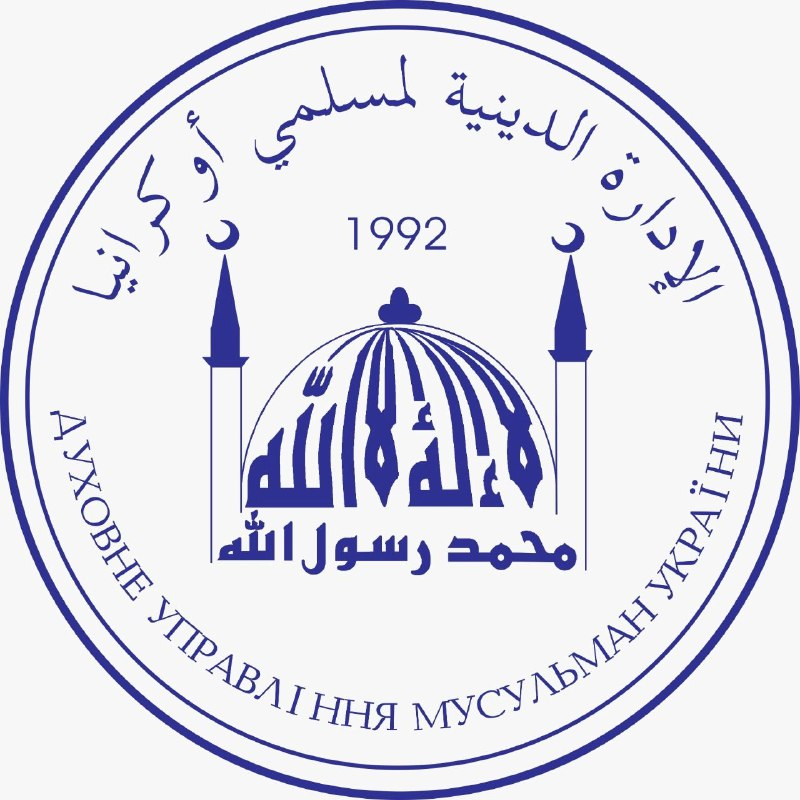
The Religious Administration of Ukrainian Muslims (RAUM)

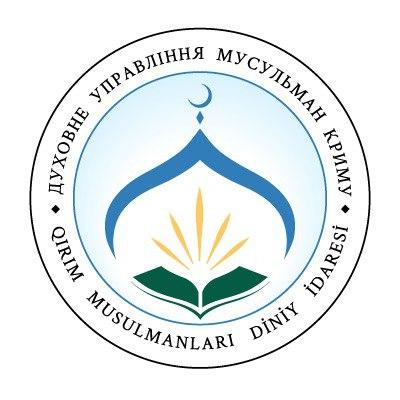
Spiritual administration of the Muslims of Crimea

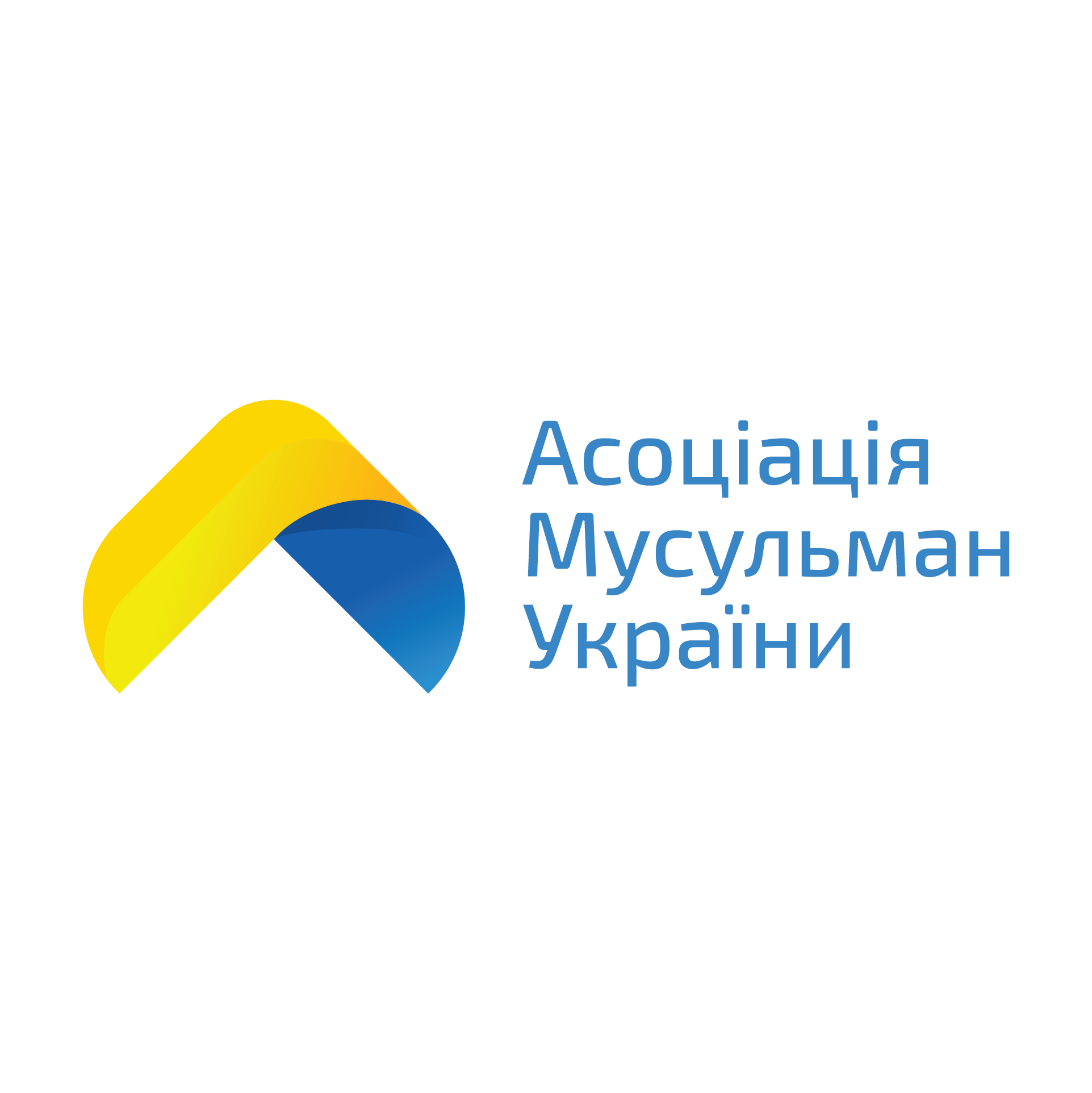
Association of Muslims of Ukraine

== Islamic currents in Ukraine ==
=== Sunni Islam ===
The majority of Muslims in Ukraine are Sunnis.

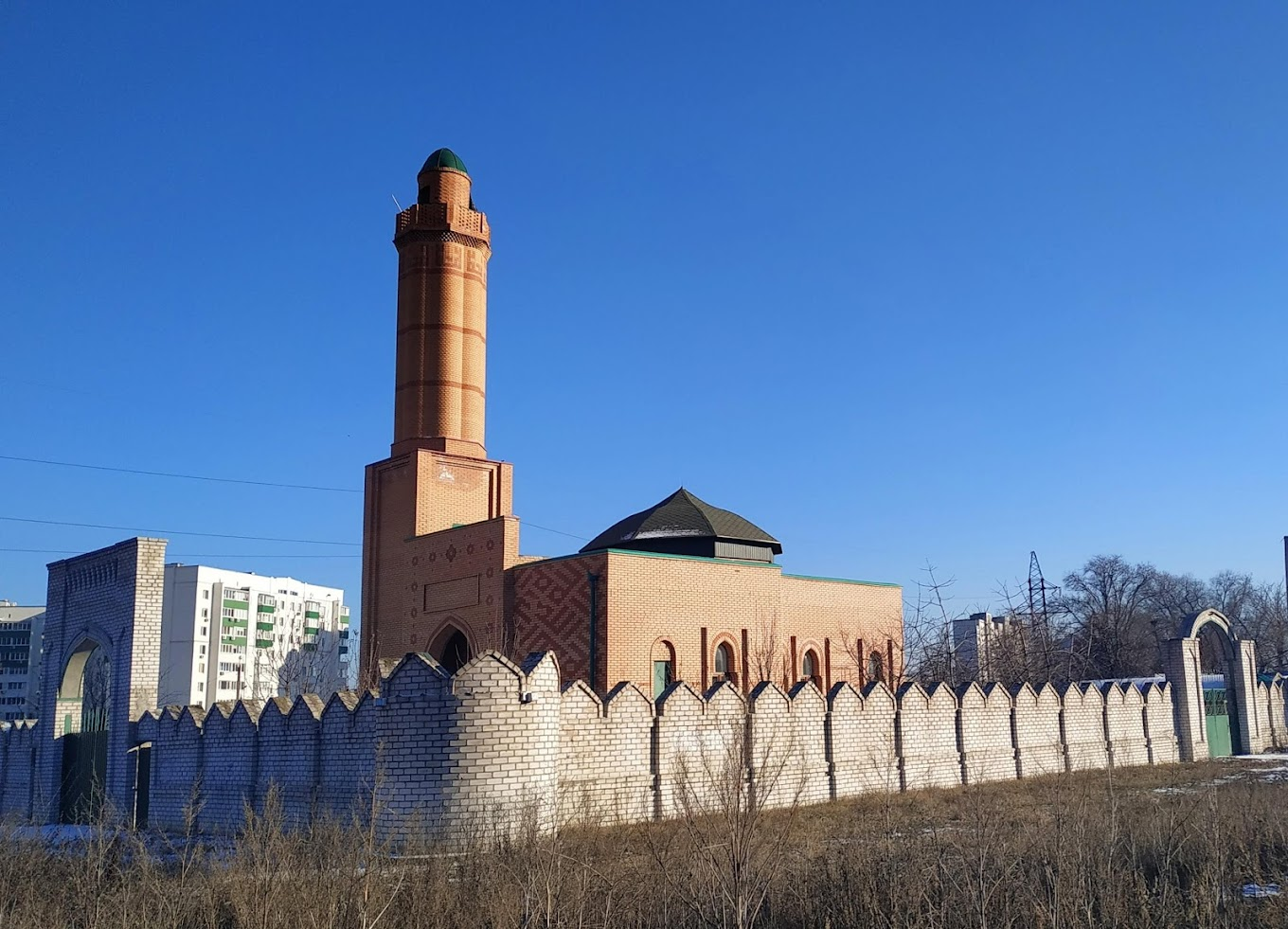
Azerbaijani Shiite mosque of Imam Ali in the city of Kharkiv

=== Shia Islam ===
Shiite Muslims also live in Ukraine. Most of them are Ukrainian Azerbaijanis. Imam Ali mosque operates in the city of Kharkiv and Rasulullah Shia community operates in Kyiv.

=== Salafism ===
The spread of Salafism in Ukraine began in the early 1990s, when Saudi Arabia allocated funds for the construction of mosques for the Crimean Tatars. Crimean Salafists are the opposition to the Spiritual Administration of the Muslims of Crimea.

Among the Salafis of Ukraine are Arabs, Crimean Tatars. The "Sunna" mosque operates in the city of Kharkiv, which adheres to Salafism.

Others

About 1,500 Crimean Tatars are supporters of the Islamic fundamentalist organization Hizb ut-Tahrir. The head of the Information Office of Hizb ut-Tahrir in Ukraine is Fazil Amzayev.

== Population ==
Muslims in Ukraine have 445 communities, 433 ministers, and 160 mosques, with many more mosques currently being built.

Estimates of the Ukrainian Muslim population vary. According to the US Department of State, Muslims made up 0.9% of the Ukrainian population in 2010, while other sources estimate 1 Million Muslims or 2% of the population, but as much as 15% in Crimea. According to the 2000 census Ukraine was home to 248,193 Crimean Tatars, 73,304 Volga Tatars, 45,176 Azeris, 12,353 Uzbeks, 8,844 Turks, 6,575 Arabs, 2,100 Kurds and 5,526 Kazakhs. Also, according to current data, more than 20,000 Afghans live in Ukraine.

The 2012 Freedom Report estimated a Muslim population of 500,000 in Ukraine, including 300,000 Crimean Tatars. A 2011 Pew Forum study estimated a Ukrainian Muslim population of 393,000, but the Clerical Board of Ukraine's Muslims claimed there were two million Muslims in Ukraine as of 2009. According to Said Ismagilov, the mufti of Ummah, in February 2016 one million Muslims lived in Ukraine.

As of 2016, due to the 2014 Russian annexation of Crimea and the War in Donbas, 750,000 Muslims (including half-million Crimean Tatars) are living in territory no longer controlled by Ukraine. (According to figures as stated by Said Ismagilov, the mufti of Religious Administration of Muslims of Ukraine "DUMU".)

== Prominent Muslims of Ukraine ==
=== Politicians ===
- Jafer Seydamet Kyrymer is a Crimean Tatar writer, public figure, one of the leaders and ideologists of the national liberation movement of the Crimean Tatars.
- Mustafa Dzhemilev is a political and public figure of Ukraine of Crimean Tatar origin, one of the leaders of the Crimean Tatar national movement, People's Deputy of Ukraine.
- Rustem Umerov - former Minister of Defense of Ukraine.
- Refat Chubarov is a Ukrainian Crimean Tatar politician and public figure. Head of the Mejlis of the Crimean Tatar people.
- Emine Dzhaparova - the First Deputy Minister of Foreign Affairs of Ukraine.
- Tamila Tasheva - Permanent Representative of the President of Ukraine in the Autonomous Republic of Crimea.

=== Actors, singers ===
- Akhtem Seitablaev is a Ukrainian actor and director of Crimean Tatar origin.
- Jamala is a Ukrainian singer of Crimean Tatar origin, People's Artist of Ukraine.
- Nariman Aliev — Ukrainian director and screenwriter.

=== Religious figures ===
- Noman Çelebicihan - the first mufti of the Muslims of Crimea, one of the organizers of the first Qurultay.
- Ahmed Tamim - mufti of the Spiritual Administration of Muslims of Ukraine.
- Ayder Rustemov - mufti of the Spiritual Administration of the Muslims of Crimea
- Murat Suleymanov - Mufti of the Spiritual Administration of Muslims of Ukraine "Umma" since 2022.
- Said Ismagilov - Mufti of the Spiritual Administration of Muslims of Ukraine "Umma" (until 2022). President of the NGO "Ukrainian Center for Islamic Studies".

=== Military figures ===
- Amina Okuyeva (1983–2017) was a Ukrainian doctor-surgeon, public activist and military officer.

=== Businessmen ===
- Rinat Akhmetov - Ukrainian oligarch
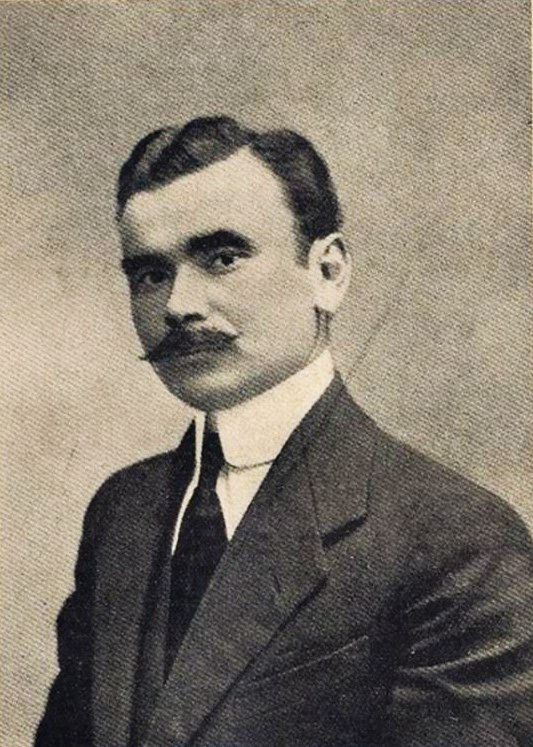
Noman Çelebicihan

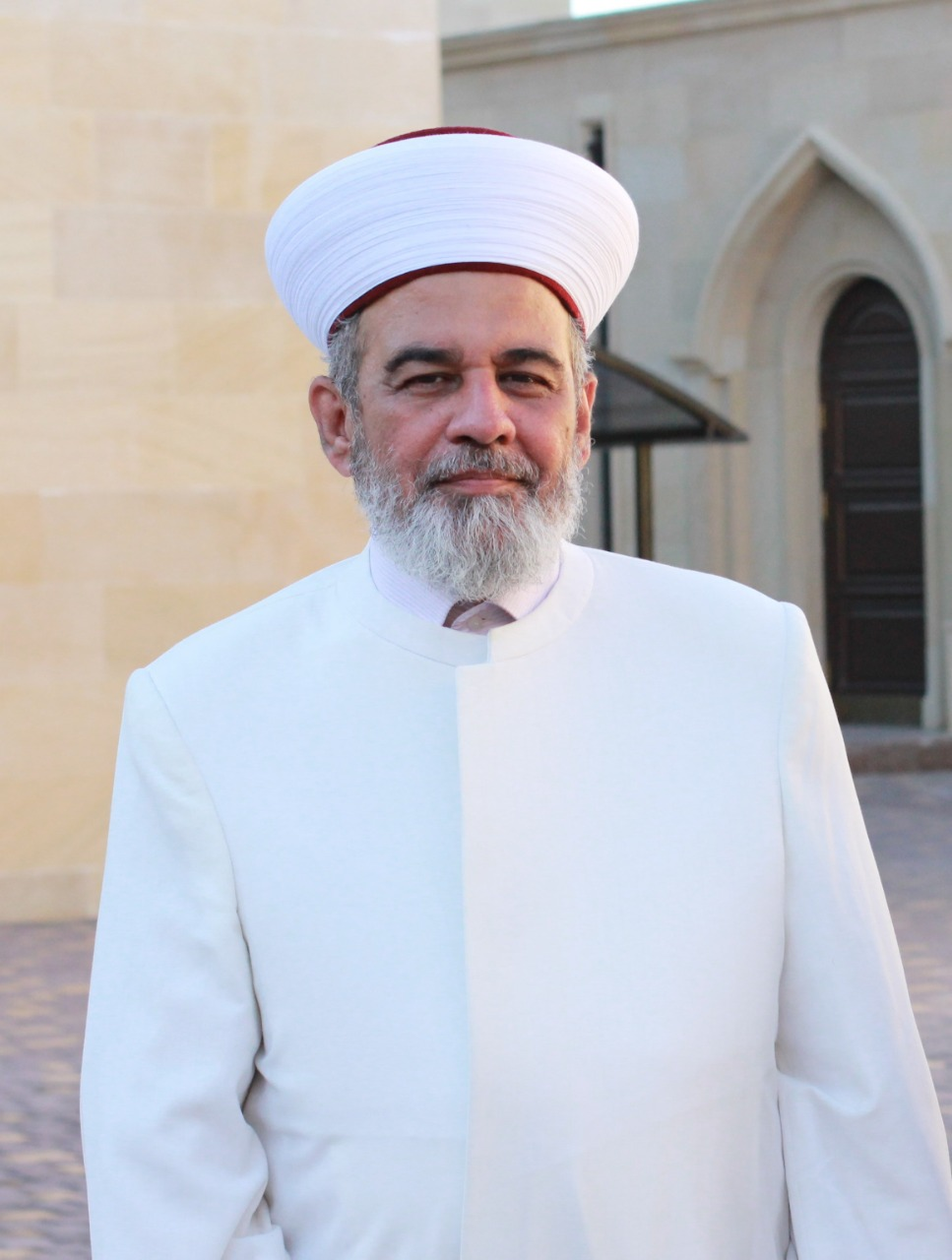
Ahmed Tamim, Mufti of the Spiritual Administration of Muslims of Ukraine

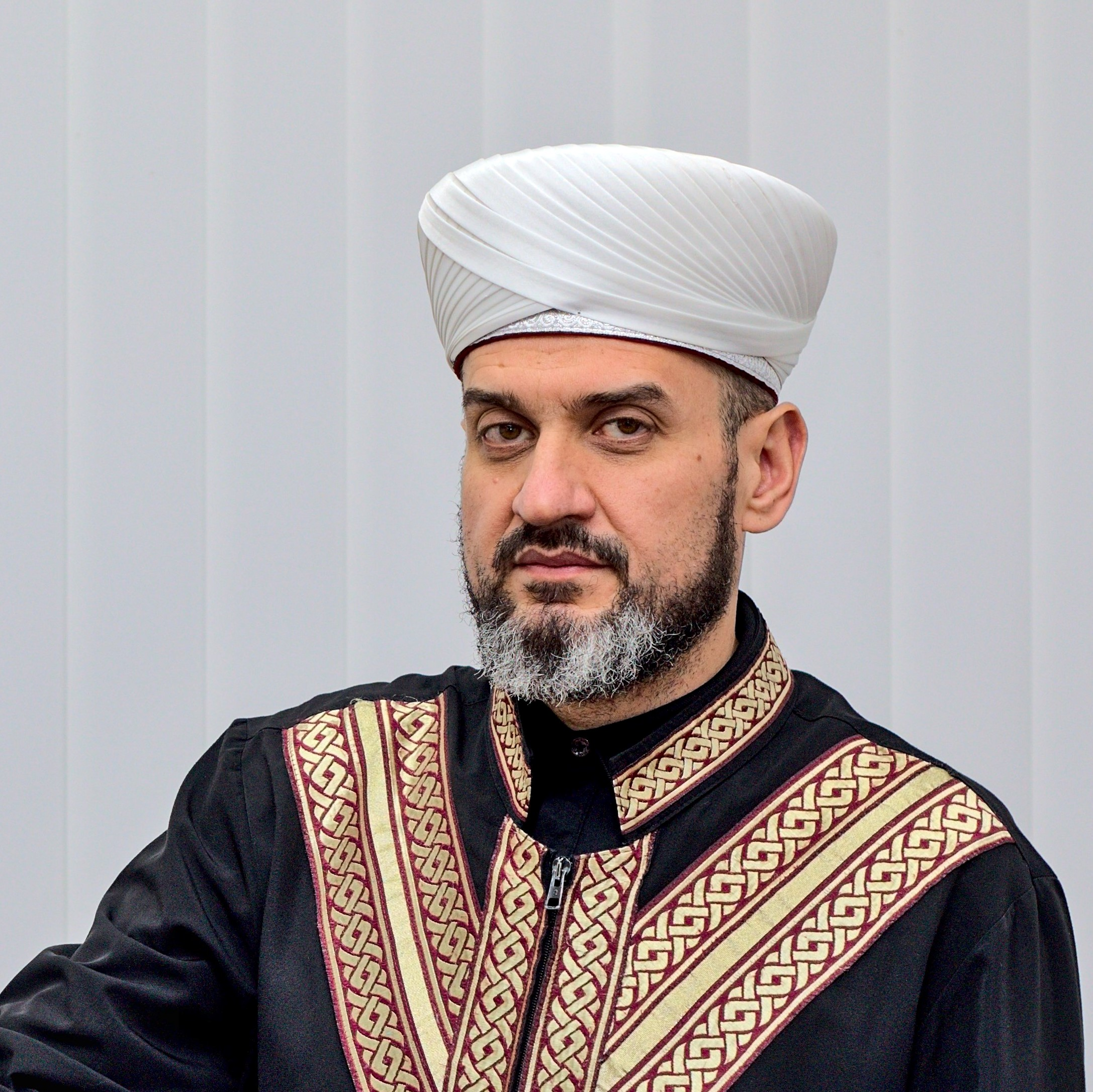
Ayder Rustemov, Mufti of the Spiritual Administration of the Muslims of Crimea

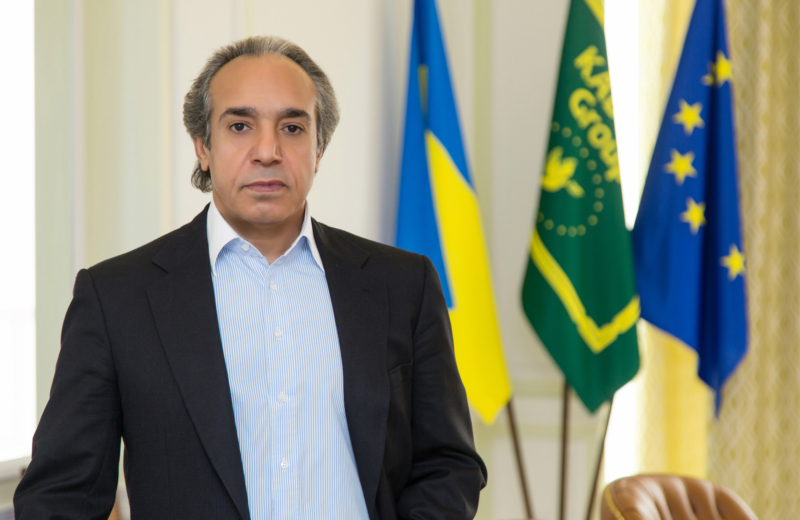
Kivan Adnan

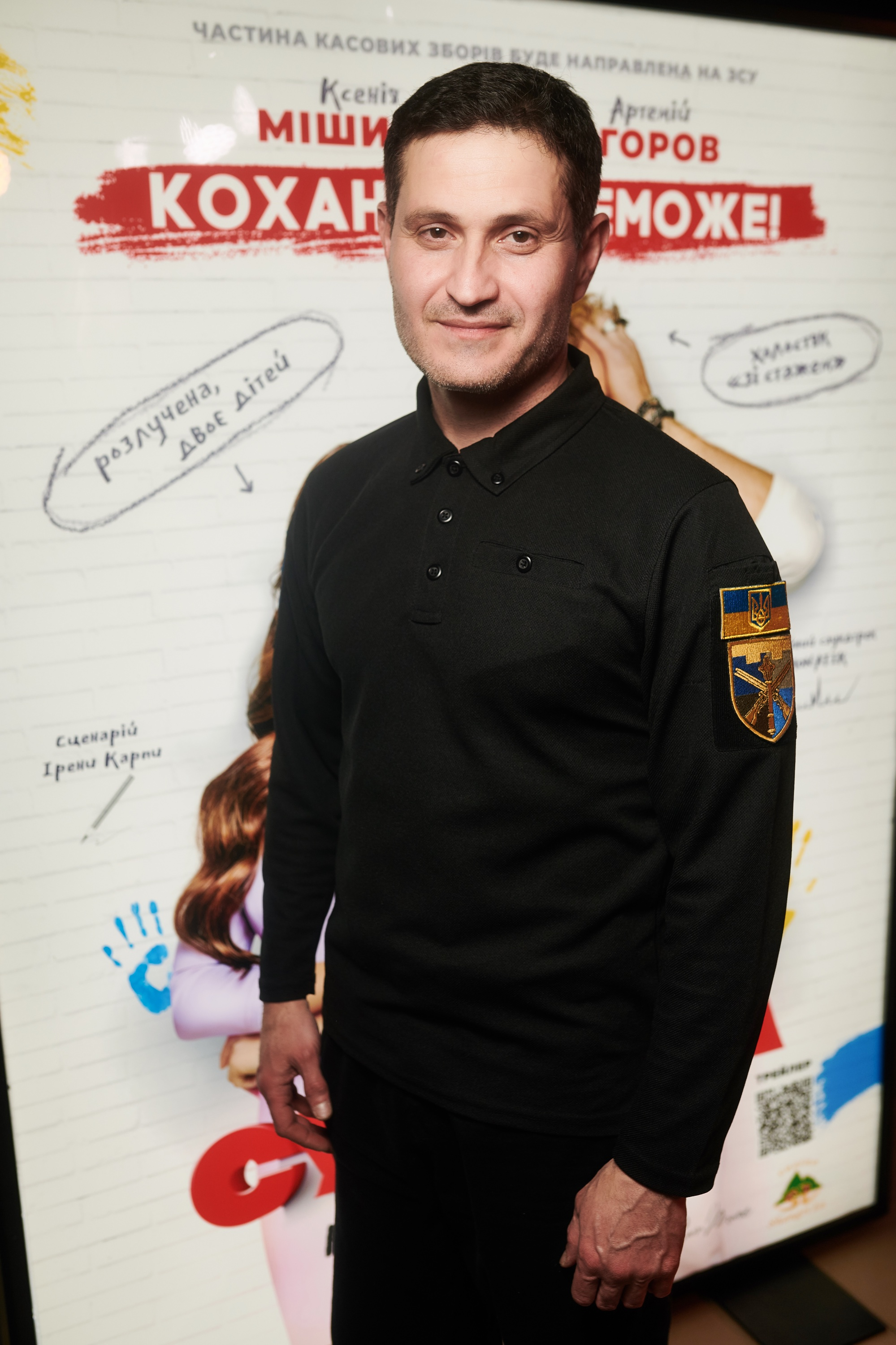
Akhtem Seitablayev

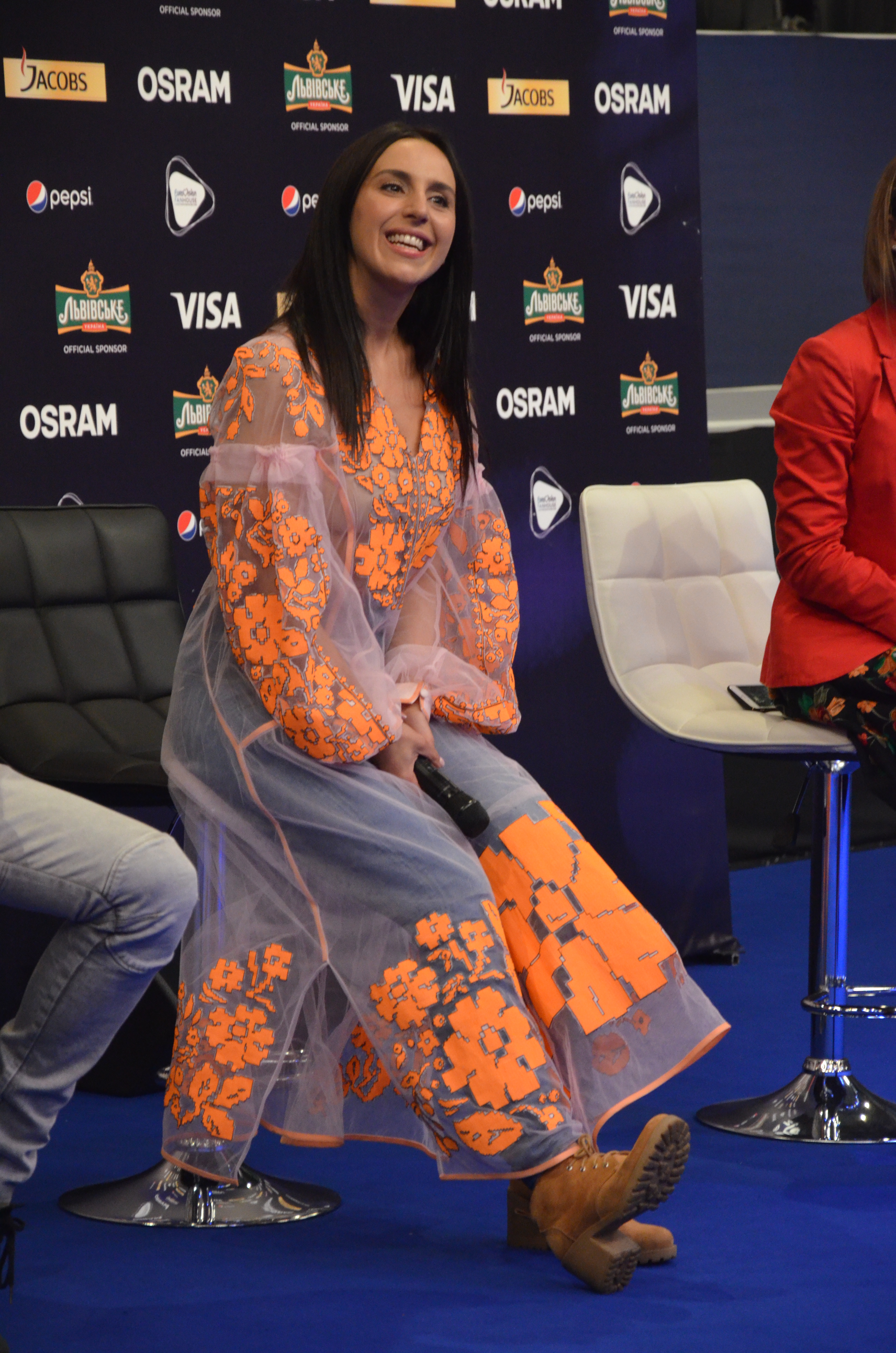
Jamala (Susana Jamaladinova)

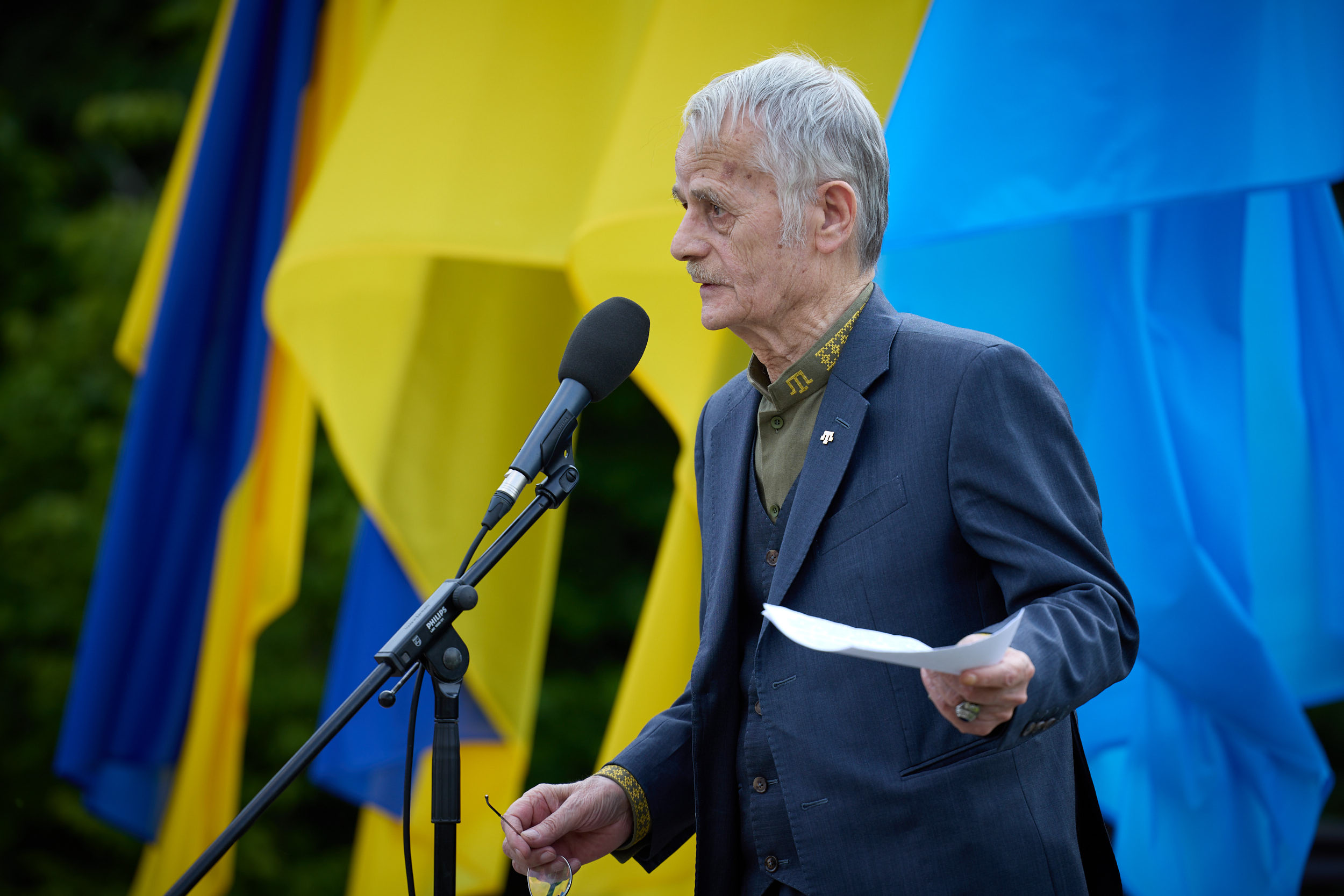
Mustafa Dzhemilev

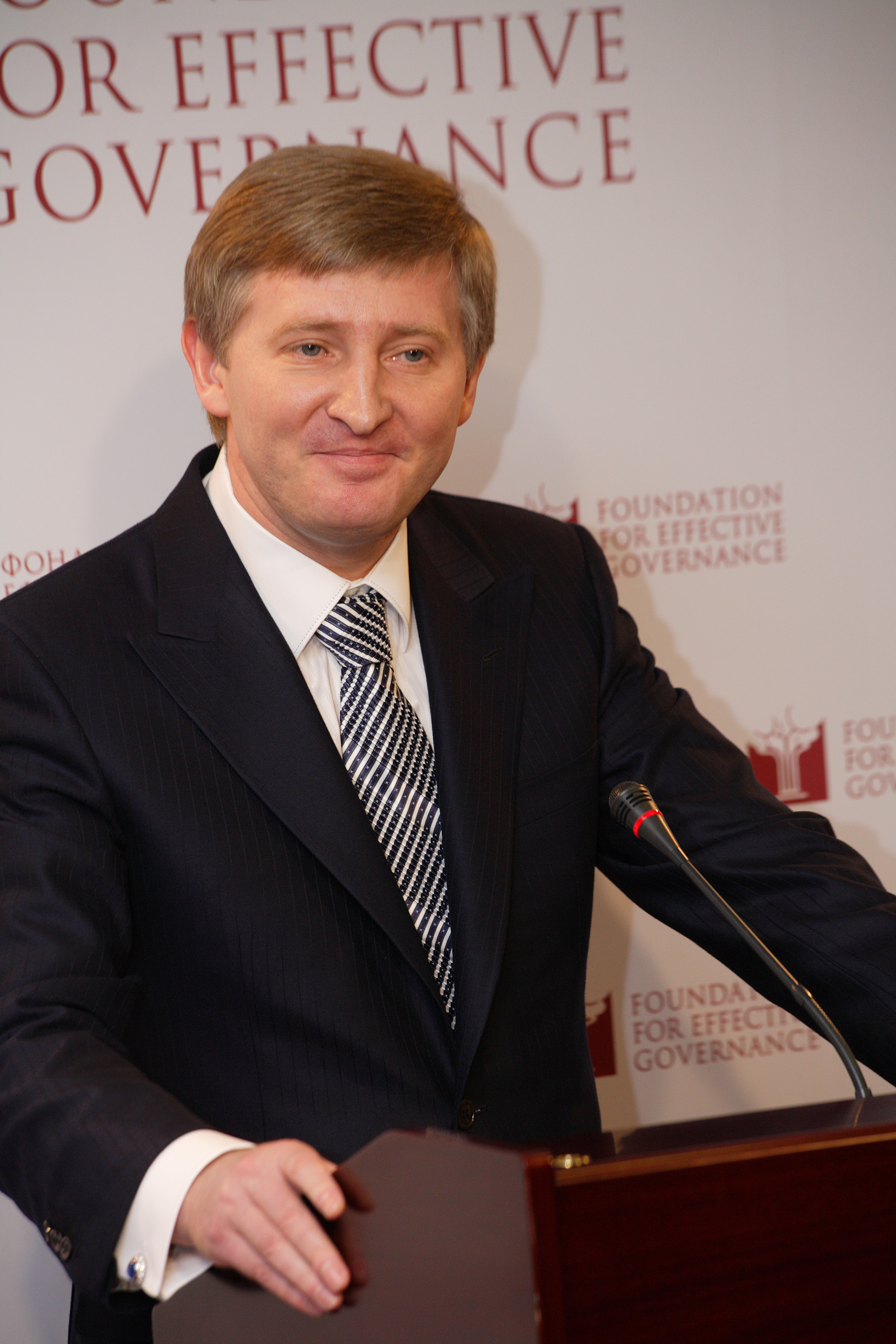
Rinat Akhmetov

== Gallery ==
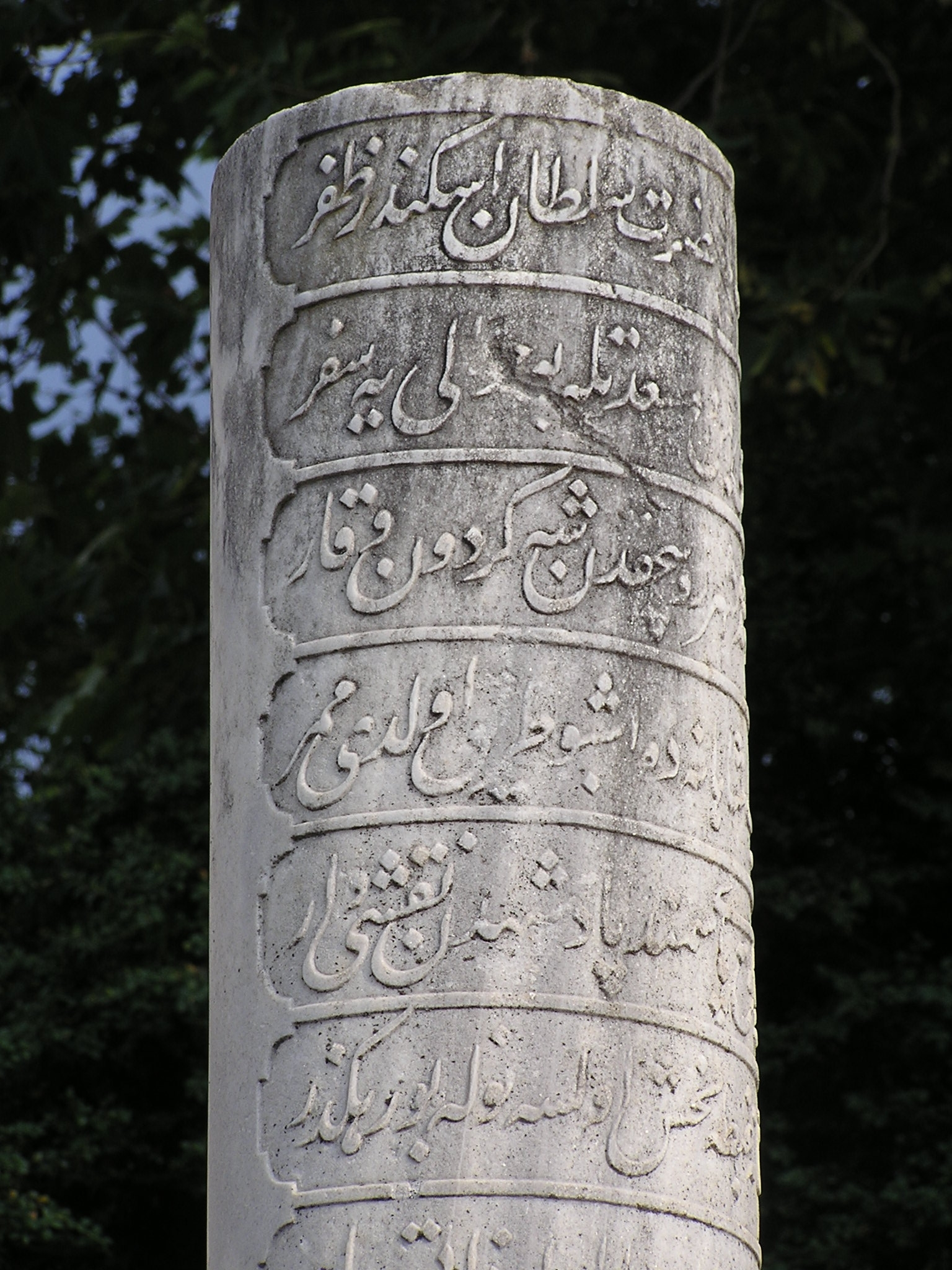
Ancient Column with Persian inscription, at the Livadiya Palace in Yalta, Crimea, Ukraine.

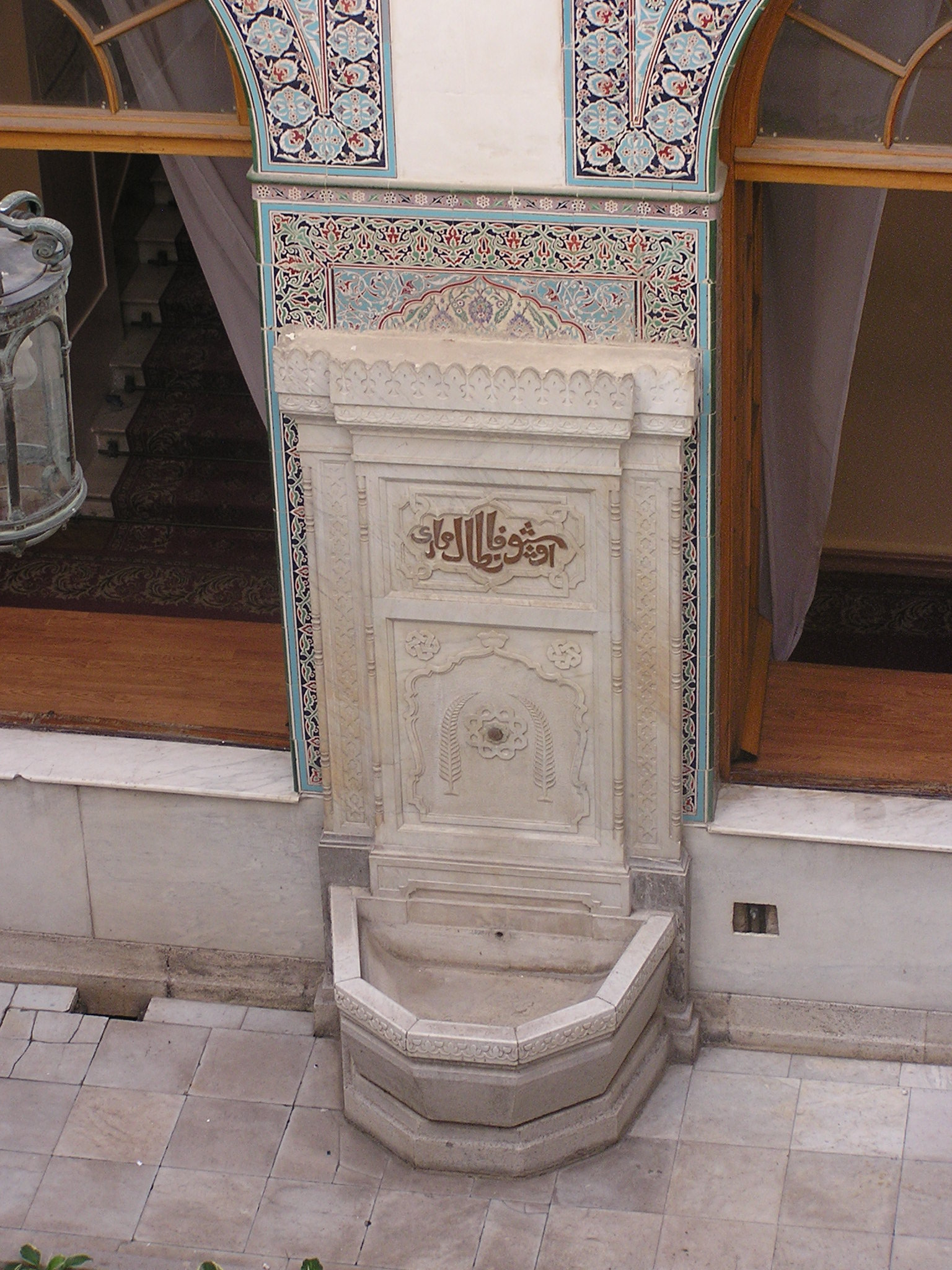
Crimean Tatar patio and garden courtyard, at the Livadiya Palace, Crimea, Ukraine.

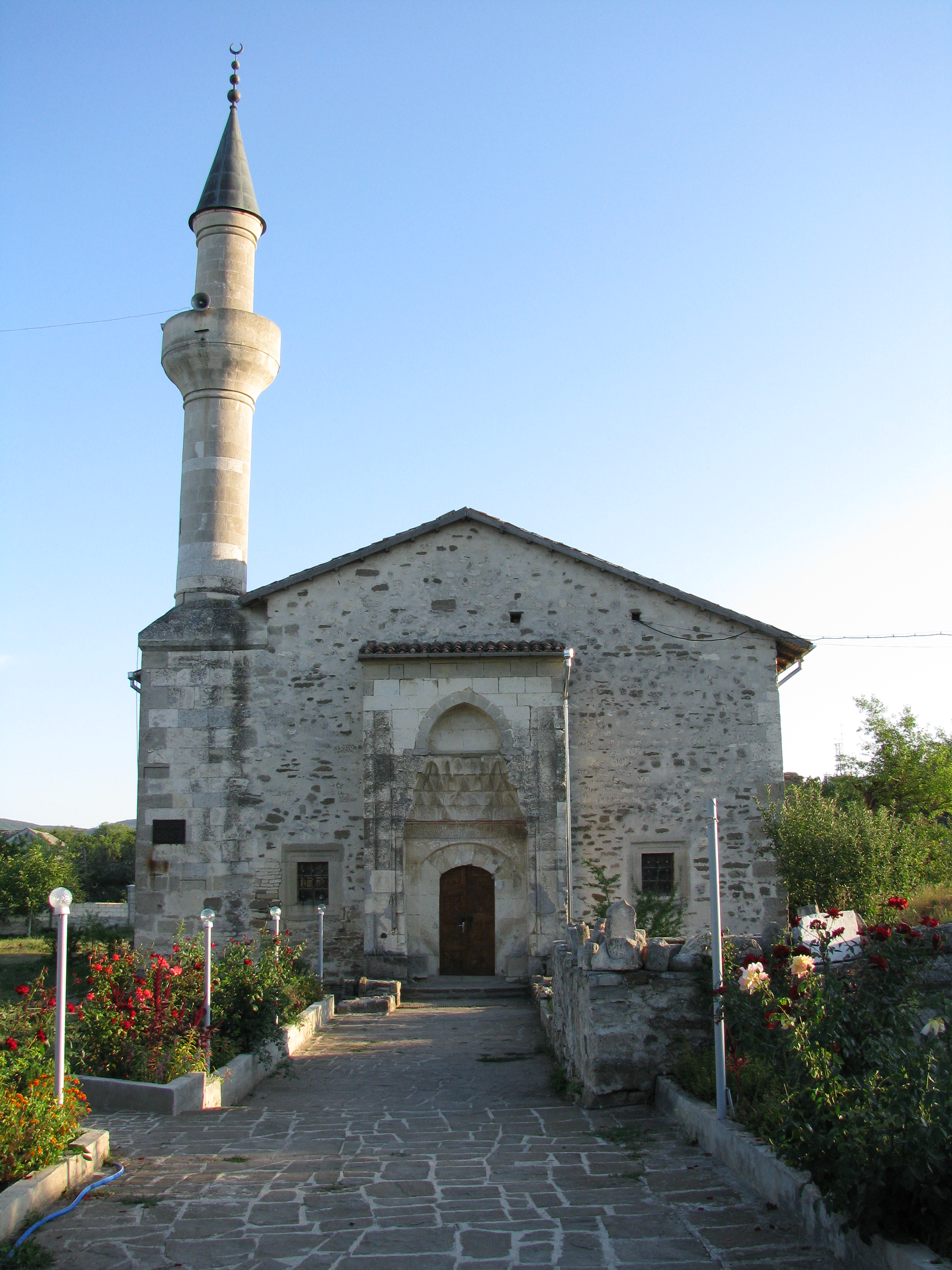
Ozbek Han Mosque

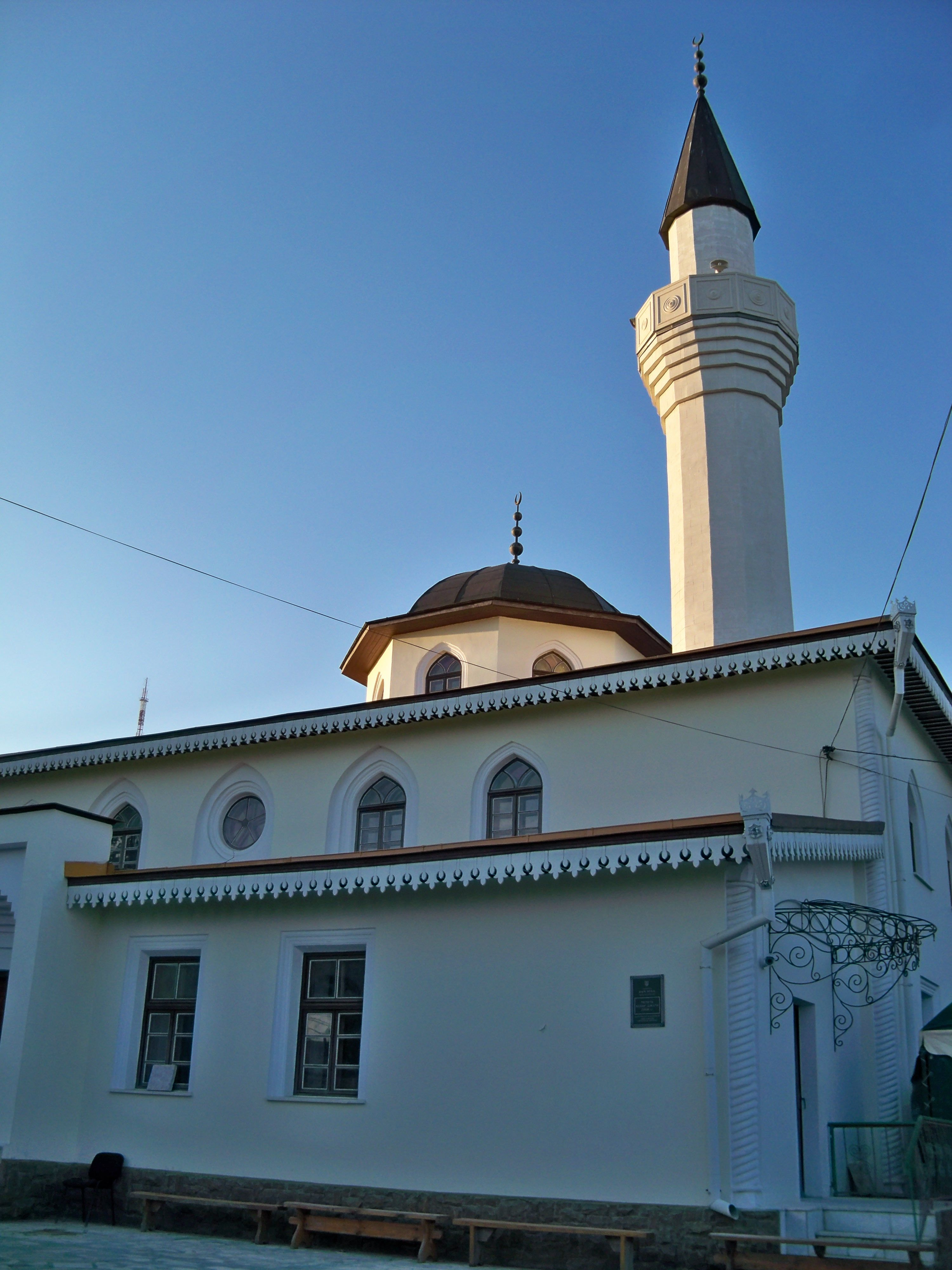
Kebir Jami Mosque in the city of Simferopol

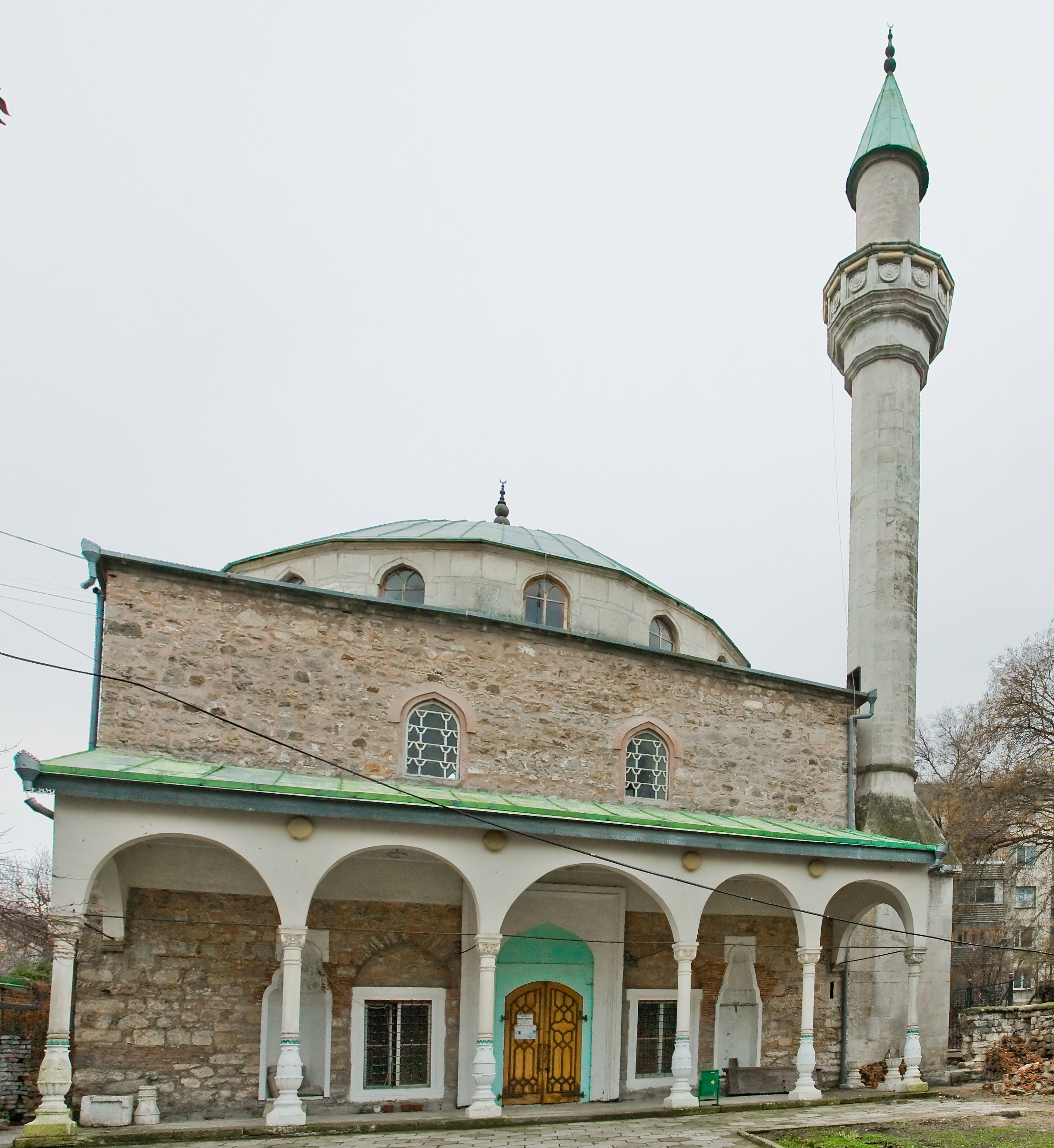
Mufti Jami in the city of Feodosia

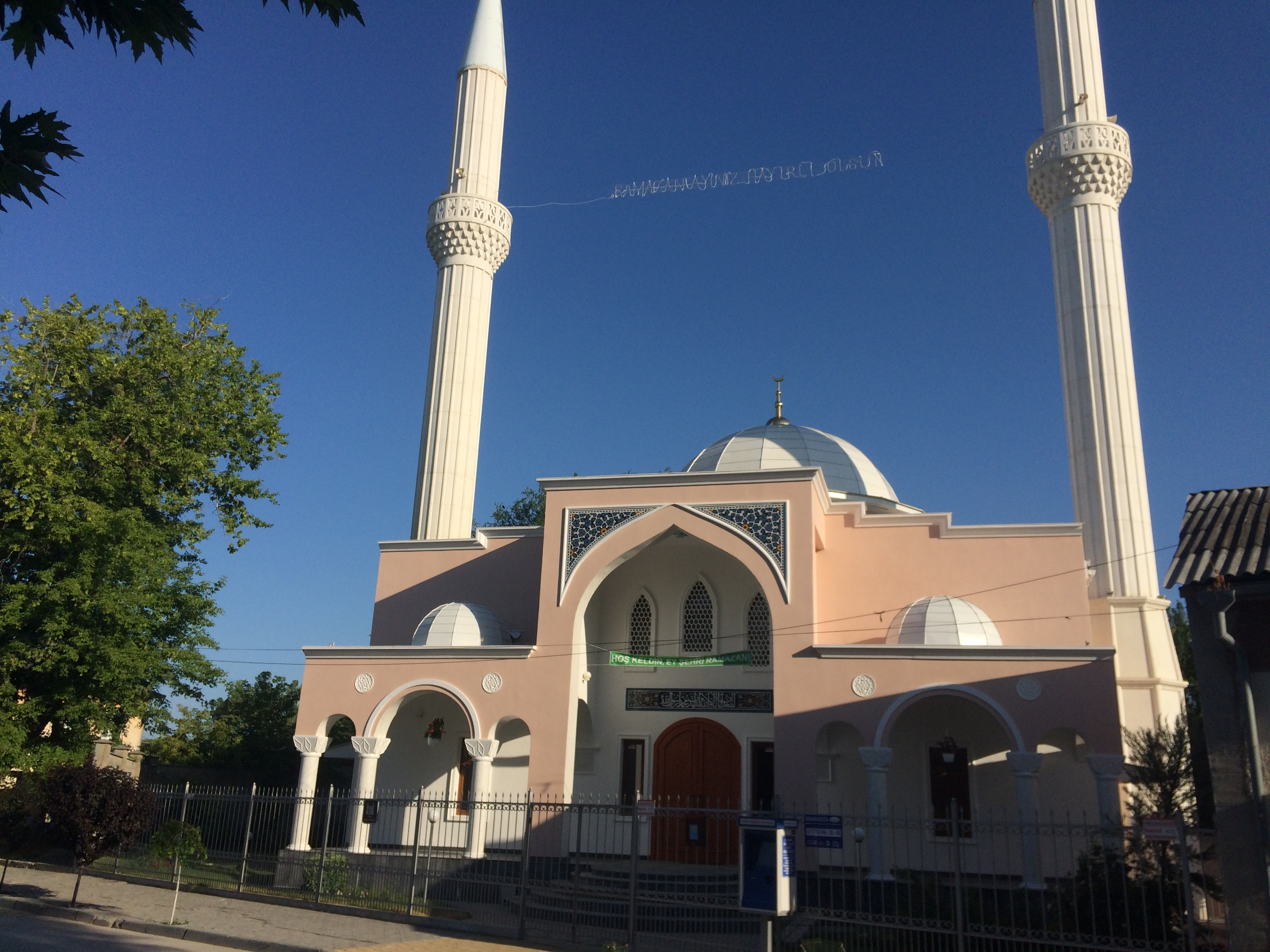
Refat Veliulla Jami in the city of Bilohirsk

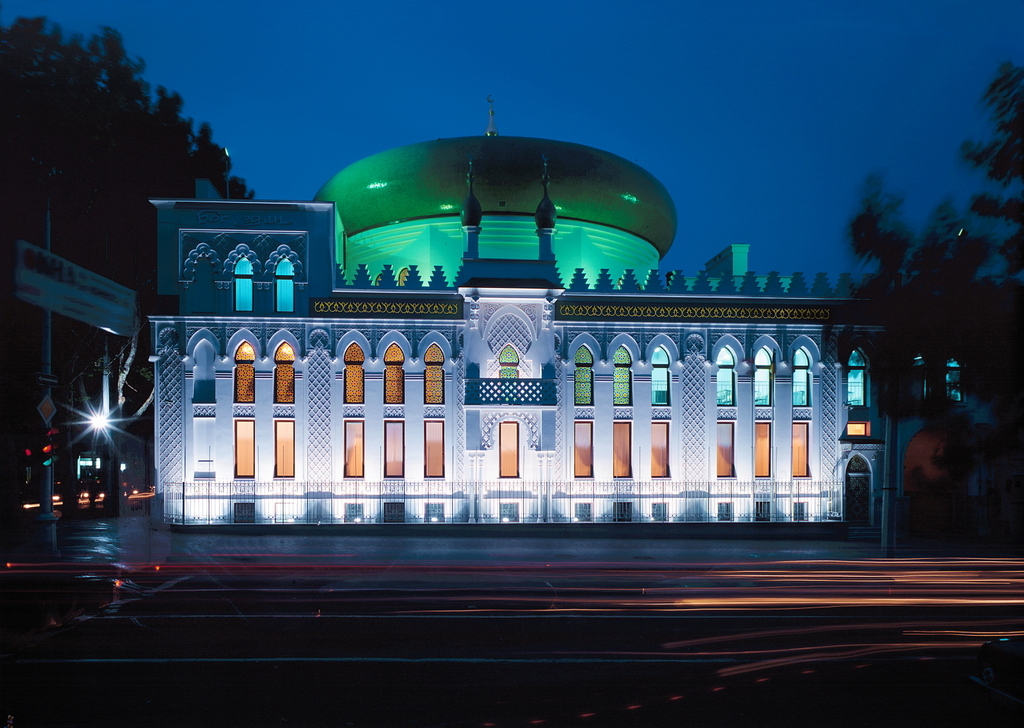
Arab cultural center in the city of Odesa

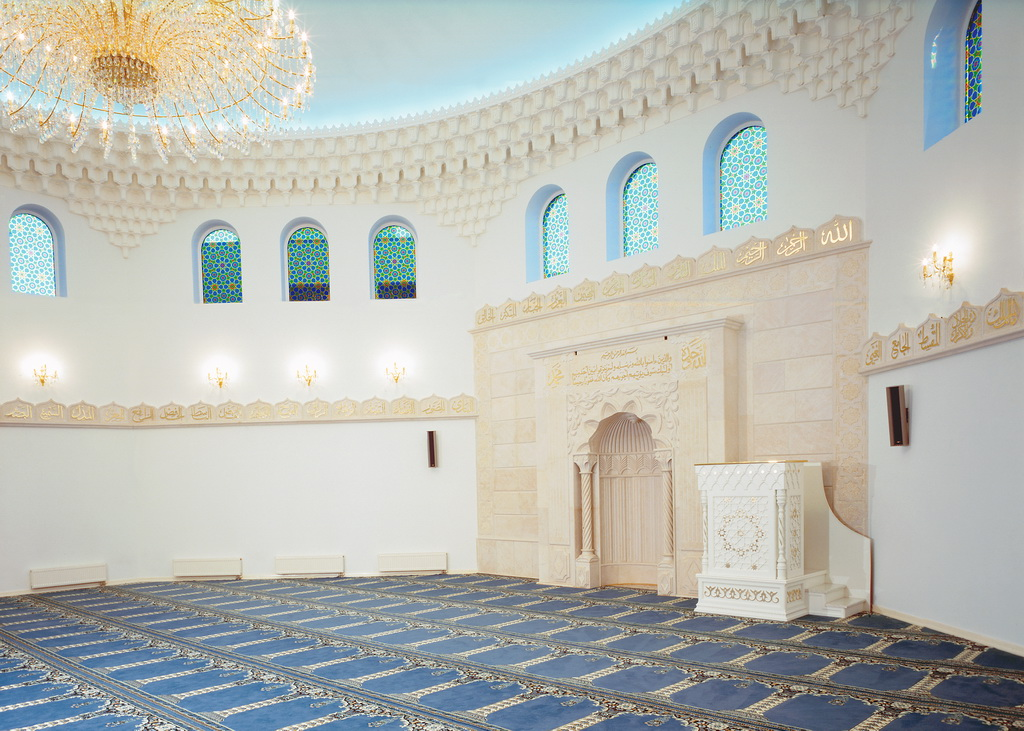
Arab cultural center in the city of Odesa

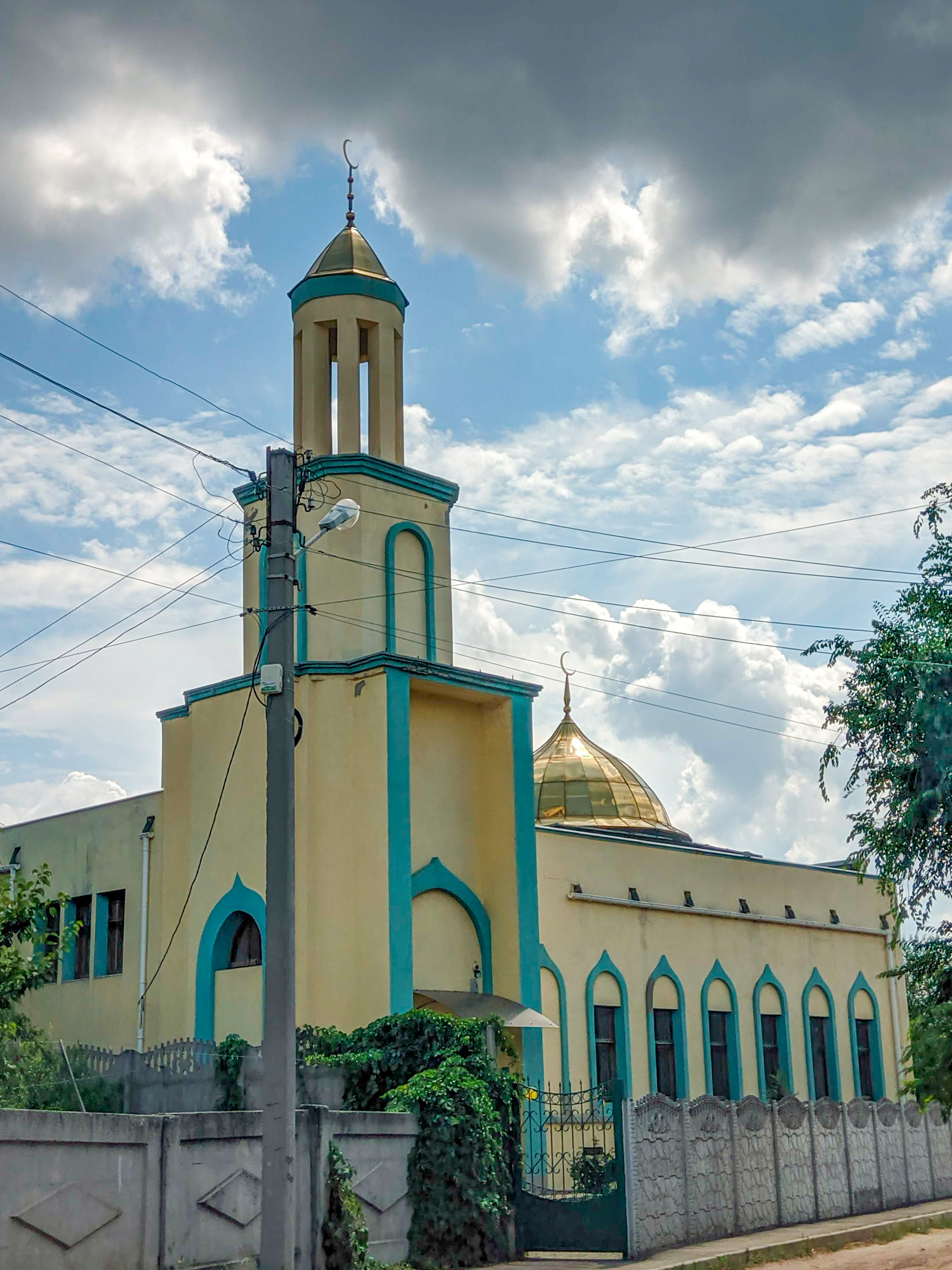
Kharkiv Cathedral Mosque

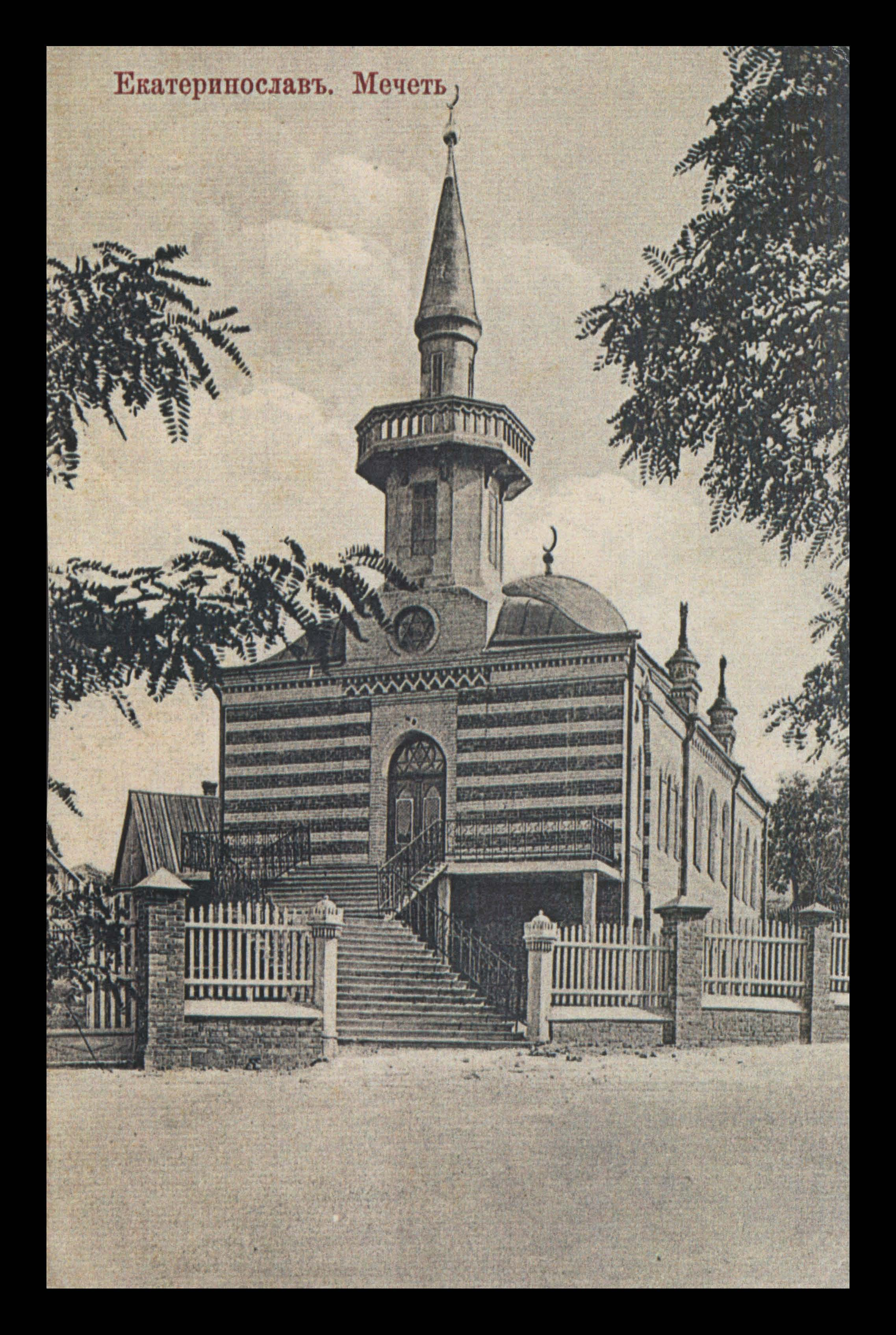
Dnipro cathedral mosque. It is in a state of reconstruction

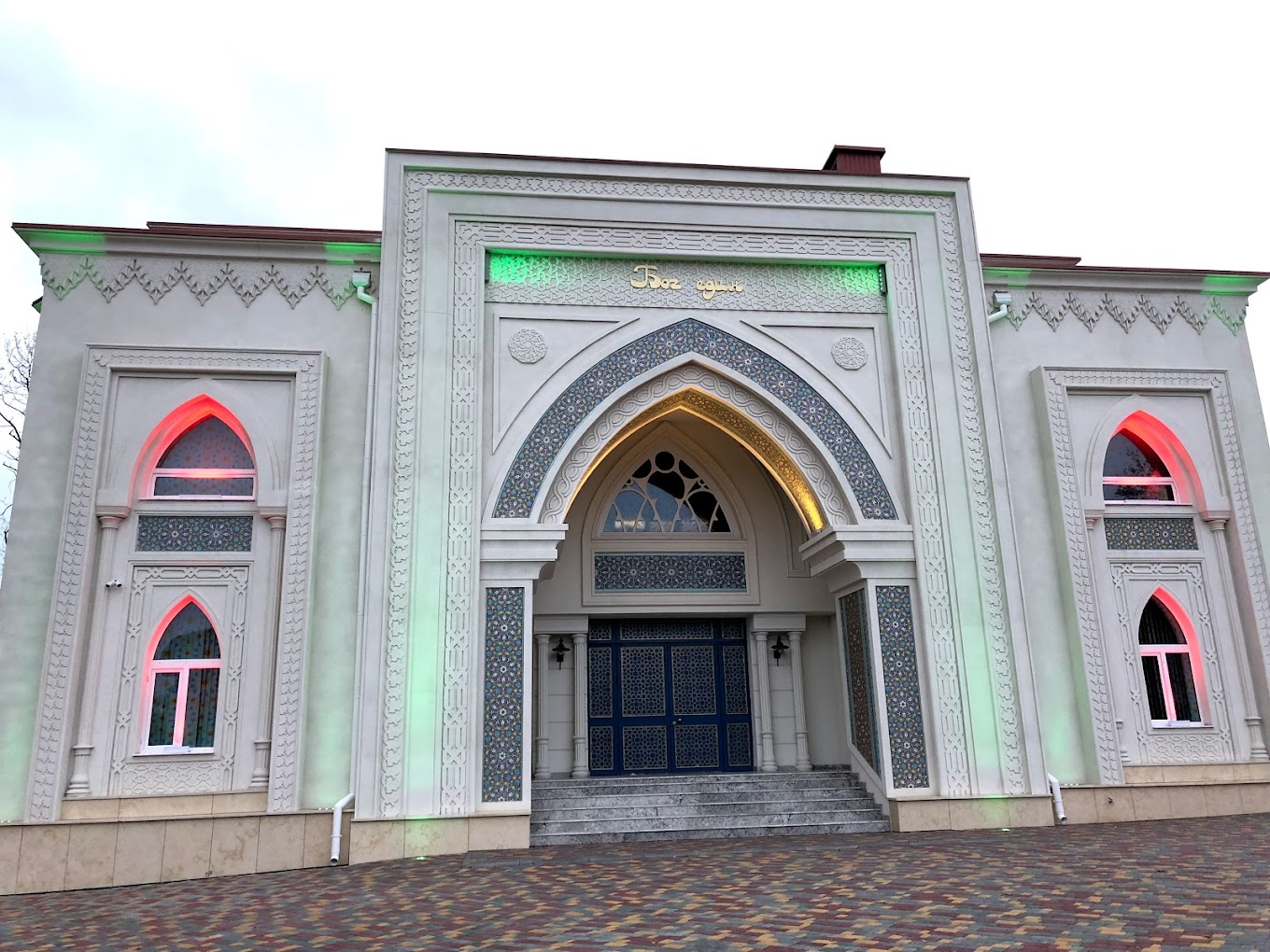
Eastern Cultural Center and Mosque named after Ahmed Suleiman Kivan in Odesa

== See also ==
- Religion in Ukraine
