= Ar-Rahma Mosque, Kyiv =

Mosque in Kyiv, Ukraine

Ar-Rahma Mosque
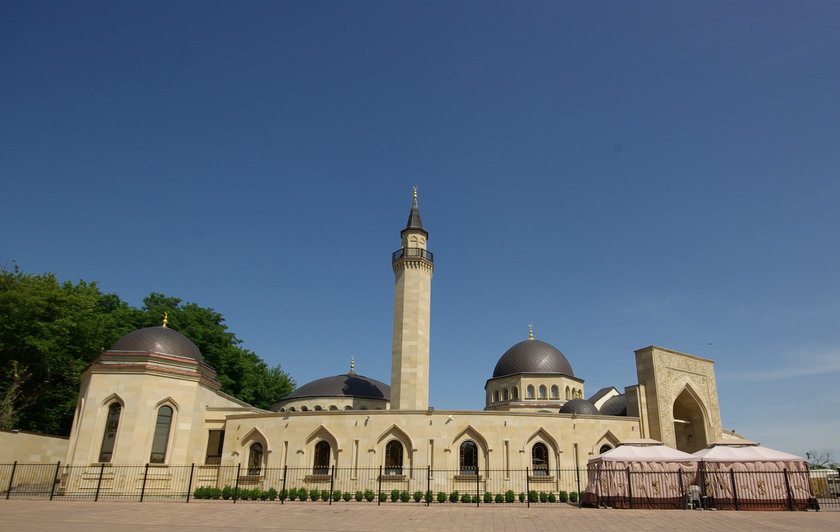

Religion
- Affiliation: Islam
- District: Kyiv Oblast
- Status: Active

Location
- Location: 46 Luk’yanivs’ka str., Kyiv
- Interactive map of Ar-Rahma Mosque
- Territory: Ukraine
- Coordinates: 50°27′54″N 30°29′59″E

Architecture
- Architect: Alexander Komorowski
- Type: Mosque
- Completed: 2011

Specifications
- Capacity: 3,000
- Dome: 1
- Minaret: 1
- Minaret height: 27 meters

Website
- http://www.islamyat.org/

The Ar-Rahma Mosque, (Ukrainian: Мечеть Ар-Рахма), translated Mercy Mosque, is a mosque in Kyiv, the capital of Ukraine. It was built between the years 1996 and 2000 in the Tatarka neighborhood of the city.

== History ==
The first attempt to build a mosque in Kyiv was in 1897. Muslims of that time were able to open a house of worship in Kyiv on 5 Peace Street, in the house of Kalinovich in Podil. The next attempt to build a mosque was made in 1991.

Ordinance on the allocation of the Clerical Board of Ukraine's Muslims' (DUMU) land for the construction and maintenance of the memorial building was granted on February 5, 1996, by the Kyiv state administration. Construction of the mosque took place in stages, with money donated by Muslims of the city. Prayers on Fridays, holidays, and special events started upon the completion of the first part of the mosque in 1998.

In 2000, a crescent moon was installed on the dome of the new mosque. The mosque was finally opened in 2011.

== See also ==
- Islam in Ukraine
