= Clerical Board of Ukraine's Muslims =

Islamic organization based in Ukraine

- Духовне управління мусульман України
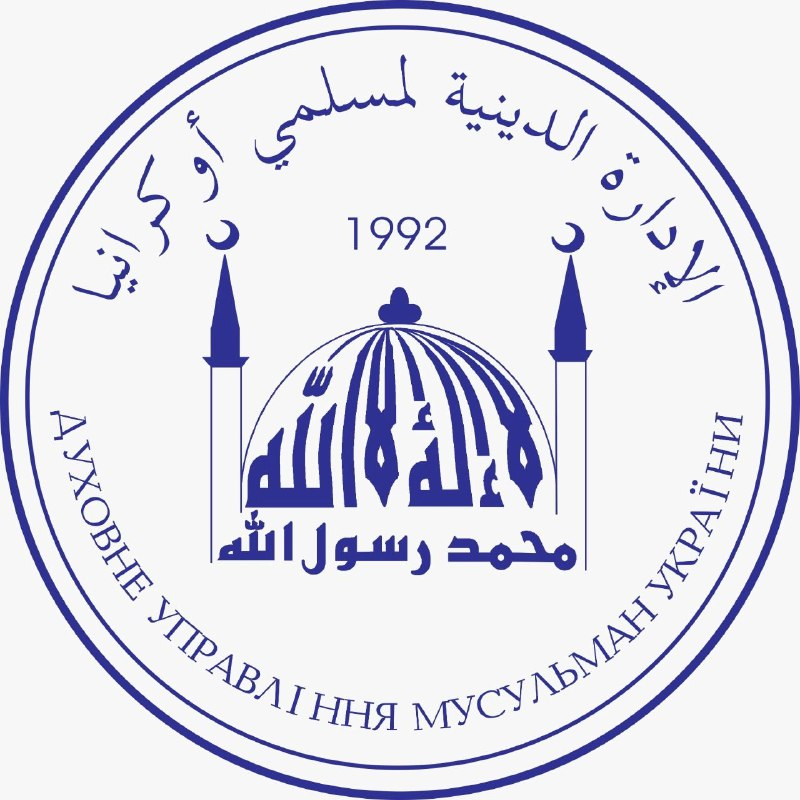
- Abbreviation: DUMU
- Formation: 1992
- Founded at: Kyiv
- Type: Religious organization
- Headquarters: Ukraine

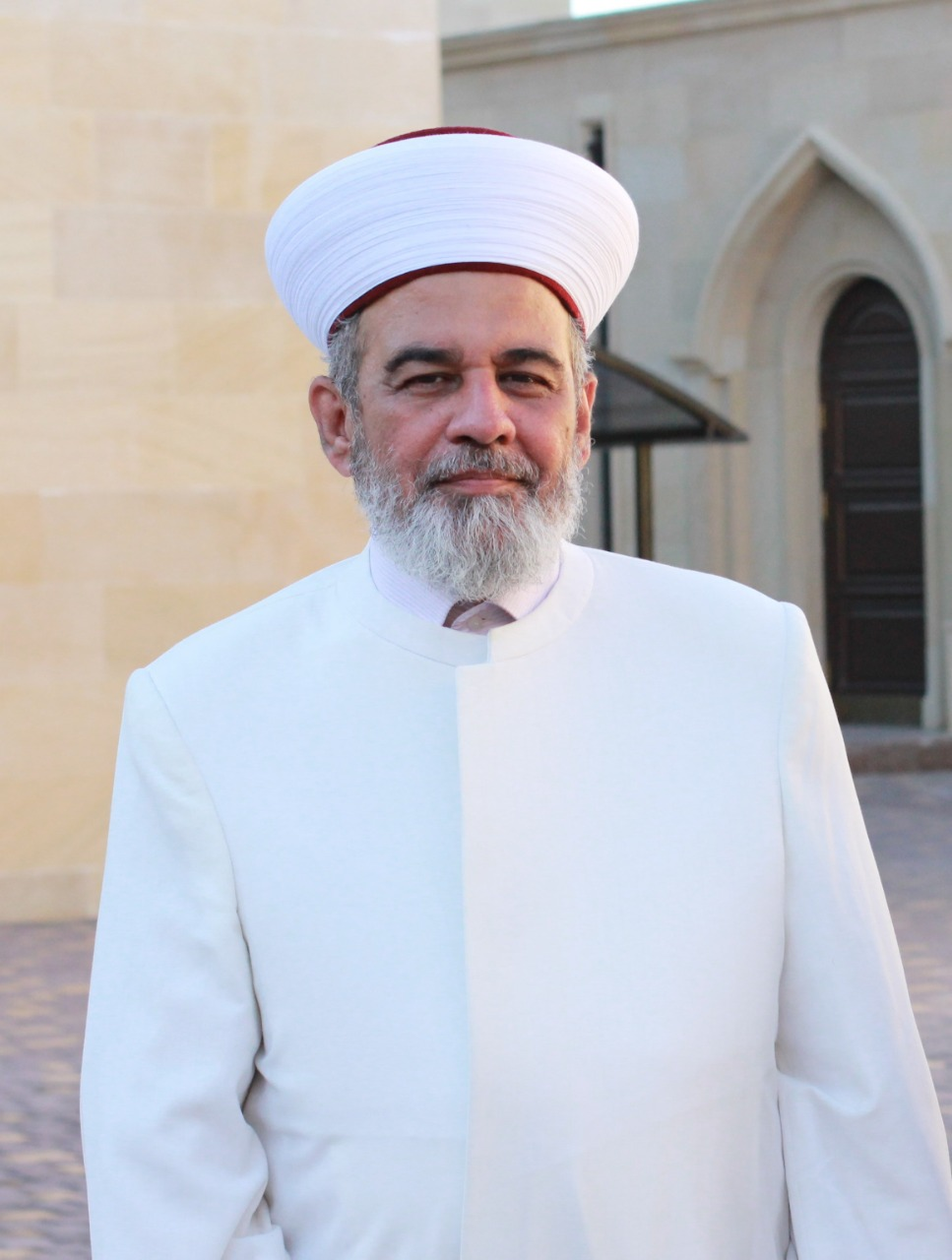
Aḥmad Tamīm

The Clerical Board of Ukraine's Muslims (DUMU; Ukrainian: Духовне управління мусульман України, romanized: Dukhovne upravlinnia musulman Ukrayiny) is a large Muslim religious organization in Ukraine established in 1992 in Kyiv. In the aftermath of the collapse of the Soviet Union, the minority Muslim community sought measures to organize itself to be properly represented in the new free Ukrainian society. In 1994, DUMU's first congress was held and its political structure was organized. Tamin Achmed Mohammed Mutach was elected as its first president. Muslims of all ethnic groups and clans were invited to become its members. Currently it is the second largest Muslim Community represented in Ukraine. DUMU has offices in 10 regions of Ukraine. It runs the Islamic institute in Kyiv, and publishes a Ukrainian language daily Minaret.

DUMU managed to construct the Ar-Rahma Mosque in Kyiv, the first purpose-built mosque in the city's history.

== See also ==
- Religious Administration of Muslims of Ukraine
