= Said Ismagilov =

Ukrainian mufti (born 1978)

- Ukrainian: Cергій Валерійович Ісмагілов
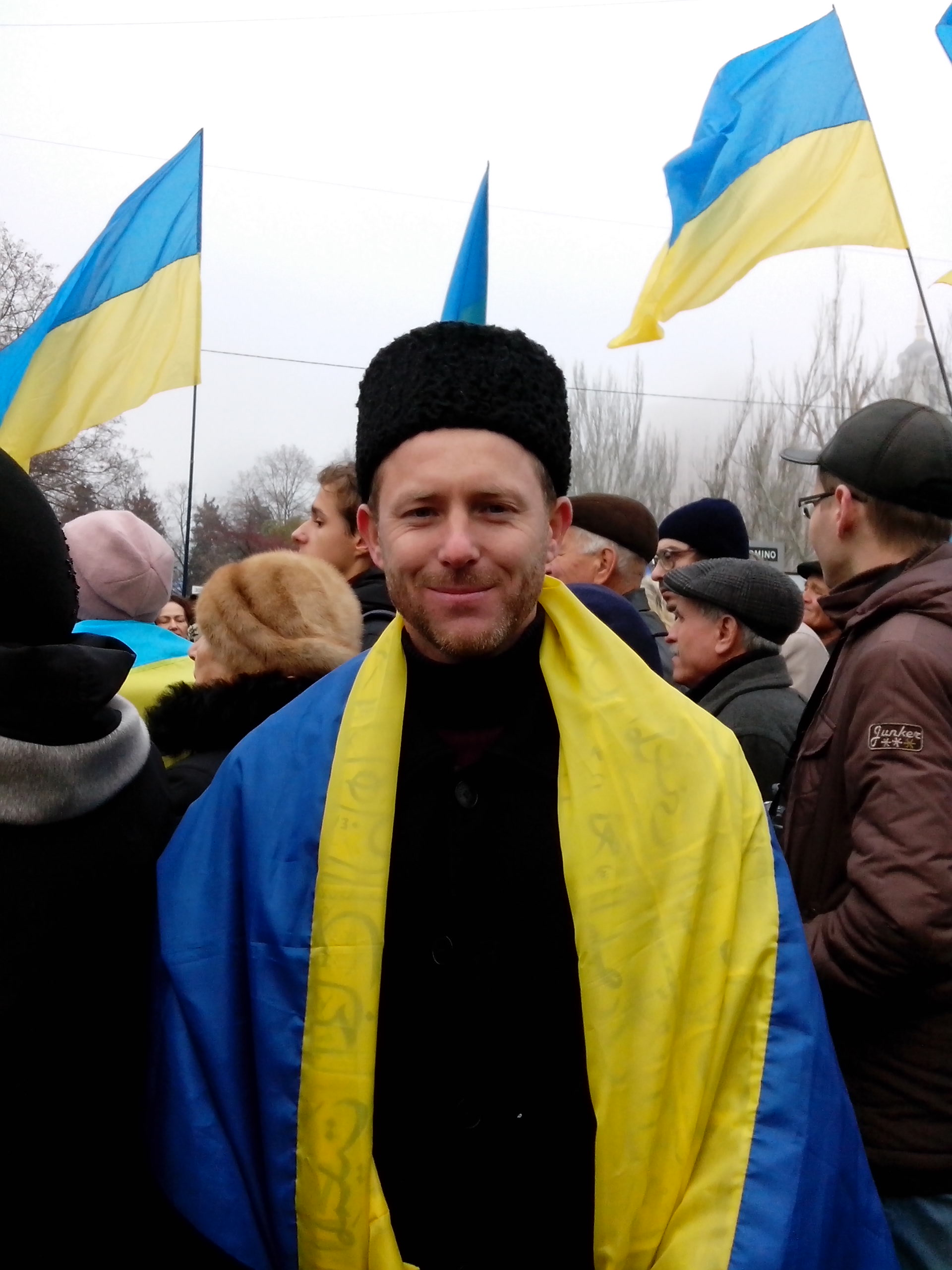
- Born: 9 August 1978 (age 47); Donetsk, Ukrainian SSR
- Citizenship: Ukraine
- Occupation: Islamic teacher

Sheikh Said Ismagilov (Ukrainian: Сергій Валерійович Ісмагілов) - Mufti of the Religious Administration of Muslims of Ukraine “Ummah”, one of Muslim spiritual leaders of Ukraine, President of All-Ukrainian Public Organization “Ukrainian Center for Islamic Studies”, the Head of Muslim Community “Nur” of Donetsk city, the member of Public Organization “Al-Amal” of Donetsk city. Ukrainian scientist majoring in Islamic studies, the member of Donetsk regional cell of Ukrainian Association of Religion Researchers (UARR), the member of a board of directors of Center for Religious Studies and International Spiritual Relationships, the member of Council of Churches and Religious Organizations of Donetsk Region, lecturer of theology and religion in Ukrainian Islamic Institute (2001-2002), prominent public figure.

His main purpose is to raise Muslims of Ukraine as integral part of Ukrainian society.

On 24 Feb. 2022, Ismagilov volunteered in the Ukrainian Armed Forces to fight against the Russian invasion of Ukraine.

== Biography ==
Ismagilov was born on 9 August 1978 in Donetsk, to a Kazan Tatar father Valery Ismagilov and a Mishar Tatar mother Raisa Ismagilova. He is married and has one son.

== Education ==
He enrolled in Donetsk Polytechnic College (Department of Engineering Mechanics) in 1993 and graduated in 1997.

He also attended the Department of Theology of Moscow Higher Islamic College (currently Moscow Islamic University) and graduated in 1997, with the title of imam khatib.

He is fluent in 4 languages: Ukrainian, Russian, Tatar, Arabic.

In 2002, Ismagilov enrolled in the State Institute of Artificial Intellect of Donetsk (Department of Philosophy and Religious Studies). In 2007 he received a Bachelor's degree in Philosophy and Master's degree in Religious Studies.

From 2002 to 2009 Ismagilov was the imam of the Donetsk Muslim Community Duslyk. Before that he was the imam of Shahtarsk (Donetsk Oblast).

== Religious career ==
On January 25, 2009 he was elected Mufti of the Religious Administration of Muslims of Ukraine “Ummah”.

In 2017 he said that the Muslim position in Russia is worse than in Ukraine.

With representatives of other religions, he participated in releasing a catholic priest from captivity. He was active in the Interconfessional praying marathon "For peace and unity of Ukraine in Donetsk" which started on March 4, 2014, and in demonstrations for peace in Donetsk city in the beginning of spring 2014.

In statement on the terrorist murders in France on January 7, 2015, Ismagilov said:

Although the journal published cartoons of the Prophet Muhammad (peace be upon him!), which undoubtedly offends the religious sentiments of Muslims, such issues must be resolved in a civilized fashion, within the legal framework of each specific country. God judges them. Islam forbids violence, murders and lawlessness and, therefore, today’s crime has been a shock to the entire European Muslim community. We don’t know whether criminals were Muslims or not, these events are connected with caricatures or foreign policy of France, but this is disagreeable to us that Muslims and Islam are blamed in such situations. Even if it turns out that the criminals consider themselves Muslims, we - Muslims of Europe -condemn such actions.

== Political career ==
Ismagilov ran in the parliamentary election for the Verkhovna Rada on October 26, 2014 as a representative of All-Ukrainian Political Party “Ukraina – Jedyna Kraina” (“Ukraine – One Country”) in the multi-mandate all-state election constituency. He was the fourth in the electoral list of party.

== Academic career ==
During 2001–2002, he was a lecturer of theology and religious studies in Ukrainian Islamic university (Donetsk). He lectured religious studies in State Institute of Artificial Intellect of Donetsk. He took part in numerous Ukrainian and international scientific and practical conferences. In 2003, in cooperation with other scientists, he established All-Ukrainian Public Organization “Ukrainian Center for Islamic Studies” and further he was elected its president.
