= Religious Administration of Muslims of Ukraine =

Islamic organization based in Ukraine

- Духовне управління мусульман України «Умма»
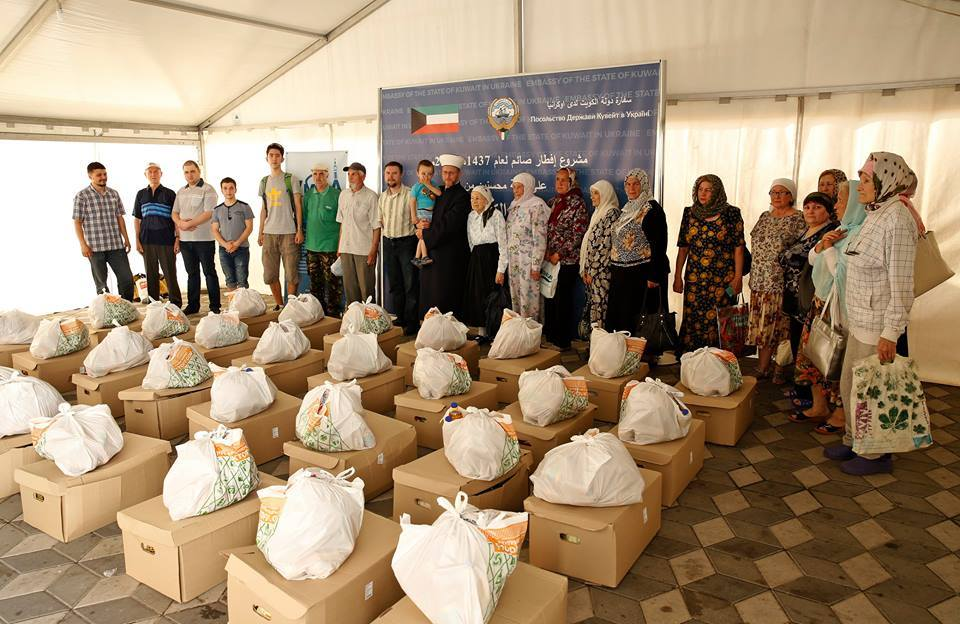
- Abbreviation: RAMU "Ummah"
- Formation: 11 September 2008
- Founded at: Kyiv
- Type: Religious organization
- Headquarters: Ukraine

Religious Administration of Muslims of Ukraine "Ummah" (Ukrainian: Духовне управління мусульман України «Умма») – union of religious communities of Muslims of Ukraine, established for coordination of actions and providing conditions for worship and preaching of Sunni tradition of Islam. It was registered on September 11, 2008 by State Committee for National and Religious Affairs of Ukraine.

== History ==
Initiators of establishing of RAMU "Ummah" were independent Muslims communities from ten regions of Ukraine: Kyiv, Donetsk, Zaporizhzhia, Odesa, Simferopol, Chernivtsi, Vinnytsia, Poltava, Kharkiv and Kadiivka (Luhansk region).

Leading body of RAMU "Ummah" is general meeting. Elections of Mufti and Board (Council of imams) of 7 persons (6 imams and Mufti) hold on general meeting once in 2 years. The main goal of RAMU "UMMAH" is coordination of actions and providing conditions for worship and preaching of Sunni tradition of Islam. The goals of RAMU "UMMAH" include a revival of cultural and historical Islamic values and traditions, providing education in spiritual institutions, publishing activities, etc. RAMU "UMMAH" seeks dialog and cooperation with all communities and religious administration of Muslims which belong to Sunni tradition of Islam.

RAMU "Ummah" coordinates activity of Muslim communities in 17 regions of Ukraine: Kyiv, Vinnytsia Oblast, Dnipropetrovsk Oblast, Donetsk Oblast, Zhytomyr Oblast, Zaporizhzhia Oblast, Kyiv Oblast, Luhansk Oblast, Lviv Oblast, Odesa Oblast, Poltava Oblast, Sumy Oblast, Kharkiv Oblast, Khmelnytskyi Oblast, Cherkasy Oblast, Chernivtsi Oblast and Autonomous Republic of Crimea. Most members are ethnic Ukrainians; however, organization is aimed at working with all Muslim community of Ukraine. Chairman of Board of RAMU "Ummah" – Oleh Huzyk, Mufti – Said Ismagilov.

RAMU "Ummah" has own printed periodical – religious and educational paper "Ummah". Imams of this organization study in Islamic universities of Lebanon, Yemen and Jordan. On December 5, 2016 authorized representative of RAMU "Ummah" signed the Charter of Ukrainian Muslims.

== Activity ==
RAMU "Ummah" engages in educational activity and participates in public and political life of Ukraine. In particular, Religious Administration of Muslims of Ukraine "Ummah" initiated International Summer School for Islamic Studies for young people (organizers: Center for Islamic Studies and AUASO "Alraid"). Up to August 2016 it was held 5 summer schools, which Ukrainian and foreign scientist participated in. Subjects of research in schools for Islamic studies include aspects of history and modern Islam in Ukraine, Western Europe, North America, Middle East, Northern and Central Africa, Central Asia and Japan.

In March 2016 in Odesa RAMU "Ummah" initiated conducting of international round table dedicated to 350 anniversary of visiting of Southern Ukraine and Crimea by historian and traveler Evliya Çelebi. During working of round table the monograph "Islam in Ukraine: history and modernity" of Mykhaylo Yakubovych, Ukrainian scientist and translator, was presented for the first time.

Among sphere of activity of Religious Administration of Muslims of Ukraine "Ummah" charitable support for unwilling migrants from Crimea and Donbas, indigent Muslims are presented. Islamic Cultural Centers (ICC) belonged to RAMU "UMMAH" form lists of indigent Muslims, which receive desired material assistance. Such practice belongs to traditional activities of all ICC of Ukraine.

== International cooperation ==
RAMU "UMMAH" participates in the international interreligious dialog aimed at achieving of mutual understanding between European Christians and Muslims. In December 2015 RAMU "UMMAH" organized a round table "Future of Muslim-Christian relationships in Europe in context of modern migration processes", which religious scholars, philosophers, Christian and Muslims religious leaders from Ukraine, Germany and Poland participated in. Said Ismagilov, Mufti of the Religious Administration of Muslims of Ukraine "Ummah", took part in the round table.
