= Iru =

Iru or IRU may refer to:

== IRU ==
- Incident Response Unit – a team responding to (for example) a major fire's knock-on effect on surrounding infrastructure (roads, railways, homes)
- International Road Transport Union (IRU)
- International Romani Union, an organization of the Romani people
- Inertial Reference Unit, a sensor for aircraft and spacecraft
- Indefeasible rights of use, a long-term lease of bandwidth (telecommunications)
- Innovative Research Universities, network of seven Australian universities
- Irish Rugby Union short for Irish Rugby Football Union

== Iru ==
- Iru Khechanovi (born 2000), Georgian singer and songwriter
- Iru (food), type of fermented locust beans used as a condiment in cooking
- Iru (brachiopod), genus of brachiopod
- Iru, alternative rominziation of Il, a character from the manga series Shugo Chara! by Peach-Pit
- Iru (village), village in Jõelähtme Parish, Harju County, Estonia
- Iru, Tallinn, subdistrict of Tallinn, Estonia
- Iru hillfort, Viking Age hillfort in Tallinn, Estonia
- Iru!, a 1998 video game for the PlayStation
