= Islam in Estonia =

Islam in Europe by percentage of country population 95–100%: Azerbaijan; 90–95%: Turkey; Kosovo; 50–70%: Albania; Bosnia and Herzegovina; Kazakhstan; 30–35%: North Macedonia; 10–20%: France; Georgia; Montenegro; 5–10%: Austria; Belgium; Bulgaria; Denmark; Germany; Liechtenstein; Luxembourg; Netherlands; Russia; Sweden; Switzerland; United Kingdom; Spain; Greece; 4–5%: Serbia; 2–4%: Italy; Finland; Norway; Malta; Slovenia; Cyprus (Note: Only takes into account the Muslim population residing on land controlled by the Republic of Cyprus.); 1–2%: Croatia; Ireland; Ukraine; Andorra; < 1%: Iceland; Armenia; Belarus; Czech Republic; Estonia; Hungary; Latvia; Lithuania; Moldova; Monaco; Poland; Portugal; Romania; San Marino; Slovakia

Estonia has a small, but growing Islamic community. According to 2024 estimates, the number of people in Estonia who profess Islam was 10,000 or 0.73% of the total population. The number of practicing Muslims is small and, in the absence of a mosque, the Estonian Islamic Centre serves as a center of worship.

== Demography ==
According to a 2008 estimate, there were approximately 4,000 Muslims living in Estonia. The largest Muslim groups in Estonia consist of Tatars (of Mishar origin) and Azeris. There are also smaller amounts of Muslims belonging to various regional and ethnic backgrounds (including converts to Islam). The majority of Muslims in Estonia are Sunni except for the Azeris, who are Shia. Most Estonian Muslims live in or around Tallinn. As of 2024, there were a reported 10,000 Muslims in Estonia, the majority of whom were foreign students and their family members.

== History ==
Coins from the Islamic world minted as early as the 8th century have been discovered in Estonia, which were brought to the area by Viking merchants.

The earliest documented presence of Muslims in Estonia occurred when Muslim soldiers from the Russian Empire arrived in Estonia during the Livonian War in the 16th century. The first Muslims to settle in Estonia were mostly Sunni Tatars who had been released from the military service in the Russian Army after Estonia and Livonia had been conquered by the Russian Empire in 1721. The small Tatar community became concentrated within Tallinn and by the mid-19th century, had established a mosque with a serving imam.

After 1860, a new wave of Tatar immigrants arrived in Estonia as merchants. The Tatar community started showing activity, the centre being in the city of Narva although some also settled in Tallinn and Tartu. The Tatar community opened shops and engaged in trade. A Muslim congregation (Narva Muhamedi Kogudus) was registered there under the independent Republic of Estonia in 1928 and a second one (Tallinna Muhamedi Usuühing) in Tallinn in 1939. A house built for funds received as donations was converted into a mosque in Narva.

According to the 1934 census, there were 170 Muslims in Estonia, of whom 166 were Tartars.

In 1940, the Soviet authorities banned both congregations, and the buildings of the congregations were destroyed during World War II (in 1944). The overwhelming majority of Muslims immigrated to Estonia during the Soviet occupation of Estonia between 1940 and 1991.

The Muslim community in Estonia is considered tolerant and politically moderate. Unusually in the global context, the Sunnis and Shias worship jointly.

== Mosque ==
- Estonian Islamic Center

== Gallery ==
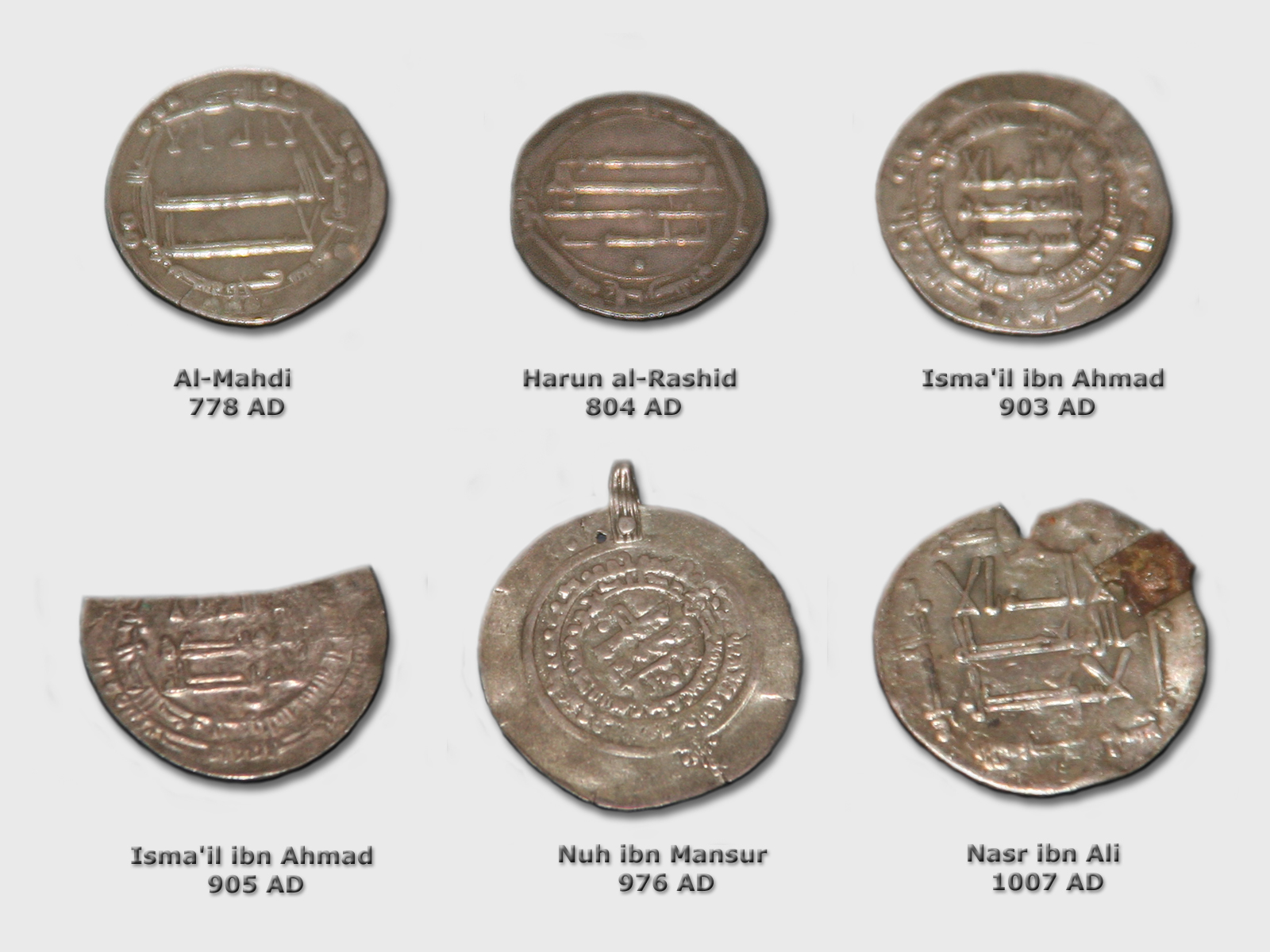
Islamic Golden Age coins found in Estonia.

== See also ==
- Religion in Estonia
