= Nordic identity in Estonia =

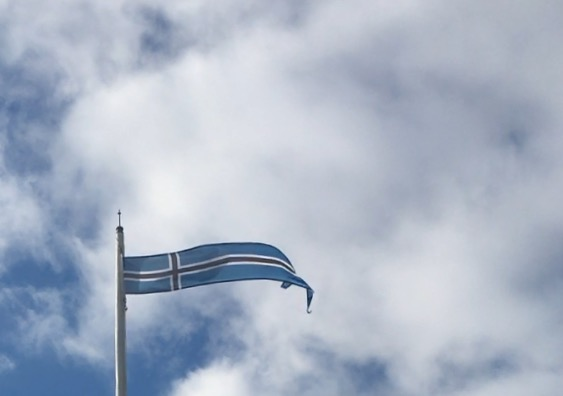
An Estonian cross flag on the island of Vormsi

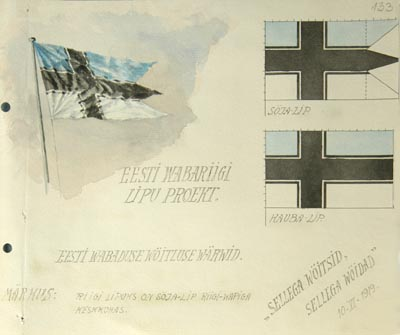
Estonian cross flag proposal from 1919

Nordic identity in Estonia refers to the concept that Estonia is, or ought to be considered, one of the Nordic countries. The current mainstream view outside of Estonia does not usually include Estonia among Nordic countries, but categorizing it as a Nordic or Northern European country is common in Estonia.

A push towards being defined as a "Nordic" has existed in independent Estonia since the war of independence in 1918, however, gaining "official membership" of the Nordic region was interrupted by their annexation by the Soviet Union during World War II. Estonia has been interested in joining the Nordic region again since 1991, when it regained its independence from the Soviet Union's occupation.

The Estonian language is closely related to the Finnish language; both are Finnic languages. The Swedish indigenous minority called eestirootslased or rannarootslased in Estonian, and estlandssvenskar or aibofolket in Swedish, has attestably lived in Estonia since the 13th century, similarly to Finnish Swedes in Finland. The extensive settlement of Swedes in northern and western Estonia, especially in the islands and coastal areas, has had a significant impact on Estonian culture and language. In the late Middle Ages, Swedes made up about 25% of the population of Tallinn (Reval), the capital, and even more in Haapsalu (Hapsal). The number of Swedes in Estonia fell sharply due to the Soviet occupation. The Scandinavian connection from the Estonian Viking Age and later from being a part of the kingdoms of Denmark and Sweden for several centuries, especially northern Estonia (historically called Estland), left a lasting influence on the creation of the Estonian identity during the national awakening period of the 19th century.

The Nordic countries are among the most important trade partners of Estonia. Estonia's largest import and export partners from the Nordic countries are Finland and Sweden (23% of all exports and 20% of all imports in July 2020). Three quarters of the investments that go to Estonia come from the Nordic countries, especially from Finland.

== Public attitudes ==
Põhjamaad means both "Nordic countries" and "Northern countries" in the modern Estonian language. Whereas very few Estonians self-identify as Scandinavians, the ethnic Estonians' homeland has been almost invariably referred to as põhjamaa ("Northern country", instead of "Western" or "Eastern" country), both in Estonian popular culture and media, as well as in surveys of public opinion and statements made by leading politicians.

53.3% of ethnically Estonian youth consider belonging in the Nordic identity group as important or very important for them. 52.2% have the same attitude towards the "Baltic" identity group, according to a research study from 2013.

The image that Estonian youths have of their identity is rather similar to that of the Finns as far as the identities of being a citizen of one’s own country, a Finno-Ugric person, or a Nordic person are concerned, while our identity as a citizen of Europe is common ground between us and Latvians – being stronger here than it is among the young people of Finland and Sweden. [...] the importance of being a Nordic country has risen to an equal level with the Baltic identity among young people

Sociologist Mikko Lagerspetz has observed that the attitudes towards the Nordic identity in Estonian society can be grouped in three: (1) Estonia is already a Nordic country; (2) Estonia needs to become a Nordic country but is not there yet; (3) Estonia should walk its own unique path.

== Modern political narrative ==
An important element in Estonia's post-independence reorientation has been closer ties with the Nordic countries, especially Finland and Sweden. In December 1999, then Estonian foreign minister (and President of Estonia from 2006 until 2016) Toomas Hendrik Ilves delivered a speech titled "Estonia as a Nordic Country" to the Swedish Institute for International Affairs. In 2003, the foreign ministry also hosted an exhibit called "Estonia: Nordic with a Twist".

In 2015, the Estonian prime minister Taavi Rõivas defined the country's narrative as a "New Nordic Country", or "Uus Põhjamaa".

A conference comprising the heads of the coalition government was held in September 2016, discussing Estonia's outlook as a Nordic country.

Becoming a new Nordic country does not necessarily mean that we will emulate the Nordic countries – copying will never make us anything else than a poor copy of Sweden. We have got to get to where we need to with more courage to take risks, we need to show more initiative, to experiment more and to also make more mistakes, not just limit ourselves to learning from others and continuing to compare ourselves against others.

— Taavi Rõivas, Prime Minister of Estonia

Kersti Kaljulaid, president of Estonia from 2016 to 2021, commented on views of then Estonian foreign minister Ilves, saying that she does not want to use "loaded words" like Nordic or Baltic but prefers to call like-minded countries of northern Europe the "Nordic Benelux".

The Nordic narrative is also communicated by government agencies:

- Invest in Estonia – The national investment agency
- Brand Estonia
- RMK – The national forestry organization
- Enterprise Estonia
- The Foreign Ministry

When the state-owned Estonian flag carrier was renamed as Nordica in 2016, Erik Sakkov, then board member of the company, explained the airline's naming (according to some Estonian media outlets) with Estonia's continual self-identification among Nordic countries (Põhjamaad in Estonian) and with country's leaders wish to emphasize it in the name of the national carrier. However, similar explanation by Sakkov which was published on Nordica homepage in English, claimed that motivation behind naming was Estonia's alignment with "Northern Europe" and country's leaders wish to reflect that.

The Swedish ambassador to Estonia, Anders Ljunggren, said in 2015 that "Estonia would have been considered a Nordic country by the other Nordic countries, had the history been different...The differences between Estonia and Sweden have become less year by year, owing to the fact that the two countries have gotten to know each other more each year".

== Criticism ==
The Tuglas Society has claimed that the Nordic definition that Estonia is moving towards does not exist anymore, being a relic of past times.

Per Högselius, a Swedish historian and professor, wrote an opinion piece about the topic in 2003, looking at the idea as fringe, but concluding that "in time the Estonians might be able to persuade us".

== Historic contacts with the Nordic Council ==
The Nordic Council had historically been a strong supporter of Estonian independence from the Soviet Union. The Nordic Council of Ministers' Office in Estonia was opened in spring 1991.

== Proposed flags ==
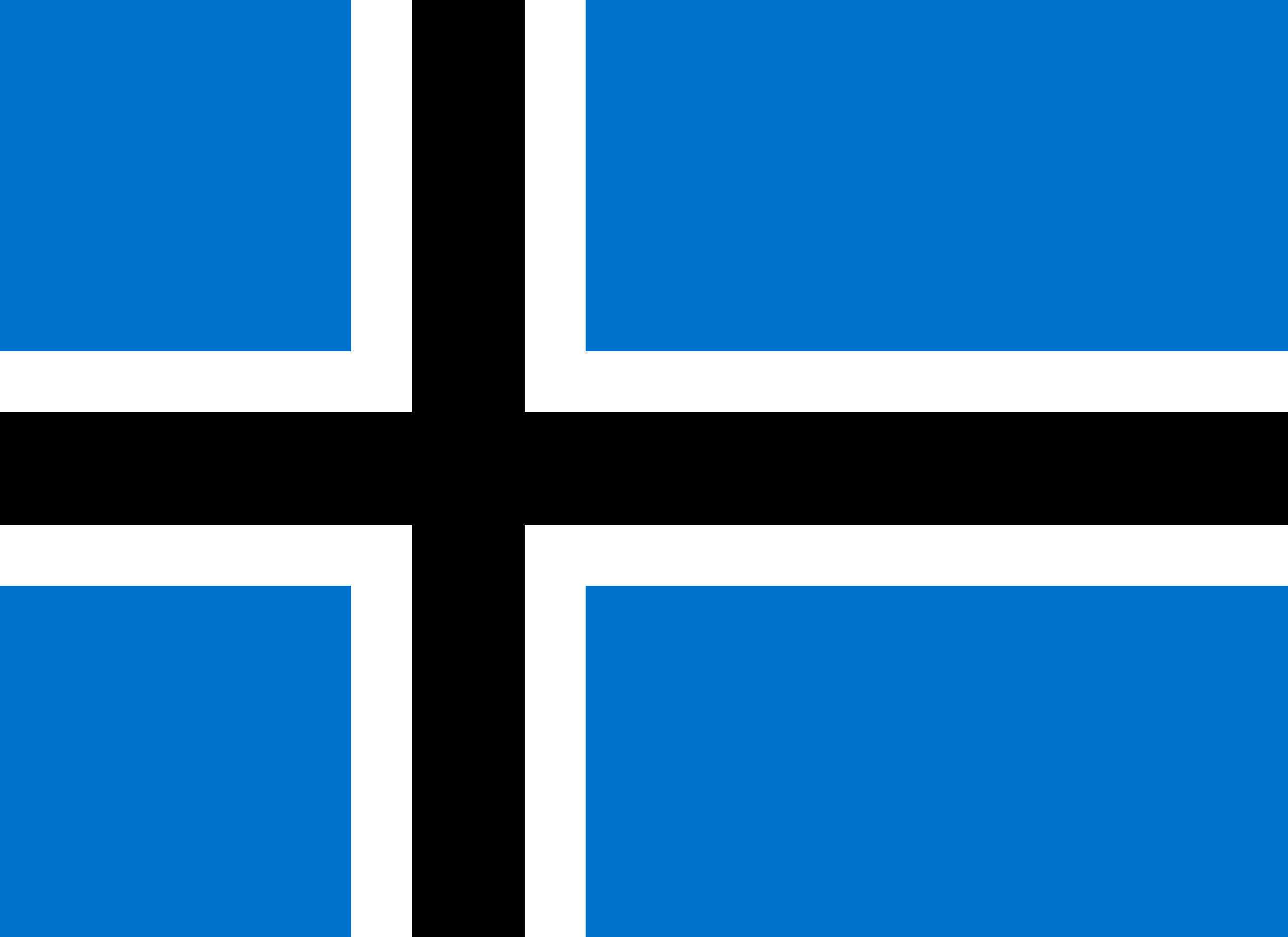
A proposed Nordic cross flag design

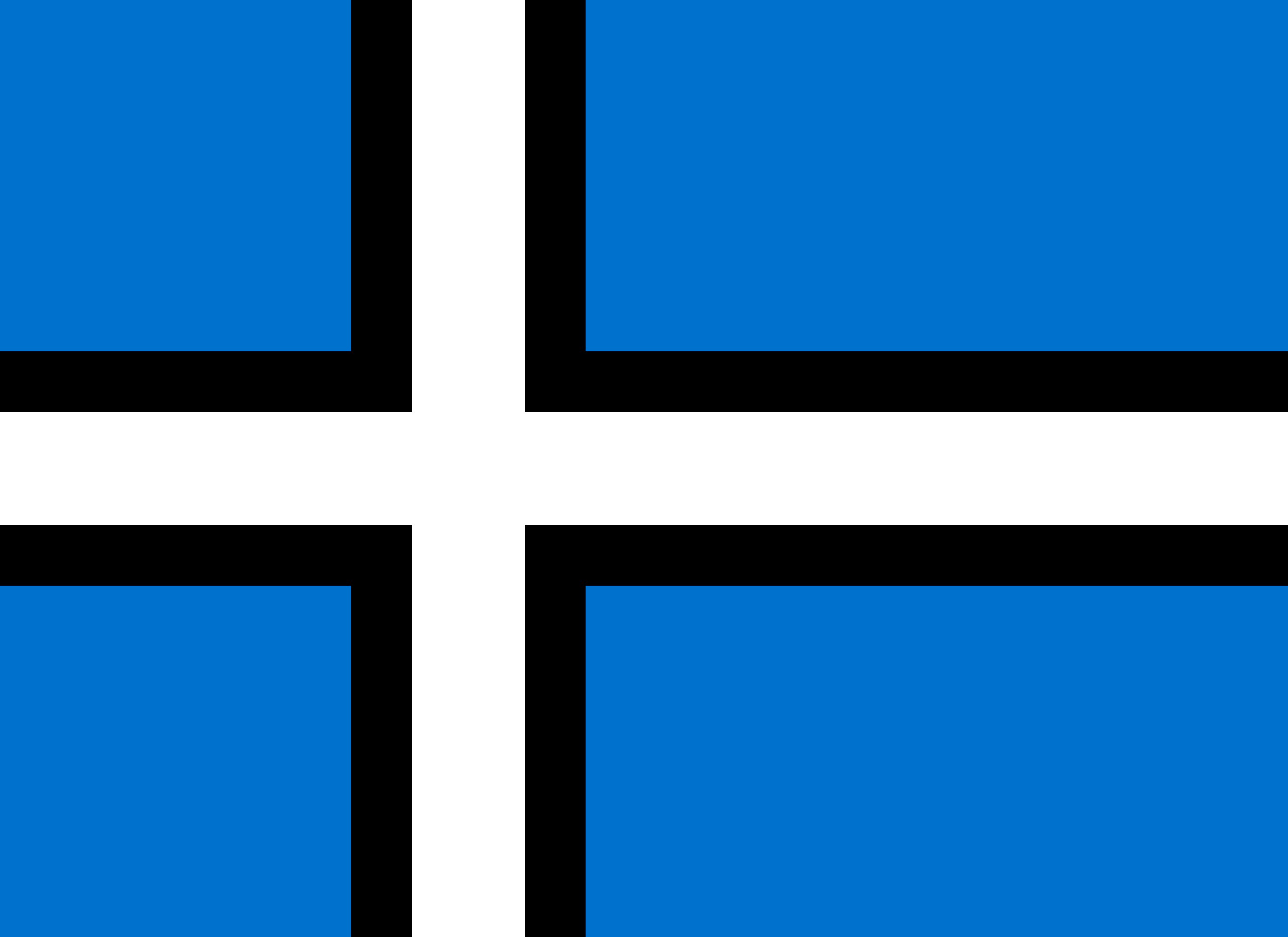
A proposed Nordic cross flag design

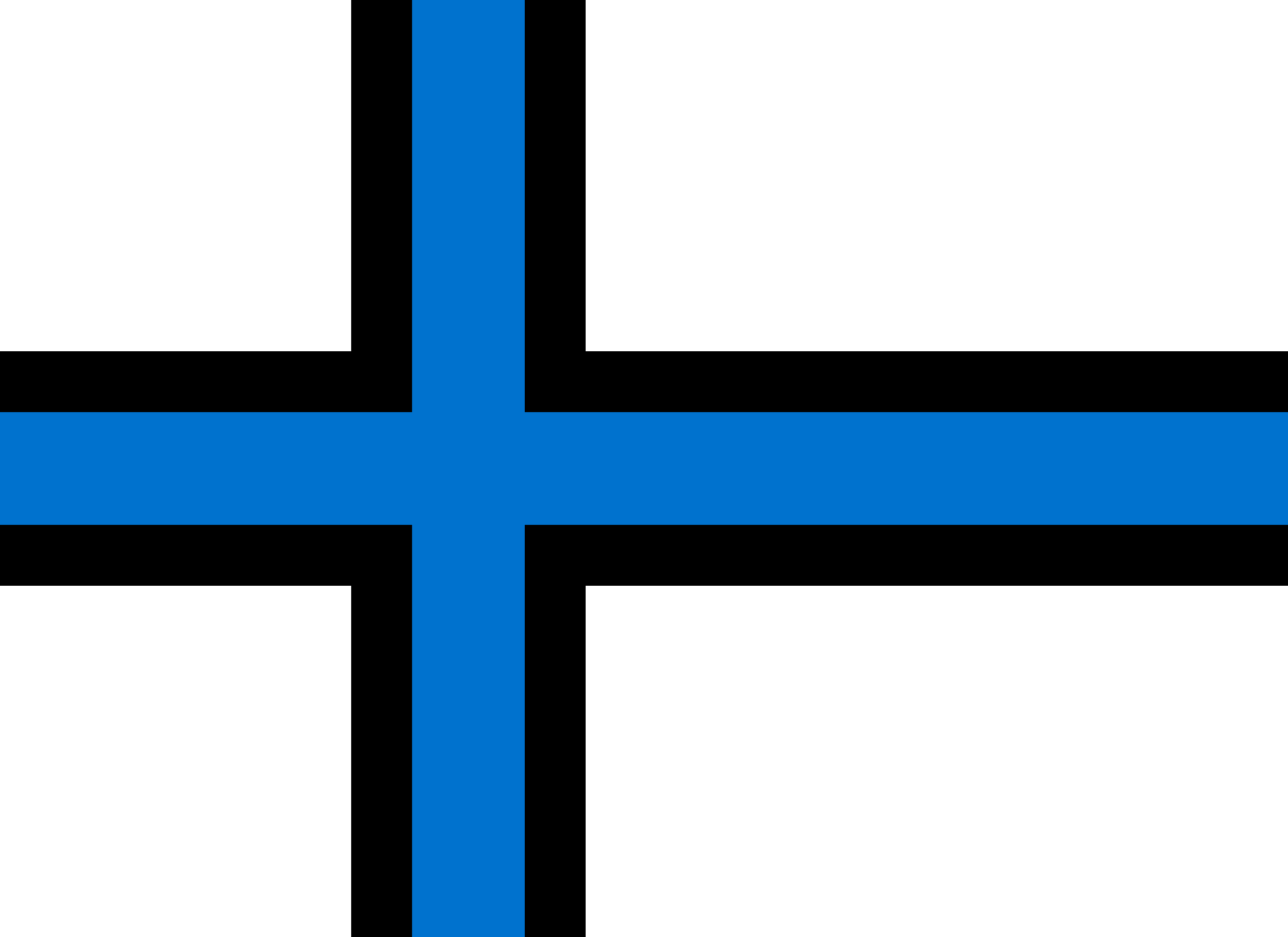
A proposed Nordic cross flag design

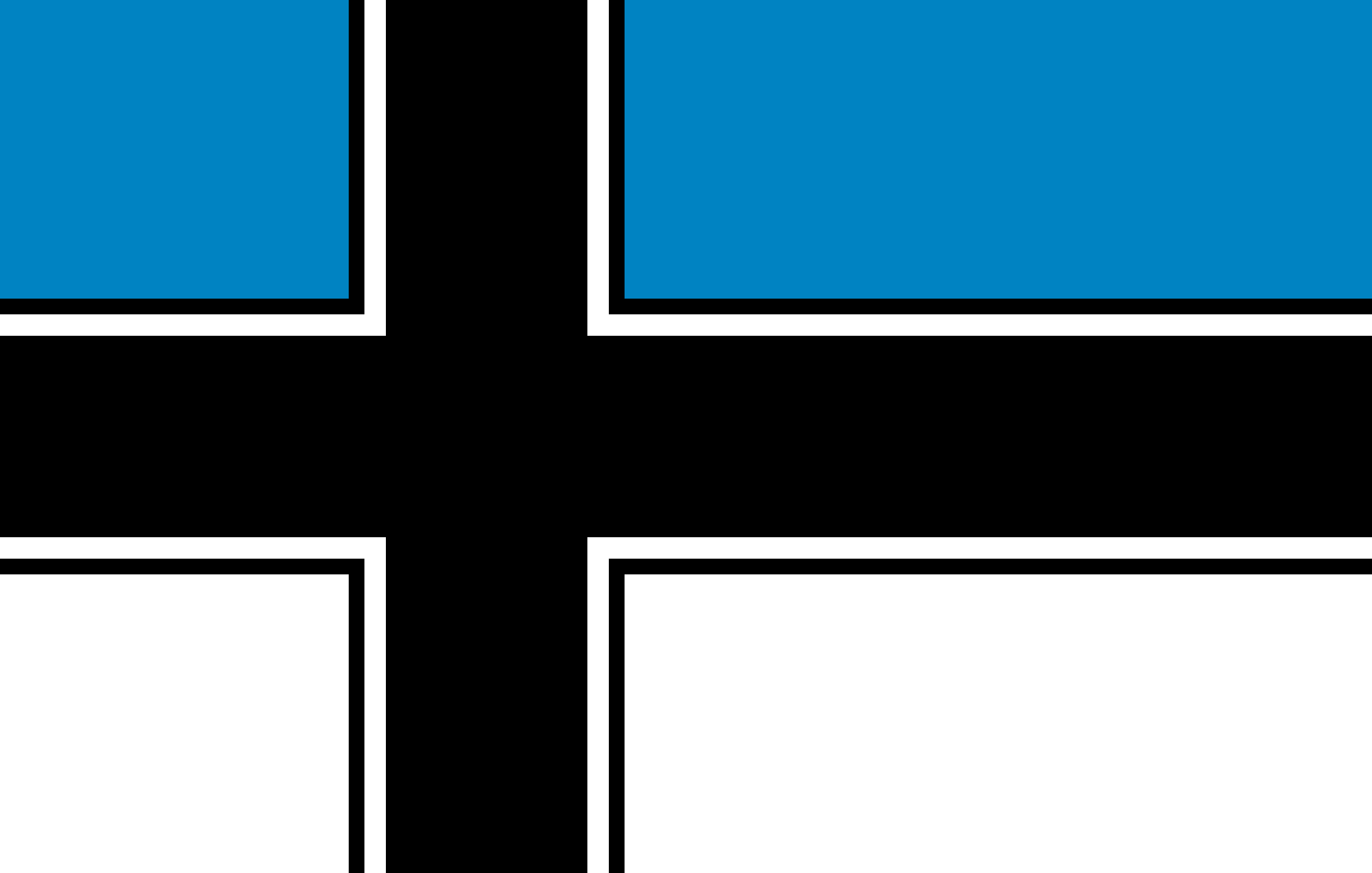
Estonian cross flag proposal made in 1919

== See also ==
- Baltoscandia
- Danish Estonia
- Estonian kroon
- Fennoscandia
- Intermarium
- Nordic-Baltic Eight
- Nordic countries
- Swedish Estonia
- Viking Age in Estonia
