= Viking Age in Estonia =

Period in the history of Estonia

Viking Age Estonia
- 793 AD – 1066 AD
Pre-Viking Age Estonia	Danish Estonia, Terra Mariana
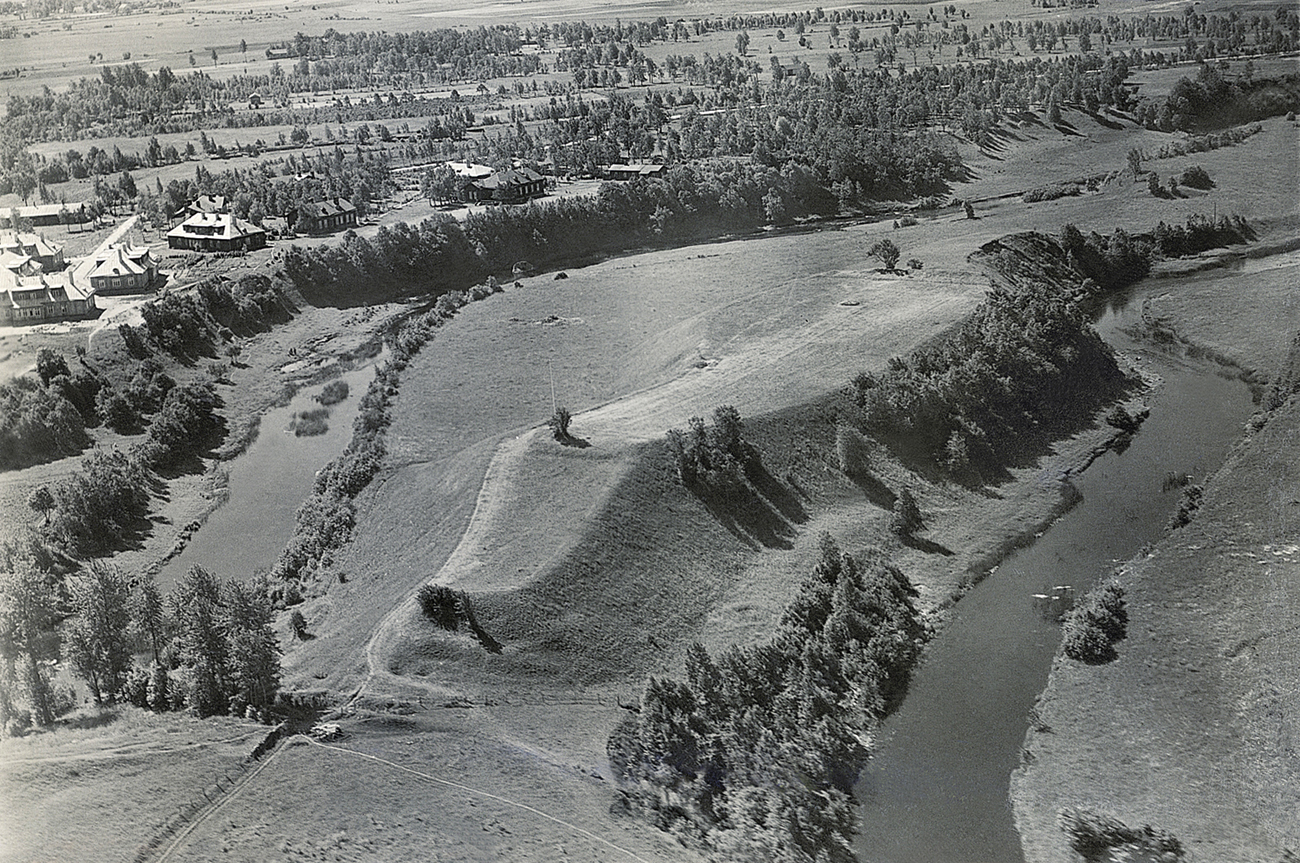
- The Iru hillfort in Northern Estonia

The Viking Age in Estonia was a period in the history of Estonia, part of the Viking Age (793–1066 AD). It was not a unified country at the time, and the area of Ancient Estonia was divided among loosely allied regions. It was preceded by the Bronze and Early Iron Ages in Estonia, during which an agrarian society had developed, the Migration Period (450–550 AD), and Pre-Viking Age (550–800 AD) with the Viking Age itself lasting between 800 and 1050 AD. It is often considered to be part of the Iron Age period which started around 400 AD and ended around 1200 AD. Some 16th-century Swedish chronicles attribute the Pillage of Sigtuna in 1187 to Estonian raiders.

The society, economy, settlement and culture of the territory of what is in the present-day the country of Estonia is studied mainly through archaeological sources. The era is seen to have been a period of rapid change. The Estonian peasant culture came into existence by the end of the Viking Age. The overall understanding of the Viking Age in Estonia is deemed to be fragmentary and superficial, because of the limited amount of surviving source material. The main sources for understanding the period are remains of the farms and fortresses of the era, cemeteries and a large amount of excavated objects.

The landscape of Ancient Estonia featured numerous hillforts, some later hillforts on Saaremaa heavily fortified during the Viking Age and on to the 12th century. The areas of Northern and Western Estonia belonged in the Scandinavian cultural sphere during the Viking Age. There were a number of late prehistoric or medieval harbour sites on the coast of Saaremaa, but none have been found that are large enough to be international trade centres. The Estonian islands also have a number of graves from the Viking Age, both individual and collective, with weapons and jewellery. Weapons found in Estonian Viking Age graves are common to types found throughout Northern Europe and Scandinavia.

== Written sources ==
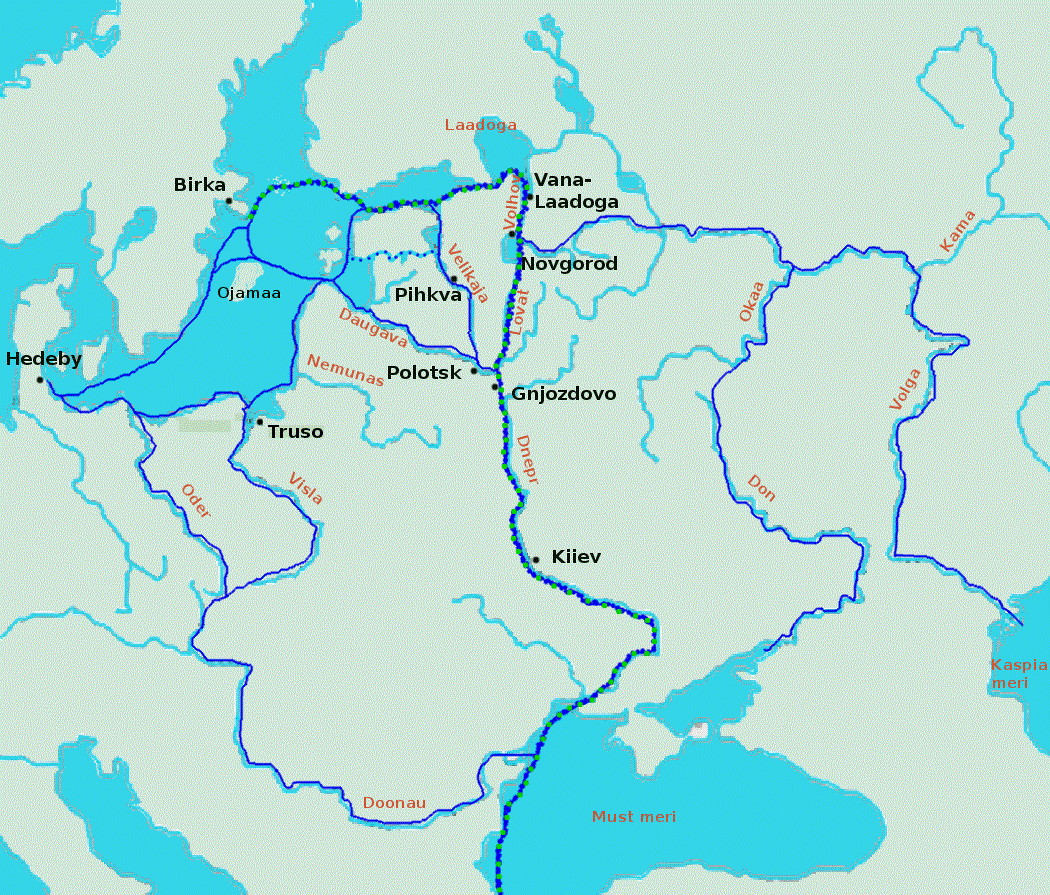
Route from the Varangians to the Greeks

Saxo Grammaticus describes the inhabitants of Estonia and the Curonians as participating in the Battle of Bråvalla on the side of the Swedes against the Danes, who were aided by the Livonians and the Wends of Pomerania. Baltic tribes — i.e., the Letts and Lithuanians — are not mentioned by Saxo as participating in the fight.

Snorri Sturluson relates in his Ynglinga saga how the Swedish king Ingvar Harra (7th century), the son of Östen and a great warrior, who was forced to patrol the shores of his kingdom fighting vikings from Estonia. The saga speaks of his invasion of Estonia where he fell in a battle against the men of Estland who had come down with a great army. After the battle, King Ingvar was buried close to the seashore in Estonia and the Swedes returned home.

According to Heimskringla sagas, in the year 967 the Norwegian Queen Astrid escaped with her son, later king of Norway Olaf Tryggvason, from her homeland to Novgorod where her brother Sigurd held an honoured position at the court of Prince Vladimir. On their journey, "vikings from Estonia" raided the ship, killing some of the crew and taking others into slavery. Six years later, when Sigurd Eirikson traveled to Estonia to collect taxes on behalf of Valdemar, he spotted Olaf in a market on Saaremaa and paid for his freedom.

A battle between Estonian and Icelandic Vikings off Saaremaa is described in Njál's saga as occurring in 972 AD.

About 1008, Olaf II Haraldsson, later king of Norway, landed on Saaremaa. The local inhabitants, taken by surprise, had at first tried to negotiate the demands made by the king and his men, but then gathered an army and confronted them. Nevertheless, Olaf (who was 12 or 13 years old at the time) won the battle.

Around the year 1030, a Swedish Viking chief called Freygeirr may have been killed in a battle on Saaremaa.

The Livonian Chronicle describes the inhabitants of Estonia as using two kinds of ships, the piratica and the liburna. The former was a warship, the latter mainly a merchant ship. A piratica could carry approximately 30 men and had a high prow shaped like a dragon or a snakehead as well as a quadrangular sail.

== Economy ==
In the Viking Age, the most definitive export from the area of Estonia was iron. In Estonia the raw material of iron in the form of bog iron is found in several places. It has been estimated that the export of iron from Estonia started before the Final Iron Age.

As with other locations in Northern Europe during the Viking Age, swords and spears were manufactured in Estonia. Petersen’s K type blades were the most numerous in Estonia during the 10th century, and Petersen’s M-type spearheads have also been found.

== Archaeology ==
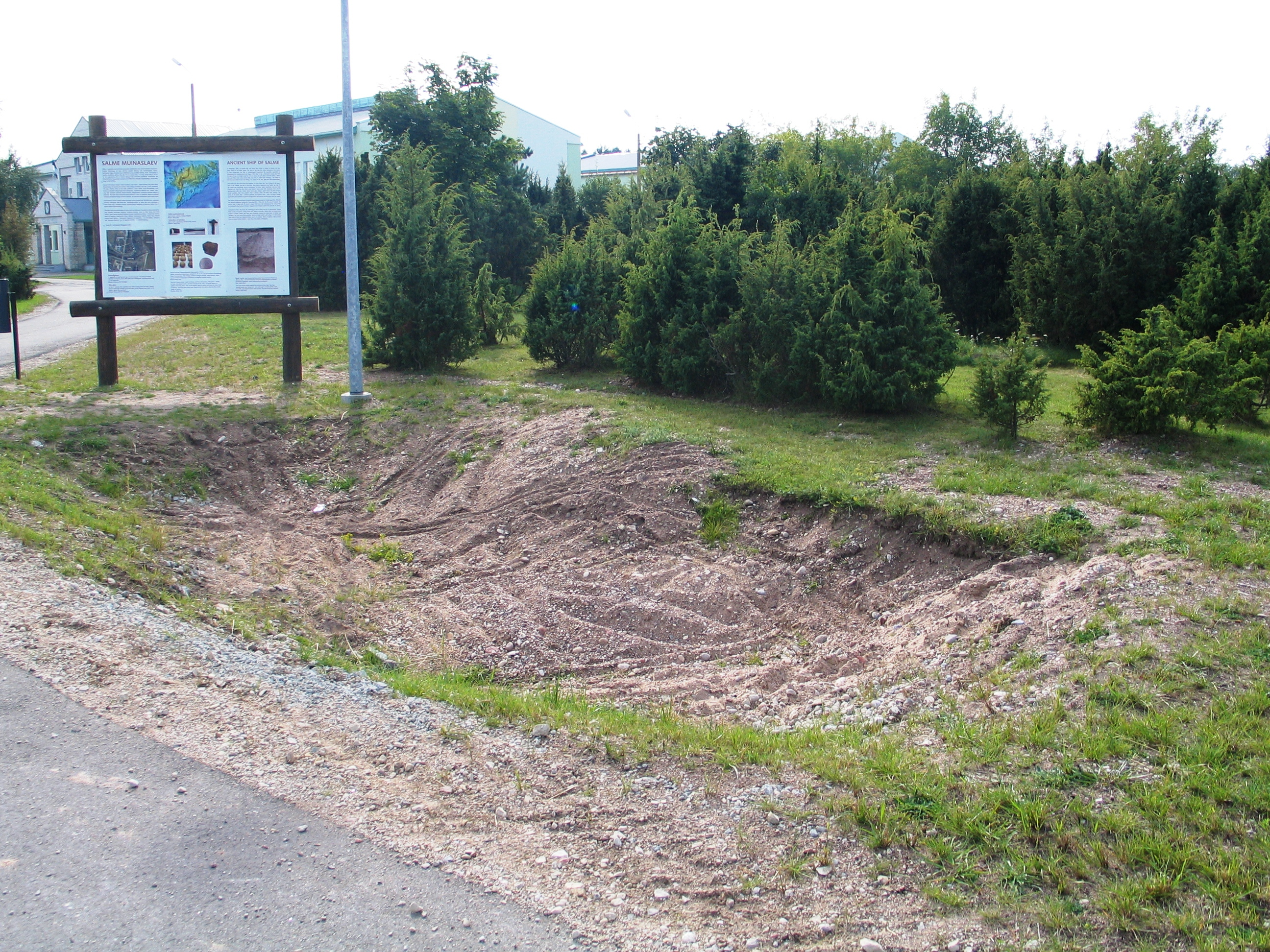
The site of one of the excavated Salme ships.

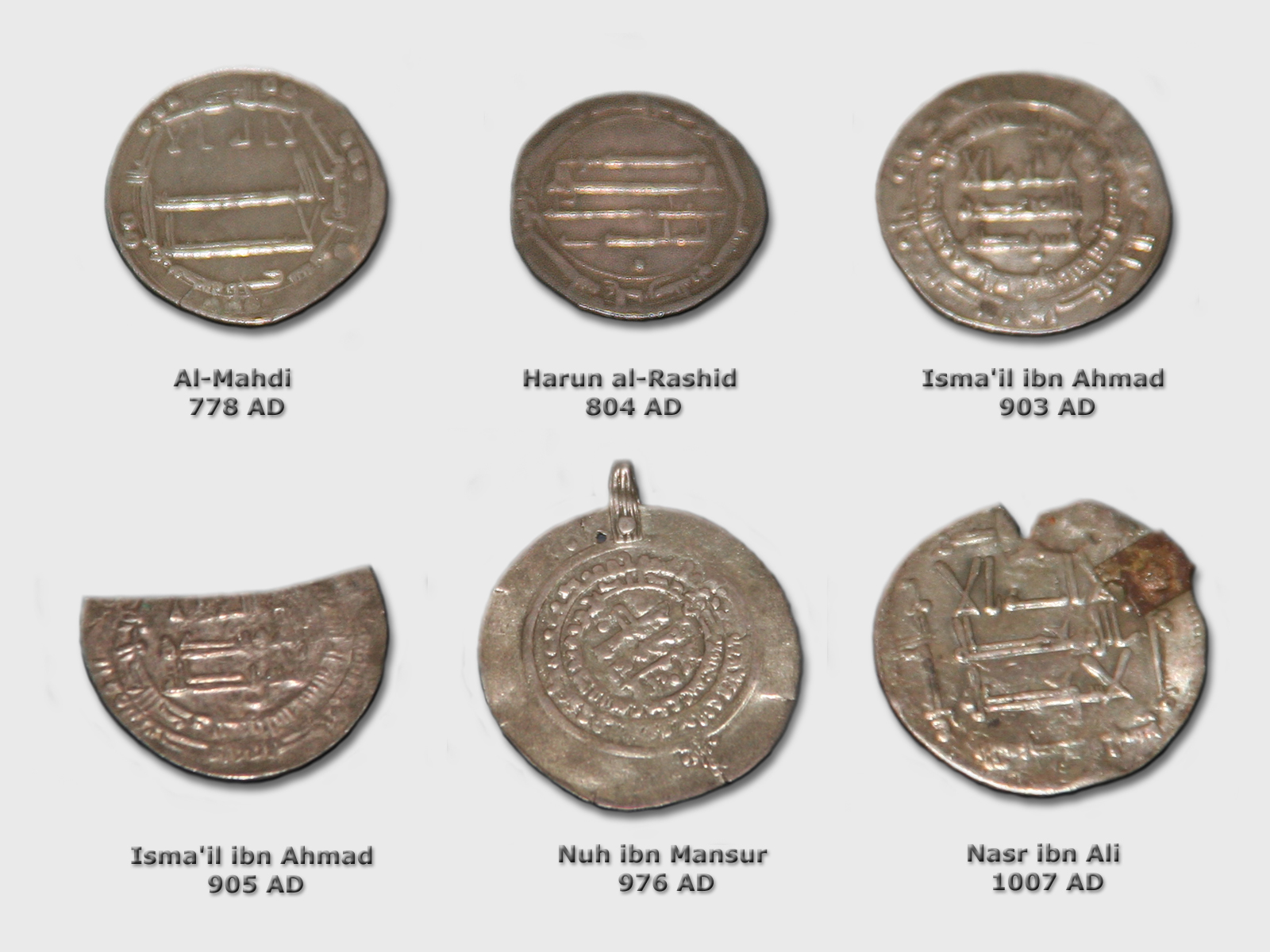
From Dirham hoards in Estonia

Viking-Age treasures from Estonia mostly contain silver coins and bars. Compared to its close neighbors, Saaremaa has the richest finds of Viking treasures after Gotland in Sweden. This strongly suggests that Estonia was an important transit country during the Viking era.

Estonia constitutes one of the richest territories in Northern-Europe for hoards from the 11th and the 12th centuries. The earliest coin hoards found in Estonia are Arabic Dirhams from the 8th century. The largest Viking-Age hoards found in Estonia have been at Maidla and Kose. Out of the 1500 coins published in catalogues, 1000 are Anglo-Saxon.

In 2008 and 2010, two clinker-built ships of Scandinavian origin were discovered near the village of Salme on Saaremaa. Called the Salme ships, both vessels were used for ship burials around AD 700–750 in the Nordic Iron Age and contained the remains of more than 40 warriors killed in battle, as well as numerous weapons and other artifacts.

During the Viking Age in Estonia, the area of Estonia was divided between two distinct cultural areas – Northern and Western Estonia, and Southeastern Estonia. Northern and Western Estonia which constituted 2/3 of Estonia and was densely populated, including Ösel, were deemed to be in the Scandinavian cultural area.

The ship burials at Salme that were excavated in 2011 and 2013, and have been dated to circa 750 AD, have been interpreted as being of men who had travelled to Saaremaa from Sweden, based on all weapons and other artefacts being of typically Swedish types, but excavations of a cult site at Viidumäe on Saaremaa (20 km from Salme), beginning in 2014, a site dated to the 7th and 8th centuries, that is before and slightly after the Salme ship burials, have shed new light on that, since a large number of weapons and other items of the same types as those found at Salme have been found at the cult site, in a clearly local context with a large number of dress pins of local type but with typical Scandinavian decorations, showing the same types of weapons were in local use. It has long been known that in the 10th century the weapons and other attributes used by warriors on Saaremaa were indistinguishable from those used in Sweden, but the finds at Viidumäe, along with the appearance around 650 AD of a new type of graves on Saaremaa, a type otherwise found only in Sweden, are said to indicate a considerable Swedish impact on Saaremaa’s culture already before the 10th century.

== Population ==
The population of Ancient Estonia in the late Iron Age, circa 1100 AD, is estimated to have been 150,000, with upper estimates around 180,000. This is a five-fold increase from the approximately 30,000 inhabitants of the same area during the Roman Iron Age, circa 400 AD. For comparison, the population of Norway between 1000AD and 1100AD is estimated to have been around 200,000 people.

Finnic tribes have been thought to have lived in both Northern, Western and Southeastern Estonia at around AD 1000. There are also mentions of a possible Norse settlement in Harjumaa on the 11th century.

The inhabitants of Viking Age Estonia are seen as the direct ancestors of modern-day Estonians. Archaeologist Andres Tvauri has commented on the question of ethnicities:

I am convinced that the contemporary Estonian national identity is a product of the events and ideologies of the 18th–19th centuries. At the same time, there is no doubt that the people who inhabited Estonia in the second half of the first millennium are the direct ancestors of modern-day Estonians.

— Andres Tvauri, (Tvauri 2012)

== Culture ==
During the Viking Age, the area of Estonia was divided between two distinct cultural areas – Northern and Western Estonia, and Southeastern Estonia. The areas of Northern and Western Estonia are seen to have belonged to the Scandinavian cultural area at that time. Northern and Western Estonia matched, in general, the areas of the historical provinces Saaremaa, Läänemaa, Harjumaa and Virumaa. The Scandinavian written sources suggest that the four areas were clearly distinguished in the eyes of the Scandinavians, who used separate names for each: Eysysla for Saaremaa, Adalsysla for Läänemaa, Refaland for Harjumaa and Virland for Virumaa. The historic term of Saaremaa included all islands in Western Estonia, not just the single island of Saaremaa which the term is used for today.

== Architecture ==
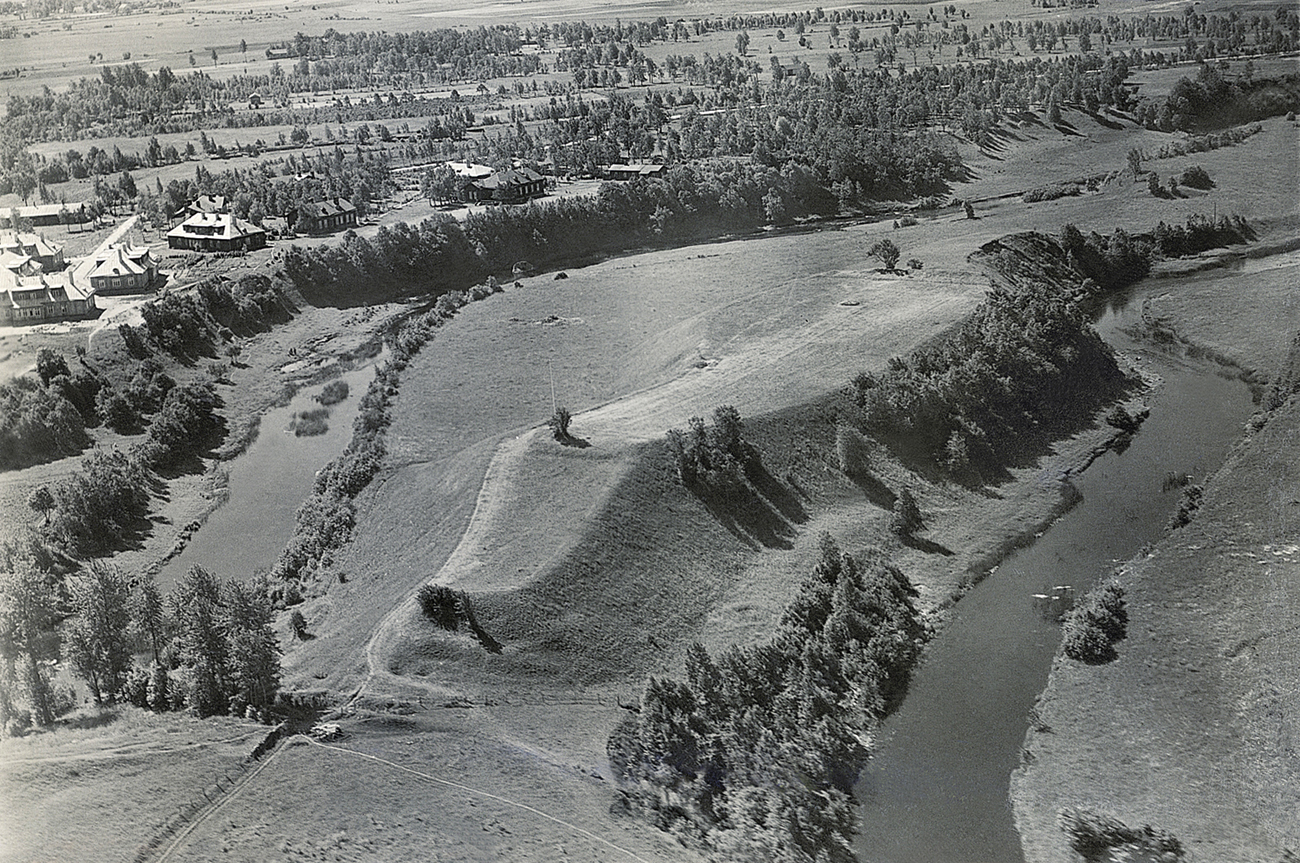
An aerial photo of the Iru fort in Northern Estonia, 1924.

There are 41 known forts in Estonia from the second half of the first millennium. 37 of those were built and/or were in use during the Pre-Viking and the Viking Ages. In north-western Estonia, the fort which has been most thoroughly investigated which was used during the Viking Age is the fort at Iru. The beginning of the Viking Age in Estonia can be considered the most active period of the fort. The fortifications were initially built out of wood and sand, but had later been upgraded with large stone ramparts in both ends.

The forts in Viking Age Estonia were mostly situated in settlement centres. There is also a clearly visible connection between the placement of forts and rivers. This can be explained by the fact that rivers were used as transport mechanisms and also that the slopes of the river banks made for a good placement for forts in the otherwise quite flat Estonian landscape.

=== Areas with forts in Viking Age Estonia ===
Ahisilla	Hinniala	Iru	Kärla	Rõuge	Tilleoru
Kassinurme	Keava	Kurista	Lihula	Saadjärve	Tõrva
Mõrgi	Joaorg	Otepää	Pada	Soontagana	Unipiha
Padise	Peatskivi	Purtse	Rakvere	Tartu	Kuusalu

=== List of Viking Age sites ===
Viking Age sites in Estonia (c. 800–1050)
Numbers refer to the table; red = hillfort, orange = settlement, blue = harbour site, purple = cemetery, teal = Salme ship burials (c. 700–750), green = Viidumäe cult site.
List of numbered map items:
1 Padise (hillfort)
2 Iru (hillfort)
3 Kuusalu Pajulinn (hillfort)
4 Lohu II (hillfort)
5 Keava (hillfort)
6 Ahisilla (hillfort)
7 Varangu (hillfort)
8 Toolse Ussimägi (hillfort)
9 Kloodi Pahnimägi (hillfort)
10 Rakvere (Tarvanpää) (hillfort)
11 Nurkse (hillfort)
12 Pada II (hillfort)
13 Purtse Tarakallas (hillfort)
14 Narva Joaorg (hillfort)
15 Kurista (hillfort)
16 Kassinurme (hillfort)
17 Peatskivi (Alatskivi) (hillfort)
18 Saadjärve (hillfort)
19 Lähte Palalinn (hillfort)
20 Tartu (Toomemägi) (hillfort)
21 Alt-Laari (hillfort)
22 Unipiha (hillfort)
23 Peedu (hillfort)
24 Aakre (hillfort)
25 Otepää (hillfort)
26 Tilleoru Kantsimägi (hillfort)
27 Mõrgi (hillfort)
28 Karula (Rebäse) (hillfort)
29 Rõuge (hillfort)
30 Viljandi (hillfort)
31 Vooru (hillfort)
32 Tõrva Tantsumägi (hillfort)
33 Lihula (hillfort)
34 Soontagana (hillfort)
35 Kärla Lihulinn (hillfort)
36 Asva (hillfort)
37 Truuta Nahaliin (hillfort)
38 Nooska Talimägi (hillfort)
39 Jägala-Joa IV (settlement)
40 Kaberla (settlement)
41 Lehmja (settlement)
42 Aindu (settlement)
43 Olustvere (settlement)
44 Koorküla Valgjärv lake settlement (lake settlement)
45 Tornimäe (harbour site)
46 Viltina (harbour and Rutiränk grave-field) (harbour site)
47 Ehmja Varetemägi (cemetery)
48 Keskvere III (cemetery)
49 Uugla I (cemetery)
50 Iila (cemetery)
51 Maidla II (cemetery)
52 Kurevere (cemetery)
53 Käku (cemetery)
54 Loona (cemetery)
55 Piila (cemetery)
56 Rahu (cemetery)
57 Randvere (cemetery)
58 Lahepera (cemetery)
59 Raatvere (cemetery)
60 Kuude (cemetery)
61 Salme ship burials (ship burial)
62 Viidumäe cult site (cult site)

The table below lists the sites in Estonia with evidence of use in the Pre-Viking and Viking Ages, following Andres Tvauri's survey of the period and the sources cited for each entry. It comprises 38 hillforts, six open and lake settlements, two harbour sites, 14 cemeteries, the Salme ship burials and the Viidumäe cult site; the numbers correspond to the markers on the map. Several forts are dated only broadly to the second half of the first millennium. Where the position of a site itself has not been published, the coordinates given are those of the nearest village and are marked "approx."

No.	Site	Type	County	Dating	Coordinates	Ref.
1	Padise	Hillfort	Harju	2nd half of 1st millennium; fort without settlement	59.2189°N 24.1425°E	
2	Iru	Hillfort	Harju	Pre-Viking–Viking Age; most active 9th c.; abandoned early 11th c.	59.4561°N 24.9033°E	
3	Kuusalu Pajulinn	Hillfort	Harju	Ring fort built in the Viking Age (c. 9th c.); abandoned 1st half of 11th c.	59.4509°N 25.4368°E	
4	Lohu II	Hillfort	Rapla	(9th?) 10th – 1st half of 11th c.	59.1404°N 24.7818°E	
5	Keava	Hillfort	Rapla	8th–9th c. and 10th – 1st half of 11th c. phases; later use to 1224	58.9509°N 24.9483°E	
6	Ahisilla	Hillfort	Harju	9th – 1st half of 11th c.	59.1943°N 25.1812°E	
7	Varangu	Hillfort	Lääne-Viru	2nd half of 1st millennium; dating imprecise	59.4860°N 26.3308°E	
8	Toolse Ussimägi	Hillfort	Lääne-Viru	Pre-Viking–Viking Age fort-and-settlement complex	59.5177°N 26.4542°E	
9	Kloodi Pahnimägi	Hillfort	Lääne-Viru	2nd half of 1st millennium; dating imprecise	59.4000°N 26.3021°E	
10	Rakvere (Tarvanpää)	Hillfort	Lääne-Viru	2nd half of 1st millennium; medieval castle on top	59.3483°N 26.3520°E	
11	Nurkse	Hillfort	Lääne-Viru	2nd half of 1st millennium; dating imprecise	59.3121°N 26.5655°E	
12	Pada II	Hillfort	Lääne-Viru	Pre-Viking and Viking Age rampart phases; settlement from 7th–8th c.	59.4307°N 26.7070°E	
13	Purtse Tarakallas	Hillfort	Ida-Viru	8th – early 13th c.	59.4092°N 27.0133°E	
14	Narva Joaorg	Hillfort	Ida-Viru	2nd half of 1st millennium; dating imprecise	59.3695°N 28.2079°E	
15	Kurista	Hillfort	Jõgeva	Built in the Viking Age (9th–10th c.); used to 13th c.	58.7409°N 26.3198°E	
16	Kassinurme	Hillfort	Jõgeva	Pre-Viking–Viking Age complex; ¹⁴C 10th–11th c.; used to 13th c.	58.7004°N 26.4512°E	
17	Peatskivi (Alatskivi)	Hillfort	Tartu	Pre-Viking–Viking Age complex	58.6070°N 27.1313°E	
18	Saadjärve	Hillfort	Tartu	Pre-Viking–Viking Age complex; ramparts 7th–11th c.	58.5372°N 26.7253°E	
19	Lähte Palalinn	Hillfort	Tartu	¹⁴C AD 600–980; abandoned 11th c.	58.4958°N 26.6944°E	
20	Tartu (Toomemägi)	Hillfort	Tartu	Fort-and-settlement by the Pre-Viking Age; Yuryev c. 1030; destroyed c. 1060	58.3790°N 26.7189°E	
21	Alt-Laari	Hillfort	Tartu	Founded Migration/Pre-Viking Age; abandoned 11th c.	58.2865°N 26.3246°E	
22	Unipiha	Hillfort	Tartu	Pre-Viking–Viking Age fort; abandoned 1st half of 11th c.	58.2475°N 26.6352°E	
23	Peedu	Hillfort	Tartu	Migration Period and Viking Age phases; abandoned 1st half of 11th c.	58.2422°N 26.4513°E	
24	Aakre	Hillfort	Tartu	Pre-Viking–Viking Age fort-and-settlement (dirhams); abandoned 1st half of 11th c.	58.0759°N 26.2345°E	
25	Otepää	Hillfort	Valga	Pre-Viking–Viking Age complex; enlarged 11th c.; medieval castle	58.0575°N 26.5041°E	
26	Tilleoru Kantsimägi	Hillfort	Põlva	Rampart ¹⁴C AD 915–977; abandoned 1st half of 11th c.	58.0131°N 26.9169°E	
27	Mõrgi	Hillfort	Võru	Roman Iron Age rampart; Viking Age occupation to c. 11th c.	57.9038°N 27.0898°E	
28	Karula (Rebäse)	Hillfort	Valga	Viking Age and Final Iron Age; last use early 13th c.	57.7425°N 26.3949°E	
29	Rõuge	Hillfort	Võru	Established 2nd half of 7th/8th c.; abandoned 1st half of 11th c.	57.7283°N 26.9323°E	
30	Viljandi	Hillfort	Viljandi	Pre-Viking–Viking Age complex; medieval castle on top	58.3592°N 25.5953°E	
31	Vooru	Hillfort	Viljandi	2nd half of 1st millennium; dirham find	58.1225°N 25.9605°E	
32	Tõrva Tantsumägi	Hillfort	Valga	Pre-Viking–Viking Age complex; used into Final Iron Age	57.9911°N 25.9219°E	
33	Lihula	Hillfort	Pärnu	¹⁴C 2nd half of 1st millennium; Viking Age use uncertain	58.6944°N 23.8388°E	
34	Soontagana	Hillfort	Pärnu	¹⁴C 2nd half of 1st millennium; Viking Age use uncertain	58.6615°N 24.1619°E	
35	Kärla Lihulinn	Hillfort	Saare	Founded in the Viking Age (¹⁴C 9th–10th c.); finds to 13th c.	58.3998°N 22.2519°E	
36	Asva	Hillfort	Saare	Bronze Age site; end rampart built in the Viking Age	58.4083°N 23.0175°E	
37	Truuta Nahaliin	Hillfort	Valga	Viking Age pottery; use may have ended c. 1030	57.9753°N 26.5780°E	
38	Nooska Talimägi	Hillfort	Võru	Migration Period; Viking Age phase 10th – 1st half of 11th c.	57.7779°N 26.9702°E	
39	Jägala-Joa IV	Settlement	Harju	Viking Age (Iru-type pottery, 8th–10th c.)	59.4597°N 25.1769°E (approx.)	
40	Kaberla	Settlement	Harju	First inhabited in the Viking Age (¹⁴C 971±80 BP)	59.4681°N 25.2508°E (approx.)	
41	Lehmja	Settlement	Harju	Founded Pre-Viking Age; Viking Age finds; used into Late Iron Age	59.3554°N 24.8831°E	
42	Aindu	Settlement	Viljandi	9th c. – Middle Ages	58.3981°N 25.5919°E (approx.)	
43	Olustvere	Settlement	Viljandi	Founded Pre-Viking Age; building ¹⁴C AD 716–971; Viking Age finds	58.5557°N 25.5661°E	
44	Koorküla Valgjärv lake settlement	Lake settlement	Valga	c. 7th–10th c. (¹⁴C; bridge pile AD 778–980)	57.9000°N 25.8700°E	
45	Tornimäe	Harbour site	Saare	9th–10th c.; abandoned c. 1000	58.5033°N 23.1214°E	
46	Viltina (harbour and Rutiränk grave-field)	Harbour site	Saare	Harbour 10th–11th (–12th) c.; grave-field late 10th–13th c.	58.3964°N 23.0291°E	
47	Ehmja Varetemägi	Cemetery	Lääne	5th–11th c.	58.8702°N 23.7560°E	
48	Keskvere III	Cemetery	Lääne	10th c. (richest Viking Age cremation in Estonia)	58.8197°N 23.8306°E (approx.)	
49	Uugla I	Cemetery	Lääne	2nd half of 10th c. – Final Iron Age	58.9883°N 23.7790°E	
50	Iila	Cemetery	Lääne-Viru	Inhumation of 2nd half of 10th c. in a tarand grave	59.4914°N 26.6583°E	
51	Maidla II	Cemetery	Rapla	Established 2nd half of 10th c.; used to 13th c. and later	58.9336°N 24.1369°E (approx.)	
52	Kurevere	Cemetery	Saare	Pre-Viking and Viking Age	58.4069°N 21.9936°E (approx.)	
53	Käku	Cemetery	Saare	10th – early 11th c.	58.3636°N 22.4867°E (approx.)	
54	Loona	Cemetery	Saare	Pre-Viking and Viking Age	58.3335°N 22.0193°E	
55	Piila	Cemetery	Saare	10th – early 11th c.	58.4078°N 22.5350°E (approx.)	
56	Rahu	Cemetery	Saare	2nd half of 10th c. onward	58.4264°N 22.8042°E (approx.)	
57	Randvere	Cemetery	Saare	2nd half of 10th c. onward	58.3917°N 23.0061°E (approx.)	
58	Lahepera	Cemetery	Tartu	Viking Age cremations; inhumations from 11th c.	58.5833°N 27.1617°E (approx.)	
59	Raatvere	Cemetery	Tartu	Cremations 10th c.; inhumations early/mid-11th c.	58.7429°N 27.0658°E	
60	Kuude	Cemetery	Viljandi	Viking Age	58.4006°N 25.7078°E (approx.)	
61	Salme ship burials	Ship burial	Saare	c. 700–750 (Pre-Viking Age)	58.1675°N 22.2506°E	
62	Viidumäe cult site	Cult site	Saare	c. 7th–9th c. (mainly Pre-Viking Age)	58.2958°N 22.0989°E (approx.)	

== Transition ==
The end of the Viking Age in Estonia is defined in the archaeological record by the following events:

- The abandonment of centres with a fort and a settlement
- The emergence of village settlements
- The appearance of new burial places
- The emergence of larger cemeteries
- The emergence of wheel-thrown pottery
- The emergence of Winter Rye in cultivation

By the 11th century, the Scandinavians are frequently chronicled as clashing with Estonian Vikings (Víkingr frá Esthland). After an extremely devastating raid against Denmark in 1170, which shocked most of Christian Europe, Pope Alexander III called for a crusade against the Estonians which would ultimately lead to German, Danish and Swedish participation in the Northern crusades and the Scandinavian conquest of Estonia in the 13th century by a Northern-European, Christian coalition of Sweden, Denmark and various German entities. Estonia was simultaneously invaded from 3 directions during their ancient independence war. The Danes landed in Northern-Estonia and according to legend, received their flag, the Dannebrog from the sky during the battle against Estonians. The Swedish invasion force was defeated a year later, nevertheless the Estonians were numerically overwhelmed by the Danish and German invaders and ran out of manpower during their ancient independence war which lasted 19 years. The end of the Viking Age can be attributed to the 1227 invasion of Saaremaa by the Livonian Brothers of the Sword who organized a major invasion in January. As the Oeselians were known as the infamous Estonian Vikings, who were a major naval power, then the crusaders were forced to invade the island during the winter as the frozen sea neutralized the navy of the Vikings. The Livonian Brothers of the Sword marched an army of 20,000 men over the frozen sea, the stronghold of Muhu was attacked first and completely destroyed. The crusader army then laid siege to Valjala and the defenders of the Valjala Stronghold were forced to surrender and accept Christianity. This surrender concluded the crusaders’ conquest of Estonia and stopped the constant raids, by the Estonian Vikings, which started in the 7th century at the latest.

The local tribes were eventually overwhelmed and underwent baptism, military occupation and sometimes extermination by German, Danish and Swedish forces.

== Notes ==
=== Citations ===
- Mägi, Marika (2018). In Austrvegr: The Role of the Eastern Baltic in Viking Age Communication across the Baltic Sea. BRILL. doi:10.1163/9789004363816. ISBN 9789004363816.
- Lang, Valter (2007). The Bronze and Early Iron Ages in Estonia (Estonian Archaeology). Tartu: University of Tartu Press. doi:10.26530/OAPEN_423939. ISBN 9789949117260.
- Tvauri, Andres (2012). The migration period, pre-viking age, and viking age in Estonia. Tartu University Press. ISBN 9789949199365. Archived from the original on 2022-03-27.
- Mägi, Marika (2015). "Chapter 4. Bound for the Eastern Baltic: Trade and Centres AD 800–1200". In Barrett, James H.; Gibbon, Sarah Jane (eds.). Maritime Societies of the Viking and Medieval World. Maney Publishing. pp. 41–46. ISBN 978-1-909662-79-7.
- Lang, Valter (2011), Traceless Death. Missing Burials in Bronze and Iron Age Estonia., Estonia: Estonian Journal of Archaeology, pp. 109–129
- Urlanis, B T︠S︡ (1941). Rost naselenii︠a︡ v Evrope : opyt ischislenii︠a︡ [Population growth in Europe] (in Russian). Moskva: OGIZ-Gospolitizdat. OCLC 42379320.
- "Palverännak – The Iru hill fort". www.palverand.ee. Archived from the original on 14 September 2019.
- Larsson, Gunilla (2007). Ship and society: maritime ideology in Late Iron Age Sweden. Uppsala Universitet, Department of Archaeology and Ancient History. ISBN 9789150619157.
- Leslie-Jacobsen, Helen; Hopkins, Joseph (2015), "The Situation of Finnic Languages in the Iron Age, Part I", RMN Newsletter 9: 64–115
- Sturleson, Snorri (1838). Snorre Sturlesons norske Kongers Sagaer (in Danish). Guldberg.
- Martens, Irmelin (2004), "Indigenous and imported Viking Age weapons in Norway – a problem with European implications" (PDF), Journal of Nordic Archaeological Science, 14: 125–137, archived from the original (PDF) on 17 October 2021
- Frucht, R. (2004), Eastern Europe: an introduction to the people, lands, and culture., Santa Barbara: ABC-CLIO
- Rannamäe, Eve; Valk, Heiki; Kama, Pikne; Olli, Maarja (2012), "Excavations on the hill forts of south-eastern Estonia: Kõivuküla, Märdi, Truuta and Aakre", Arheoloogilised Välitööd Eestis (Archeological Fieldwork in Estonia): 27–46
- Kivirüüt, Ann; Olli, Maarja (2015), "Archaeological research on Aakre Kivivare tarand-grave" (PDF), Archeological Fieldwork in Estonia: 29–70
- Tõnisson, Evald; Mäesalu, Ain; Valk, Heiki; Solnask, Helle; Kool, Jaana (2008). Eesti muinaslinnad (Prehistoric strongholds of Estonia) (in Estonian). Tartu èUlikool. pp. 313–314. ISBN 9789985405383.
- Roio, Maili (2007). "New Interpretations of Settlement Remains in Lake Valgjärv of Koorküla, Estonia". Journal of Wetland Archaeology. 7 (1): 23–32. doi:10.1179/jwa.2007.7.1.23. S2CID 129305049.
- Oll, M. (2 July 2015). "Intriguing Viking Age underwater structure draws international interest". ERR. Eesti Rahvusringhääling.
- Karro, Krista (11 March 2015). "Continuing Landscape, Continuing Life: Burial Site of Lahepera in Eastern Estonia". Papers from the Institute of Archaeology. 25 (1). Art. 4. doi:10.5334/pia.480.
- Tvauri, Andres (2012b). "Archaeological Finds from the Hill Fort at Keava" (PDF). Estonian Journal of Archaeology. 1 (16): 36. doi:10.3176/arch.2012.supv1.03.
- Kriiska, Aivar; Sikk, Kaare (2014). "Archaeological test excavations at the Mesolithic and Iron Age settlement site Jägala-Joa IV" (PDF). Archaeological Field Works in Estonia (2013): 45–54. ISSN 1406-3972.
- Abercromby, John (1898). The Pre- and Proto-historic Finns, Both Eastern and Western: With the Magic Songs of the West Finns. David Nutt. p. 141.
- Sturluson, Snorri (1230). The Heimskringla: Or, Chronicle of the Kings of Norway.
- Johnson, Brent Landon (14 March 2014). Víkingar frá Eistlandi: Austmarr in the Old Icelandic Sagas. Yale Baltic and Scandinavian Studies Conference 2014. Yale University.
- Baronas, Darius (28 March 2014). "LDK istorija: Prekyba belaisviais – pajamų šaltinis" [The History of GDL: Slave Trade — Source of Income]. 15min (in Lithuanian).
- Leimus, Ivar; Molvogin, Arkady (2001). Sylloge of coins of the British Isles. Oxford University Press. ISBN 978-0-19-726220-7.
- Christiansen, Eric (1998). The northern Crusades (2nd, new ed.). Penguin. ISBN 978-0-14-026653-5.
- Mägi, Marika; Jets, Indrek (2015), Local shape, foreign decoration, shared cultural values in dress pins from the Viidumäe sacrificial site on Saaremaa (PDF), archived from the original (PDF) on 11 October 2018
- Curry, Andrew (10 June 2013). "The First Vikings – Archaeology Magazine". www.archaeology.org. Archaeological Institute of America.
