= Iru (village) =

Village in Estonia

- village
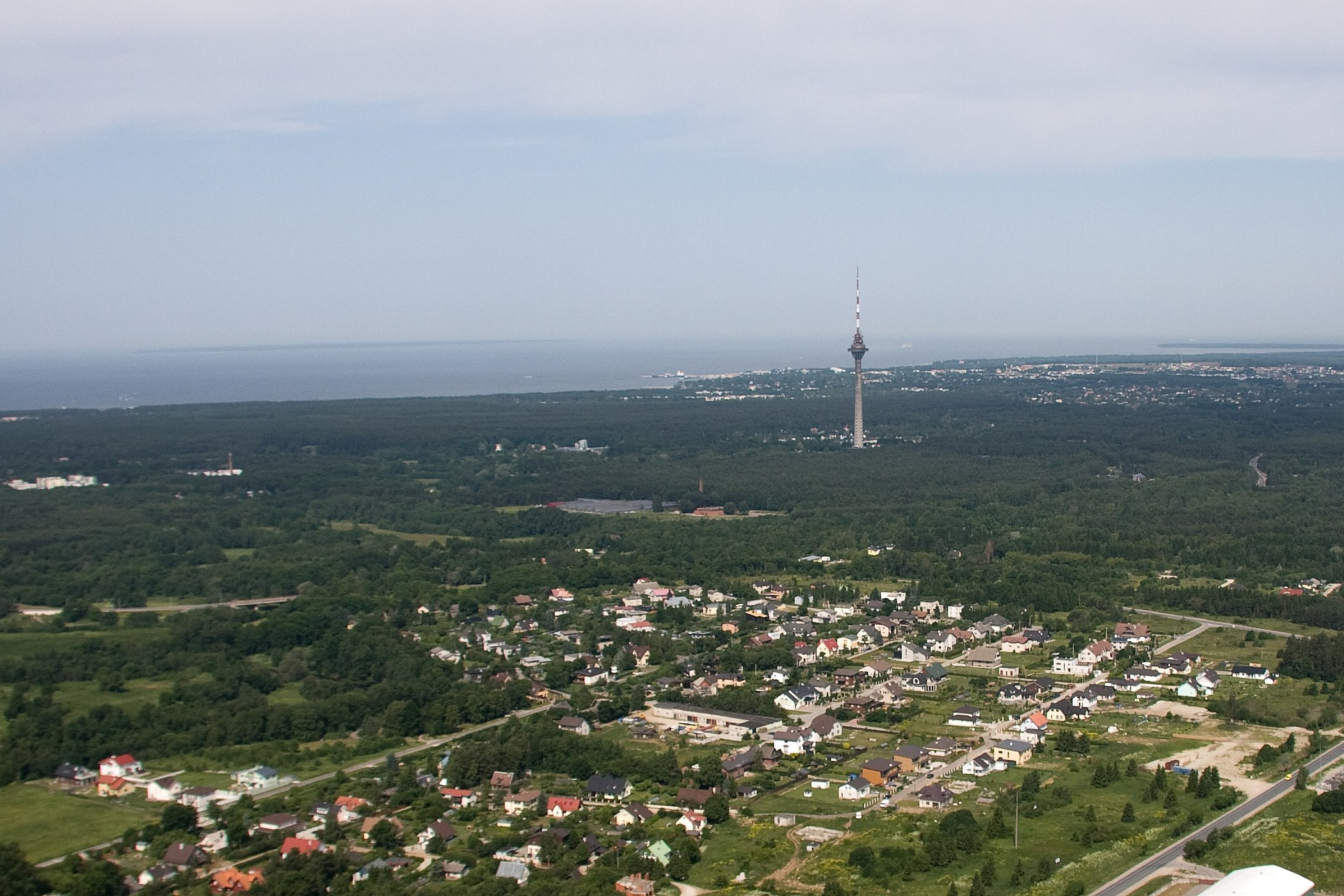
- Iru

- Location within Estonia
- Coordinates: 59°27′27.07″N 24°54′39.74″E
- Country: Estonia
- Counties of Estonia: Harju County
- Parish: Jõelähtme Parish
- First settled: 2000 BC
- First mentioned: 1241

Population (01.01.2009)
  - Total: 331

Iru is a village in Jõelähtme Parish, Harju County, Estonia. It has a population of 331 (as of 1 January 2009).

The first written records in the Danish Census Book mentioning Iru date back to 1241.

== See also ==
- Pirita River
- Iru hill fort
- Iru Power Plant
- Iru, Tallinn
