= Estonian Islamic Centre =

Mosque in Tallinn, Harju, Estonia

- Eesti Islami Keskus
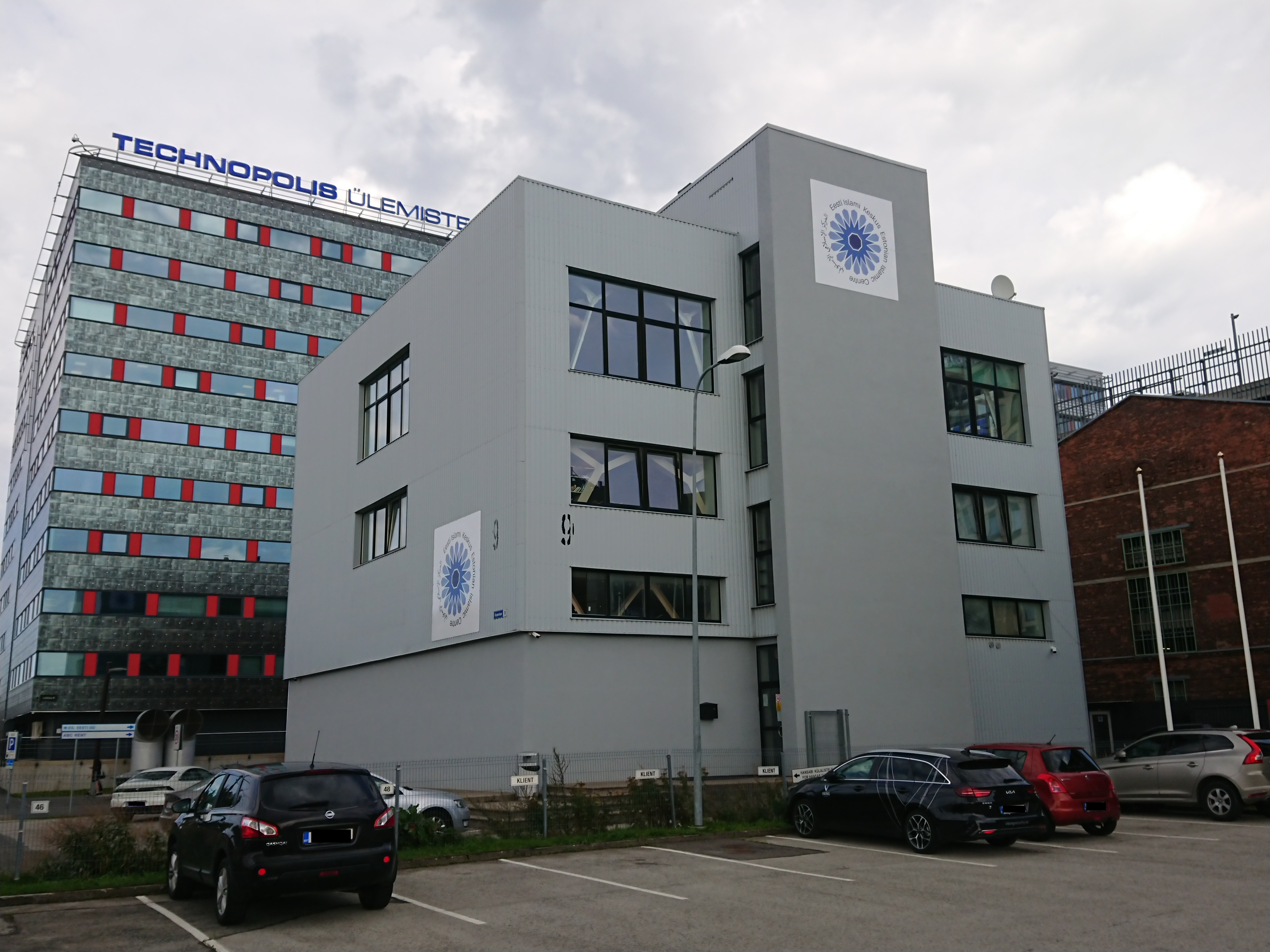

- Location of the mosque in Estonia

Religion
- Affiliation: Sunni Islam
- Ecclesiastical or organizational status: Mosque
- Status: Active

Location
- Location: Lasnamäe, Tallinn, Harju
- Country: Estonia
- Interactive map of Estonian Islamic Centre
- Coordinates: 59°25′13″N 24°48′00″E

Architecture
- Type: Office block
- Founder: Estonian Islamic Congregation
- Completed: 2008

The Estonian Islamic Centre (Estonian: Eesti Islami Keskus) is a mosque in Lasnamäe District, Tallinn, Harju County, Estonia.

== Overview ==
The mosque logo

The Estonian Islamic Centre was established in 2008 by the Estonian Islamic Congregation, a non-profit organization that represents the Muslim community in Estonia. The centre is open to people of all faiths and backgrounds and serves as a place for prayer, cultural events, and educational activities.

The mosque is housed in an office block in the city's Lasnamäe district, and is accessible within walking distance southeast of Ülemiste Station of Elron.

== See also ==
- Islam in Estonia
- List of mosques in Estonia
