= Maidla, Märjamaa Parish =

Village in Estonia

Coordinates: 58°56′01″N 24°08′13″E

Maidla
- Village
- Interactive map of Maidla
- Country: Estonia
- County: Rapla County
- Parish: Märjamaa Parish
- Time zone: UTC+2 (EET)
  - Summer (DST): UTC+3 (EEST)

Maidla (German: Tockumbeck) is a village in Märjamaa Parish, Rapla County in western Estonia.
