= Iru hillfort =

Hillfort in Tallinn, Estonia

Coordinates: 59°27′23″N 24°54′13″E

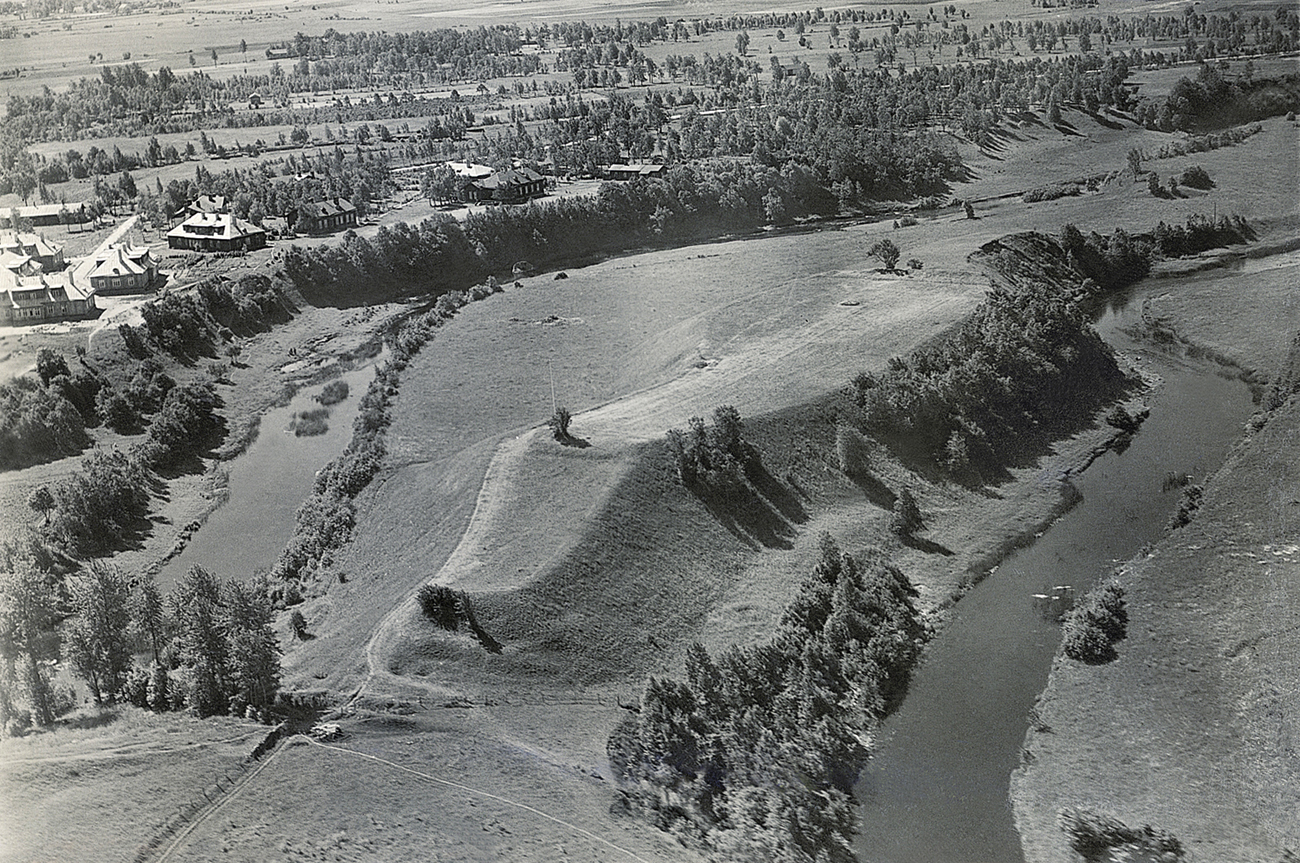
Iru hillfort in the 1920–1930s

The Iru hillfort (Estonian: Iru linnamägi or Iru Linnapära) is an ancient hillfort located in Tallinn, Estonia. First established in the Bronze Age, it was a major hillfort in Ancient Estonia, and is on the banks of the Pirita river near to Estonia's northern coast.

The Iru hillfort was at the height of its prosperity during the Viking Age, before starting to decline in the 10th century as settlement grew in Tallinn Old Town. Iru is commonly described as the predecessor of the modern Estonian capital Tallinn, and today lies within Tallinn's city limits.

== Description ==
The Iru hillfort is located on the bank of the Pirita river, 8.5 km (5.3 mi) from Tallinn Old Town. It was a good defensive position, on a high and steep hill within a U-shaped bend of the Pirita, about 4–5 km (2.5–3.1 mi) inland from the river mouth at the Tallinn Bay.

The hillfort has an elongated shape, with a length of 212.5 m (697 ft) and a width varying between 16–52 m (52–171 ft). There are ramparts on both ends, and also a central rampart that divides the hillfort into a smaller northern plateau with an area of 1,100 m^{2} (12,000 sq ft), and a larger southern plateau with an area of 4,000 m^{2} (43,000 sq ft). The eastern side is 9–11 m (30–36 ft) high from the foot of the hill, while the western side has a height of 10–12 m (33–39 ft) from the foot of the hill at northern plateau, and 18 m (59 ft) at southern plateau dropping directly to the river.

== History ==
Human settlement on the Iru hill can be traced back to Corded Ware culture during the 3rd millennium BC. The hillfort was first established during the Bronze Age, roughly between 800 BC and 500 BC. Iru re-emerged around the 5th or 6th century, with its prosperity peaking during the Viking Age. There is no consensus among archaeologists about the exact nature of the hillfort during this period. Valter Lang suggested concentration of population into an agrarian settlement, while Marika Mägi alternatively proposed that hillfort functioned primarily as a central marketplace, with permanent settlement being limited only to local magnates' farms, or even just limited guard presence. Iru's location on the northern coast of Estonia placed it on a trade route towards Russia and other areas further east and south. Iru started losing its prominence around the 10th century, although archaeological findings like coins, the nature of major stone walls, and a tower suggest continued limited use during the 11th and 12th centuries. Around the same period, a settlement was established at the location of Tallinn Old Town, with a hillfort built on Toompea. The Iru hillfort is frequently described as the predecessor of Tallinn.

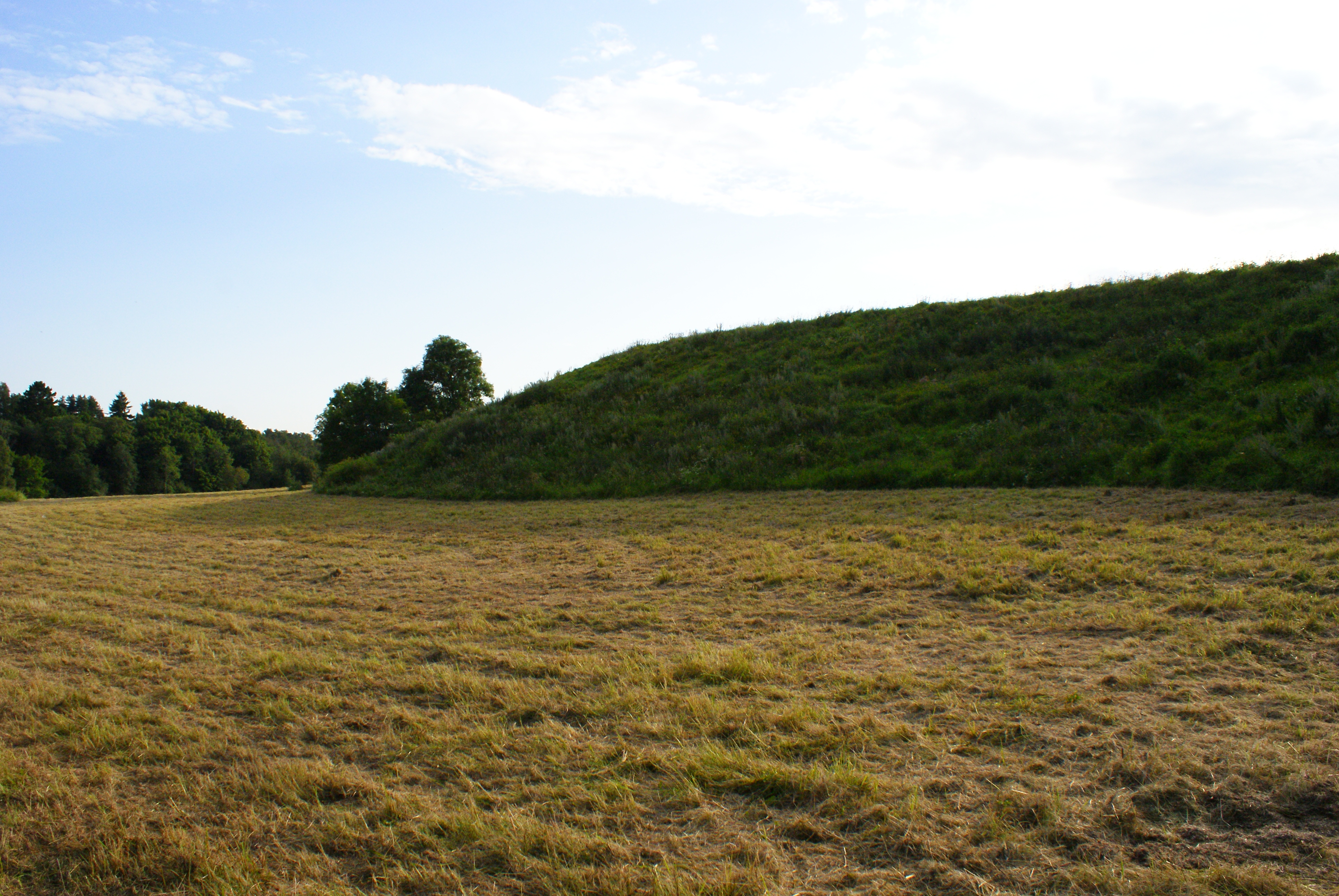
Iru hillfort

The Iru hillfort was discovered in the early 20th century, when a story about Iru in the Estonian national epic Kalevipoeg caught the attention of Baltic German teacher Artur Spreckelsen, who suggested that the site may have been an ancient hillfort; the idea was publicized in a 1922 newspaper article and lecture. The first excavations on the hillfort started in 1936. In the 1930s, excavations were led by Artur Vassar and partially also by Richard Indreko. During 1952–1958, major excavations took place under Vassar's leadership. Valter Lang excavated the central wall during 1984–1986, and in 1994 he published the results of the different excavations that had taken place on the hillfort. Nowadays, the hillfort is used for walks and other recreational activities.

== Bibliography ==
- Kurisoo, Tuuli; Lillak, Anu; Rõigas, Andres; Tint, Küllike (2023). "The role of communities in preserving, using and remembering heritage: archaeological monuments and dark heritage sites in Estonia". International Journal of Heritage Studies. 30 (2). Taylor & Francis: 195–209. doi:10.1080/13527258.2023.2284733.
- Lang, Valter (1996). Muistne Rävala: Muistised, kronoloogia ja maaviljelusliku asustuse kujunemine Loode-Eestis, eriti Pirita jõe alamjooksu piirkonnas [Prehistoric Rävala: antiquities, chronology and the establishment of farming settlement in North-West Estonia, with special reference to the area on the lower reaches of the Pirita River] (in Estonian). Estonian Academy of Sciences. ISBN 9985501462.
- Mägi, Marika (2007). "Iru linnusest Püha Birgitta kloostrini. Merenduslik kultuurmaastik Pirita jõe alamjooksul" [From the Hill-Fort of Iru to the Convent of St. Birgitta. Maritime Cultural Landscape on the Lower Reaches of the Pirita River] (PDF). Studies on Art and Architecture (in Estonian). 16 (4). Estonian Society of Art Historians. ISSN 1406-2860.
- Mägi, Marika (2015). "Bound for the Eastern Baltic: Trade and Centres ad 800—1200". In Barret, James H.; Gibbon, Sarah Jane (eds.). Maritime Societies of the Viking and Medieval World. Maney Publishing. ISBN 9781909662797.
