= Iru, Tallinn =

Subdistrict of Tallinn, Estonia

Coordinates: 59.461635°N 24.901049°E

Iru
- Subdistrict of Tallinn
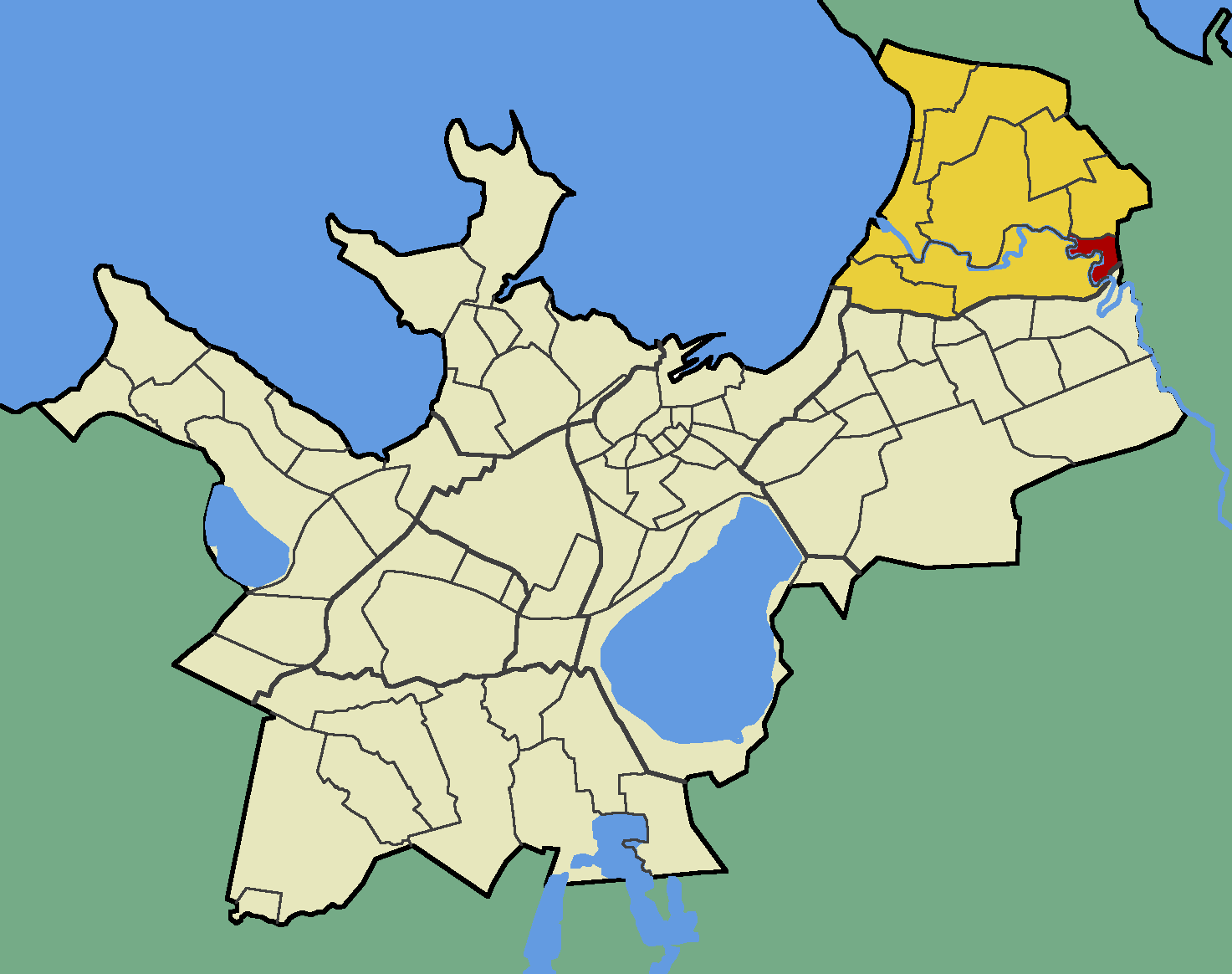
- Iru within Pirita District.
- Country: Estonia
- County: Harju County
- City: Tallinn
- District: Pirita

Population (01.01.2015)
  - Total: 35

Iru is a subdistrict (Estonian: asum) in the district of Pirita, Tallinn, the capital of Estonia. It has a population of 35 (As of 1 January 2015).

== See also ==
- Iru (Jõelähtme Parish)
- Pirita River
- Iru Power Plant
