= List of mosques in Europe =

This is a partial list of mosques in Europe.

Name	Images	Country	City	Year	Group	Remarks
List of mosques in Albania		Albania				
List of mosques in Armenia		Armenia				
List of mosques in Azerbaijan		Azerbaijan				
Telfs mosque		Austria	Telfs	1998	DITIB	Minaret later built in 2006
Vienna Islamic Centre		Austria	Vienna	1977	U	Built in order of rey Faisal ibn Abd al-Aziz.
Rasheed Mosque		Austria	Vienna	2005	U	Built by Muslims of Ghana, Nigeria and Benin.
Mosque Bad Vöslau		Austria	Bad Vöslau	?	DITIB	Construction started in 2008.
Great Mosque of Brussels		Belgium	Brussels	1879, 1978	SA	The original building was built to form the East Pavilion of the National Exhibition in Brussels in 1880.
Mosque Lebbeke		Belgium	Lebbeke	?	U	51°1′9″N 4°5′40″E
Selimiye Mosque		Belgium	Brussels	2015	U	
List of mosques in Bosnia and Herzegovina		Bosnia and Herzegovina				
El Haj Huseyin Mosque		Bulgaria	Belogradchik	1757—1758	U	
Dzhumaya Mosque		Bulgaria	Plovdiv	1364	U	
Ibrahim Pasha Mosque		Bulgaria	Razgrad	1616	U	
Tombul Mosque		Bulgaria	Shumen	1740–1744	U	
Banya Bashi Mosque		Bulgaria	Sofia	1576	U	
Ebu Bekir Mosque (Eski Cami)		Bulgaria	Yambol	1413	U	
List of mosques in Cyprus		Cyprus				
Zagreb Mosque		Croatia	Zagreb	1987	U	
Brno Mosque		Czech Republic	Brno	1998	U	
Prague Mosque		Czech Republic	Prague	1999	U	
List of mosques in Denmark		Denmark				
List of mosques in France		France				
The Islamic Society of Finland Mosque		Finland	Helsinki	?	U	
Järvenpää Mosque		Finland	Järvenpää	1942	U	First mosque in the Nordic countries
List of mosques in Germany		Germany				
Ibrahim-al-Ibrahim Mosque		Gibraltar (British overseas territory)	Gibraltar	1997	SA	August 8, 1997 (also known as: King Fahd bin Abdulaziz al-Saud Mosque)
List of mosques in Greece		Greece	Didymoteicho	15th Century	Ottoman	
List of mosques in Hungary		Hungary				
Reykjavík Mosque		Iceland	Reykjavík	2002	U	Also home to the Félag Múslima á Íslandi (Association of Muslims in Iceland)
Dublin Mosque		Ireland	Dublin	1976	U	
Omar Mosque		Italy	Catania (via Castromarino)	1980	Private mosque opened by Michele Papa with Libyan funding. Closed since 1990	
Mosque of Segrate		Italy	Segrate (Milan)	1988	U	Managed by the "Centro islamico di Milano e Lombardia" (UCOII)
Mosque of Palermo		Italy	Palermo	1990	U	Property and managed by the Embassy of Tunisia; occupies the former church of San Paolino dei giardinieri
Mosque of Rome		Italy	Rome	1995	SA	Managed by the Centro islamico culturale d'Italia. Largest mosque in Europe till 2012.
Mosque of Mercy		Italy	Catania	2012	U	Managed by the Comunità Islamica di Sicilia (UCOII)
Mosque of Albenga		Italy	Albenga	2013	U	UCOII
"King Mohamed VI" Mosque of Turin		Italy	Turin	2013	U	Managed by the Centro Culturale Islamico d'Italia (CCII), partly co-funded by Morocco
Ravenna Mosque		Italy	Ravenna	2013	U	Managed by the Centro di cultura e studi islamici della Romagna (CCSIR); partly co-funded by Qatar
Mosque of Colle Val d'Elsa		Italy	Colle Val d'Elsa (Siena)	2013	U	Managed by Associazione Comunità dei Musulmani di Siena e Provincia; partly co-funded by Qatar
Forlì Mosque		Italy	Forlì	2017	U	Managed by Centro culturale islamico di Forlì; self-funded
Ahmadi Mosque		Italy	San Pietro in Casale (Bologna)	?	Managed by the Ahmadi community	
Hadum Mosque		Kosovo	Gjakovë	1594	OT	
Mariam Al-Batool Mosque		Malta	Paola	1978	WICS	The only mosque in the Maltese Islands
Hussein Pasha Mosque		Montenegro	Pljevlja	?	U	
Sailors' Mosque		Montenegro	Ulcinj	1798	U	Destroyed in 1931, rebuilt between 2008 and 2012
Podgorica Mosque		Montenegro	Podgorica	?	U	
List of mosques in the Nagorno-Karabakh		Azerbaijan				
List of mosques in the Netherlands		Netherlands				
N.N.		North Macedonia	Ohrid	?	U	
Aladja Mosque		North Macedonia	Skopje	1438	U	
Işak Bey Mosque		North Macedonia	Skopje		U	
Mustapha Pasha Mosque		North Macedonia	Skopje	1492	U	
Coloured Mosque in Tetovo		North Macedonia	Tetovo	1495	U	
List of mosques in Norway		Norway				
Bohoniki Mosque		Poland	Bohoniki	19/20th century	U	pl:Meczet w Bohonikach
Gdańsk Mosque		Poland	Gdańsk	1989	U	pl:Meczet w Gdańsku
Kruszyniany Mosque		Poland	Kruszyniany	18/19th century	U	pl:Meczet w Kruszynianach
Poznań Mosque		Poland	Poznań	2005	U	pl:Meczet w Poznaniu
Warsaw Mosque		Poland	Warsaw	1993	U	pl:Meczet w Warszawie
Warsaw Islamic Center		Poland	Warsaw	2015	U	pl:Ośrodek Kultury Muzułmańskiej w Warszawie
Muslim Cultural and Educational Center		Poland	Wrocław	2004	U	pl:Muzułmańskie Centrum Kulturalno-Oświatowe we Wrocławiu
Lisbon Mosque		Portugal	Lisbon	1988	U	
Grand Mosque of Constanța		Romania	Constanţa	1912	U	
Esmahan Sultan Mosque		Romania	Mangalia	1575	U	
Abdul Medgid Mosque		Romania	Medgidia	1859	U	
Ali-Gazi Pasha Mosque		Romania	Babadag	1610	U	
Maryam Mosque		Romania	Rediu	2014	U	Established for Romanian converts to Islam.
List of mosques in Russia		Russia				
Ljubljana Mosque		Slovenia	Ljubljana	2020		
Bajrakli Mosque		Serbia	Belgrade	1575	U	Built around 1575
Almonaster Mosque		Spain	Almonaster la Real	9-10th century	U	Now a Christian chapel (es:).
Mosque–Cathedral of Córdoba		Spain	Córdoba	784	U	“Great Mosque of Cordoba”, now a Catholic cathedral
Al-Morabito Mosque		Spain	Córdoba	1936	U	Constructed by the Nationalists for the Regulares at the Spanish Civil War; 37°53′24″N 4°46′41″W
Fuengirola Mosque		Spain	Fuengirola	1994	SA	(es:); 36°31′52″N 4°37′37″W
Great Mosque of Granada		Spain	Granada	2003	U	(es:). 37°10′52″N 3°35′37″W
Omar Mosque		Spain	Madrid	1992	SA	Also known as M-30 Mosque (es:). 40°26′18″N 3°39′26″W
Madrid Central Mosque		Spain	Madrid	1988	UCIDE	Also known as Abu-Bakr Mosque
Al-Andalus Mosque		Spain	Málaga	2009	SA	(es:); 36°46′9″N 4°26′18″W
King Abdelaziz Mosque		Spain	Marbella	1981	SA	36°30′15″N 4°55′38″W
Bab al-Mardum Mosque		Spain	Toledo	999	U	Historical mosque, converted into Holy Cross Chapel
Tornerías Mosque		Spain	Toledo	Middle of the 11th century	U	Historical mosque, converted into the cultural center Centro de Promoción de la Artesanía de Castilla-La Mancha
Great Mosque of Valencia		Spain	Valencia	1994	U	39°28′42″N 0°21′10″W
List of mosques in Sweden		Sweden				
Mahmood Mosque		Switzerland	Zürich	1963	AMJ	First mosque in Switzerland.
Geneva Mosque		Switzerland	Geneva	1978	U	Inaugurated by Khalid ibn Abd al-Aziz.
Winterthur Mosque		Switzerland	Winterthur	?	U	Mosque of an Islamic-Albanian community.
List of mosques in Turkey		Turkey				
The Big Khan Mosque		Ukraine	Bakhchysarai	1532	SDMC	
Ismi Khan Jami Mosque		Ukraine	Bakhchysarai	17th—18th century	U	
Molla-Mustafa Jami Mosque		Ukraine	Bakhchysarai	?	U	
Orta Juma Jami		Ukraine	Bakhchysarai	1674	U	
Tahtali-Jami Mosque		Ukraine	Bakhchysarai	1707	U	
Ahat Jami Mosque		Ukraine	Donetsk	1993	U	
Mufti-Jami Mosque		Ukraine	Feodosiya	1637	U	
Kharkiv Cathedral Mosque		Ukraine	Kharkiv	1993	U	
Ar-Rahma Mosque, Kyiv		Ukraine	Kyiv	2000	SDMU	
Luhansk Cathedral Mosque		Ukraine	Luhansk	2010	U	
Sultan Suleiman Mosque		Ukraine	Mariupol	2007	T	
Al-Salam Mosque		Ukraine	Odesa	2000	U	
Kyiv Islamic Cultural Center		Ukraine	Kyiv	2001	U	
Kebir-Jami Mosque		Ukraine	Simferopol	1508	SDMC	
Kokkoz Jami Mosque		Ukraine	Sokolyne	1910	U	
Ozbek Han Mosque		Ukraine	Staryi Krym	1314	T	
Juma-Jami Mosque		Ukraine	Yevpatoria	1552—1564	SDMC	Designed by Mimar Sinan
List of mosques in the United Kingdom		United Kingdom				

Group

AAIIL	Lahore Ahmadiyya Movement for the Propagation of Islam
AMJ	Ahmadiyya Muslim Jamaat
DITIB	Turkish-Islamic Union for Religious Affairs
IZA	Islamic Centre Aachen
IZM	Islamic Centre Munich
JI	Jamaat-e-Islami
WICS	World Islamic Call Society
SA	Saudi Arabia (Wahhabism)
SDMС	Ukraine (Spiritual Direction of the Muslims of Crimea)
SDMU	Ukraine (The Spiritual Direction of the Muslims of Ukraine)
TJ	Tablighi Jamaat
T	Turkish group
UCIDE	Union of Islamic Communities of Spain
U	Unknown

== See also ==
- Lists of mosques
- Islam in Europe
