= Luhansk (disambiguation) =

Luhansk or Lugansk is a city in Ukraine.

Luhansk (Ukrainian: Луганськ) or Lugansk (Russian: Луганск) may also refer to:

== Places ==
- Luhansk Raion, a prospective district of Ukraine
- Luhansk Oblast, a province of Ukraine with the eponymous city as its capital
- Luhansk People's Republic, a largely unrecognized federal subject of Russia and former breakaway state

=== Facilities and structures ===
- Luhansk International Airport, Luhansk, Luhansk Oblast, Ukraine
- Luhansk railway station, Luhansk, Luhansk Oblast, Ukraine
- University of Luhansk, Luhansk, Luhansk Oblast, Ukraine; also known as Lugansk National University (LNU)
- Luhansk Cathedral Mosque, Luhansk, Luhansk Oblast, Ukraine
- Luhansk power station, Shchastia, Luhansk Oblast, Ukraine
- Luhansk Border Base, Luhansk, Luhansk Oblast, Ukraine; besieged by separatists in 2014 during the Siege of the Luhansk Border Base

== Other uses ==
- Luhansk Regional Committee of the Communist Party of Ukraine, Luhansk Oblast, Ukraine, USSR
- Luhansk People's Republic national football team, a soccer team
- Lugansk Airlines, a defunct Ukrainian airline based in Luhansk

== See also ==
- Luhansk State Medical University, Luhansk, Luhansk Oblast, Ukraine
- Luhansk State University of Internal Affairs, Luhansk, Luhansk Oblast, Ukraine
- Lugansk Higher Military Aviation School of Navigators, Luhansk, Luhansk Oblast, Ukraine
