= Mufti-Jami Mosque =

Sunni mosque in Feodosia, Crimea

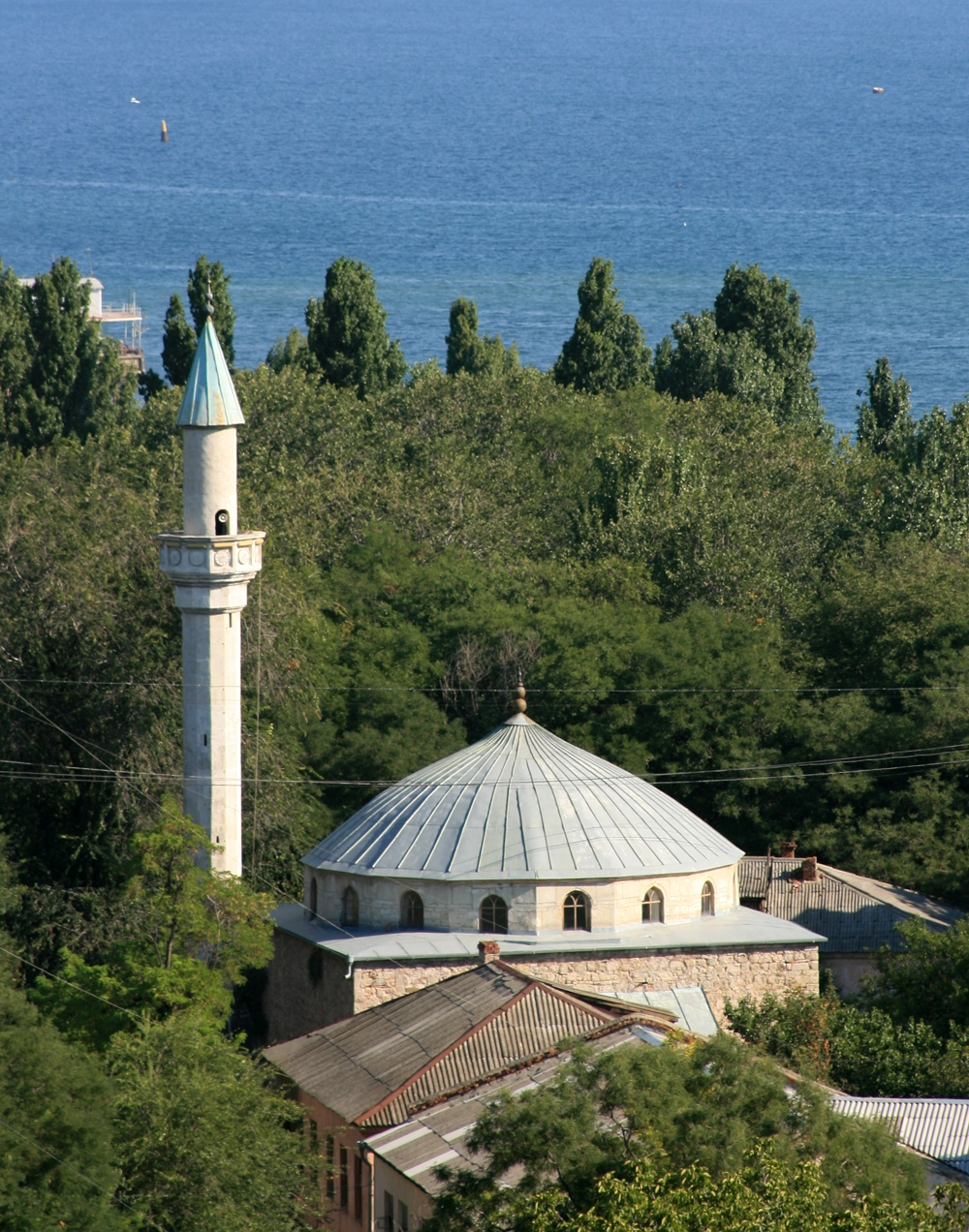

Religion
- Affiliation: Islam
- Rite: Sunni
- Status: Active

Location
- Location: Feodosia
- Interactive map of Mufti-Jami Mosque
- Territory: (Autonomous Republic of Crimea) AR Crimea (de jure) (Autonomous Republic of Crimea) Republic of Crimea (de facto)
- Coordinates: 45°01′19″N 35°23′30″E

Architecture
- Type: Mosque
- Style: Ottoman architecture
- Completed: 1637

Specifications
- Direction of façade: North
- Dome: 1
- Minaret: 1
- Materials: Brick, Limestone

The Mufti-Jami Mosque, (Crimean Tatar: Müfti Cami, Ukrainian: Муфті Джамі, Russian: Муфти-Джами, Turkish: Müftü Camii) is located in a neighborhood of Feodosia, Crimea, sometimes called “Little Istanbul” in the southwestern part of the old city.

== Structure ==
The main part of the building is a square plan of about 16 by 16 meters covered by a dome. The main entrance is from the north, with a portal framed by windows and mihrab niches; another entrance is from the west. Inside the building, facing the main entrance is a rectangular mihrab of about 7 by 3 meters. The minaret is at the northwestern corner of the building.

== History ==
The mosque was commissioned by a person named Mûsâ in 1623 and finished by 1639.

The mosque was not destroyed during the Russian invasion of 1783, unlike most Ottoman-era buildings in the city. After the invasion, the mosque was used as a Russian Orthodox church and later as an Armenian Catholic church. Since the building was not in use as a mosque at the time, it survived the mass deportation of Tatars in 1944.

Some restoration was done in 1967. The interior walls had been decorated with hand-painted designs from its years as a church, but when the building underwent restoration in 1975, these were plastered over. The minaret was rebuilt in 1976 on its old base. Restoration may have continued till 1980.

The mosque was reopened for Muslim worship in 1995, and the designs under the plaster were brought into the open again. Regular worship has continued since 1998.

In the courtyard of the building are the ruins of a structure called a tomb. This may be one of the two places of pilgrimage (ziyaretgâh) mentioned by Evliya Çelebi, those of Şehid Baba and Şeyh Ebûbekir. Around the mosque a few broken gravestones remain; other gravestones have been moved to the city museum.

== Photos ==
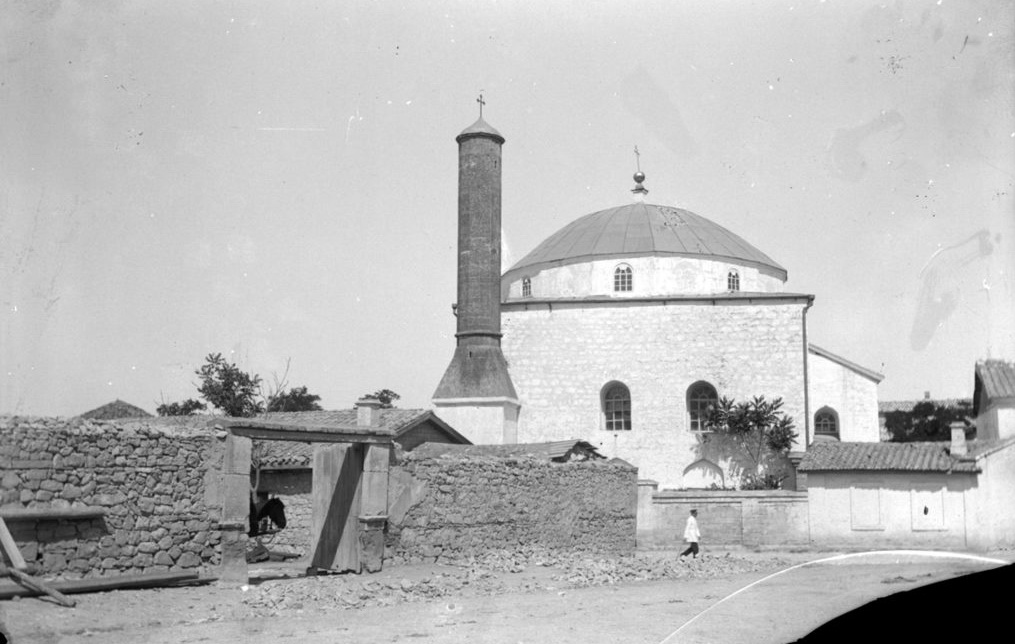
Mufti-Jami Mosque when it was a Christian church, photo 1897

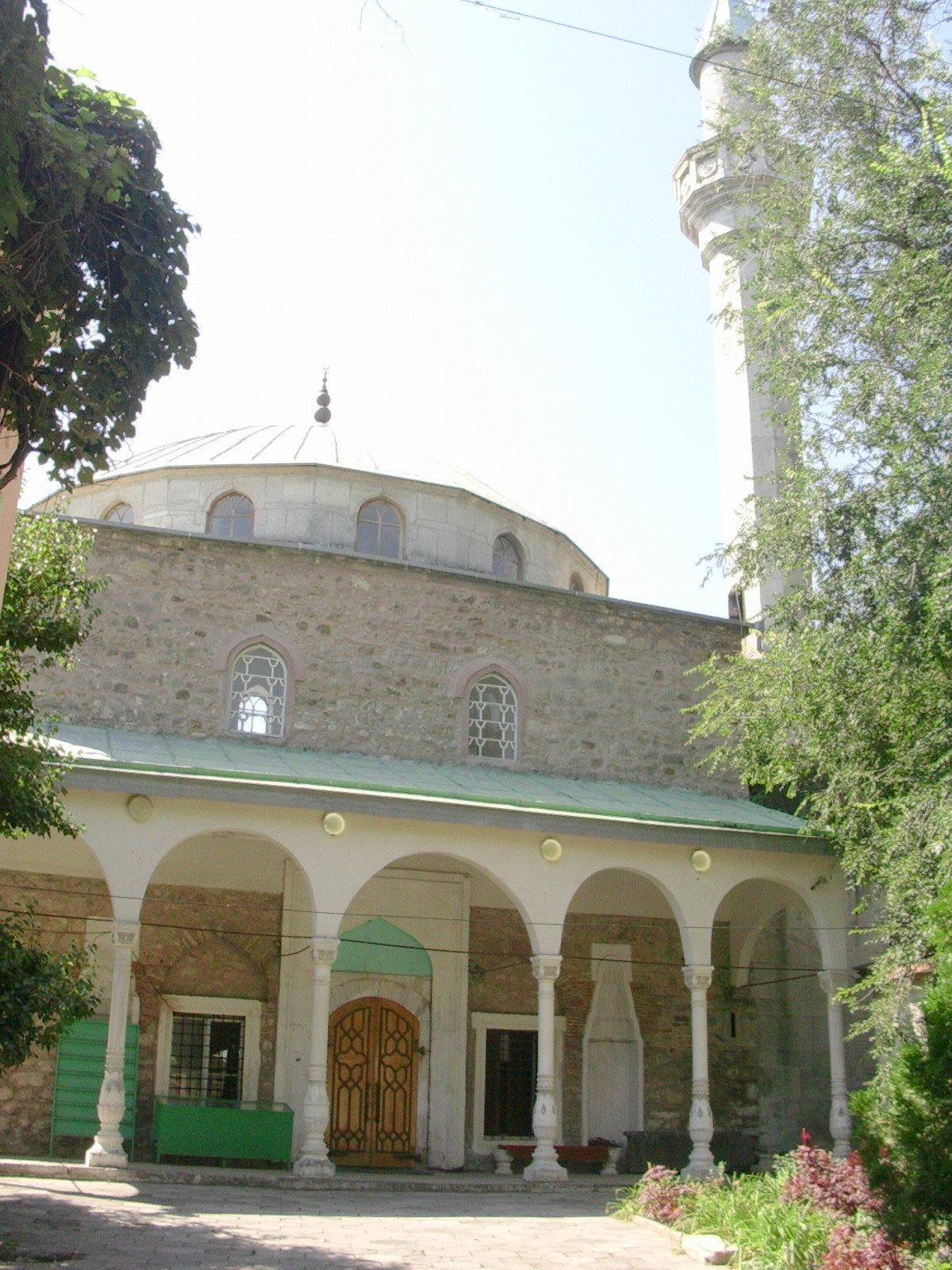
Facade

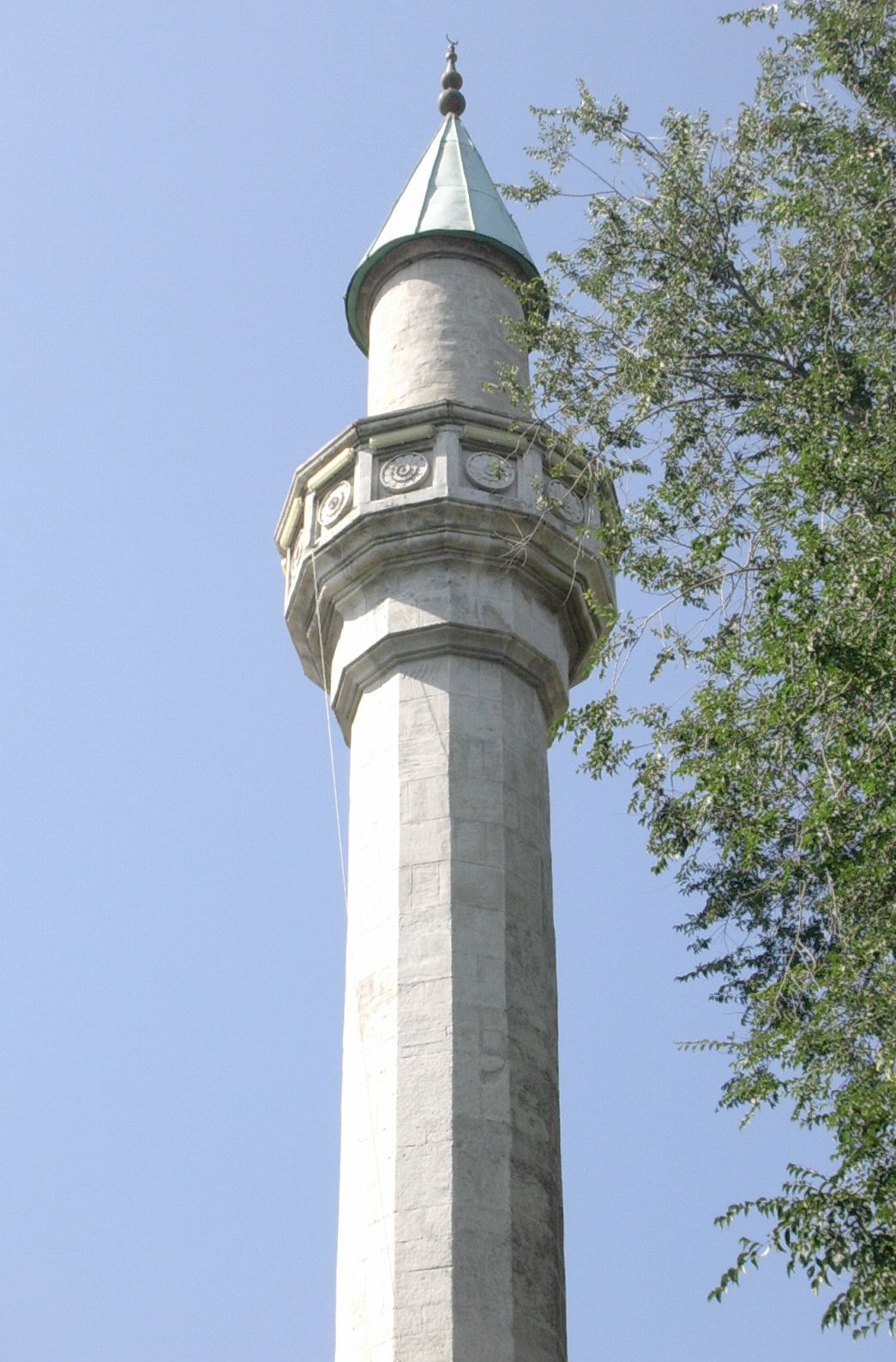
Minaret

== See also ==
- Religion in Crimea
- Islam in Ukraine
- Islam in Russia
- List of mosques in Russia
- List of mosques in Europe
