= Orta Cami Mosque =

Sunni mosque in Bakhchisaray, Crimea

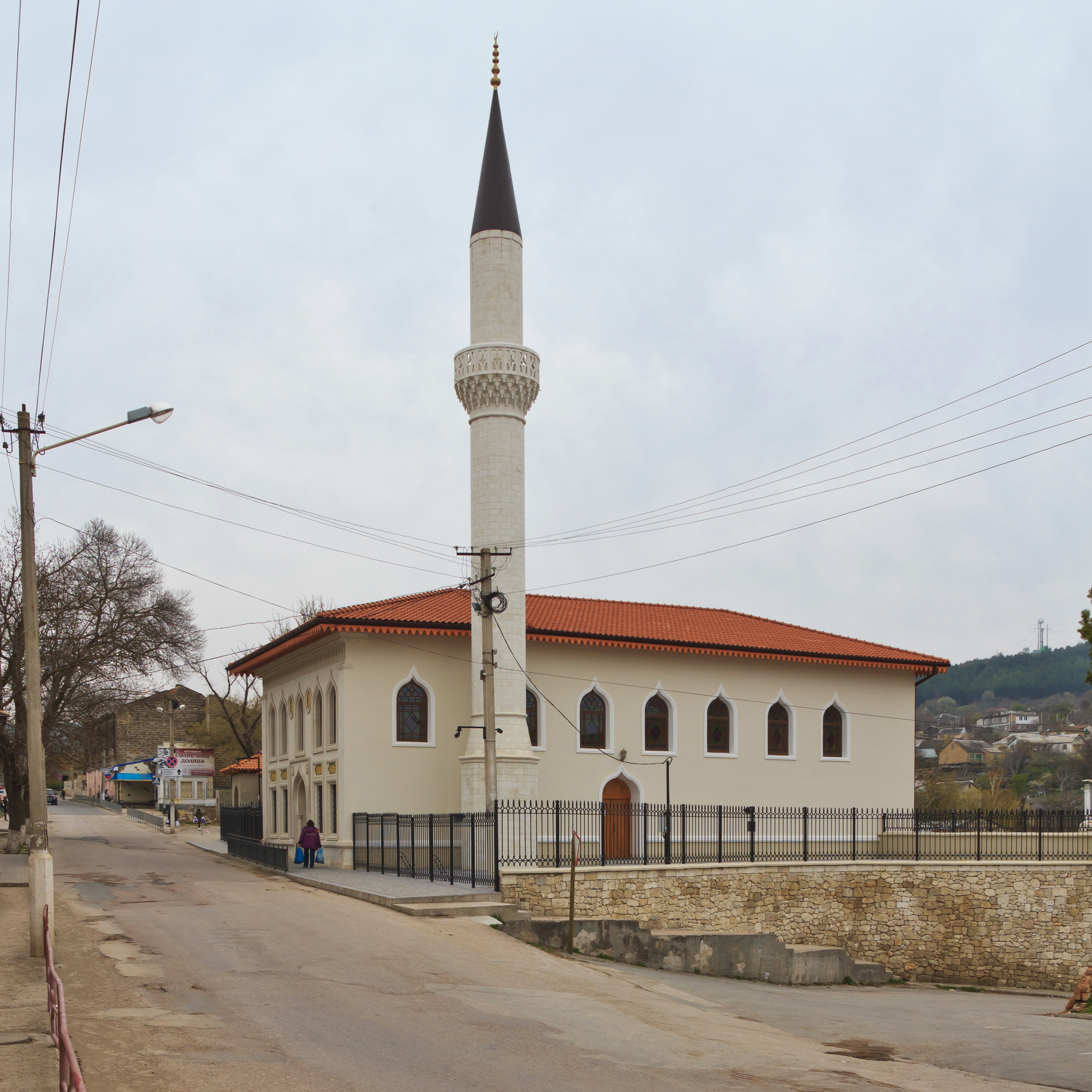

- Location within Crimea

Religion
- Affiliation: Islam
- Branch/tradition: Sunni

Location
- Location: Bakhchysarai, Crimea
- Interactive map of Orta Cami Mosque
- Coordinates: 44°44′59.35″N 33°52′37.86″E

Architecture
- Type: mosque
- Established: 1674

Specifications
- Minaret: 1
- Materials: limestone

Orta Cami Mosque (Crimean Tatar: Orta Cami; Ukrainian: Мечеть Орта-Джамі; Russian: Мечеть Орта-Джами; Turkish: Orta Camii) is one of the oldest mosques in Crimea. It is situated on the modern day Lenina Street in the old town of Bakhchysarai.

It used to be the main Friday prayer mosque in the capital of Crimean Khanate. The earliest known mention of it was in 1674, as a ma'ale mosque (main mosque of the corresponding district). The mosque was in bad condition and its minaret along with some other small surrounding buildings were completely destroyed until the end of 2012 when its reconstruction started. It is financed by Hajji Enver Umerov - Omer Kirimli family. The reconstruction also involved rebuilding of the minaret from the scratch as well as some minor buildings previously located next to the mosque. Currently, as many years ago, it is once again one of the most important places in Bakhchysarai.

== Photos ==
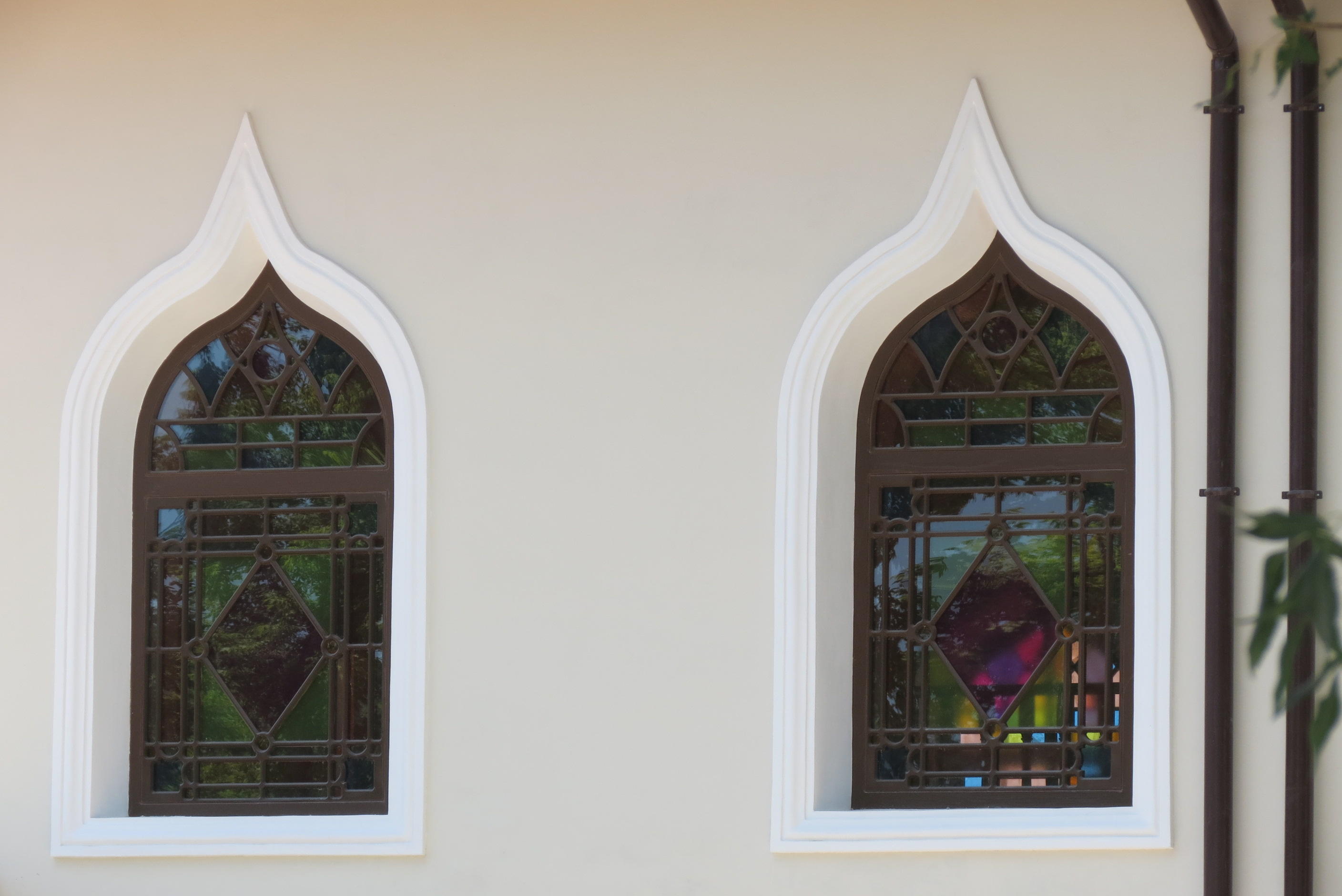
Orta Juma Jami (completed in 1674), Bakhchysarai, Crimea, Ukraine. Restored in 2013.

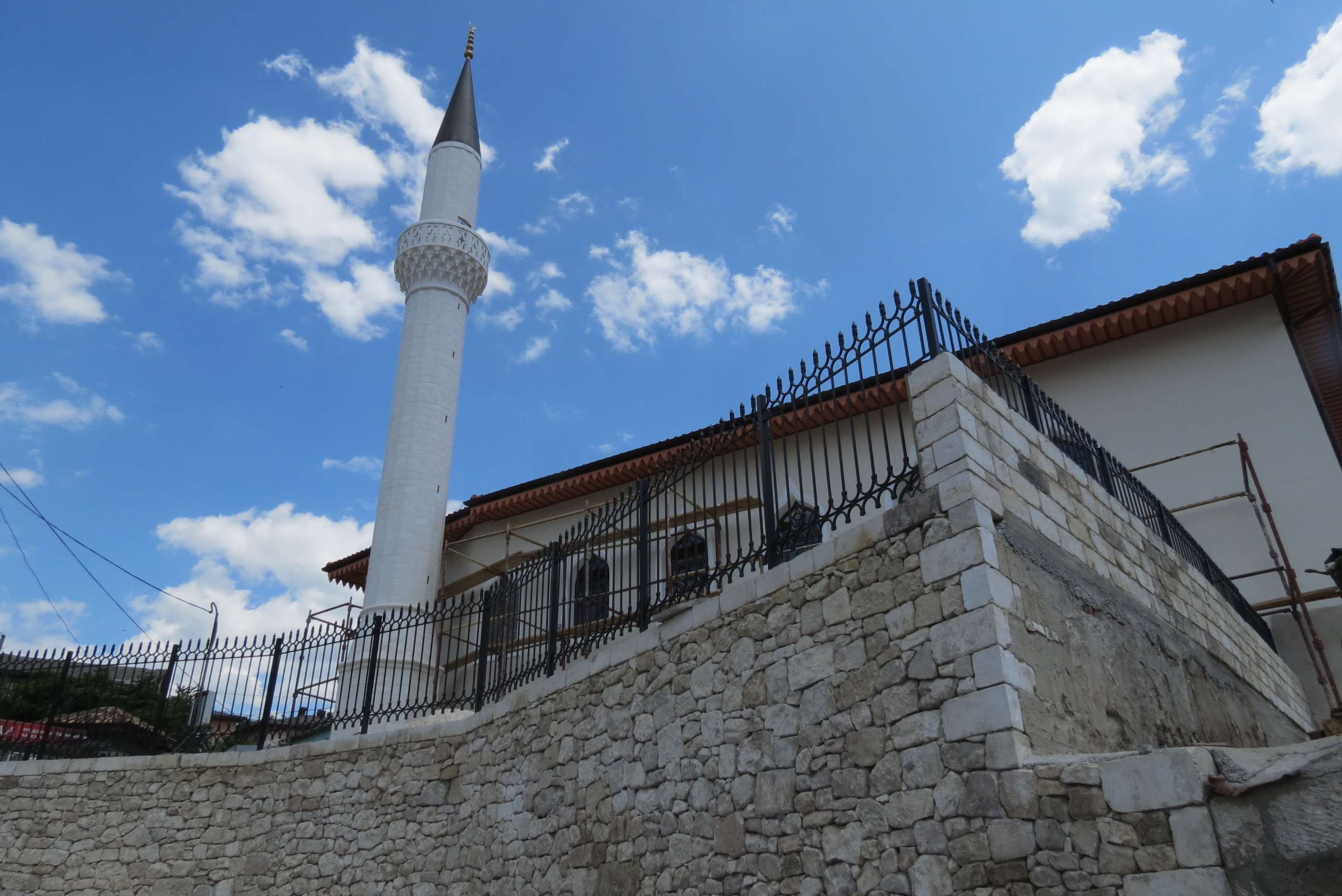
Orta Juma Jami (completed in 1674), Bakhchysarai, Crimea, Ukraine. Restored in 2013.

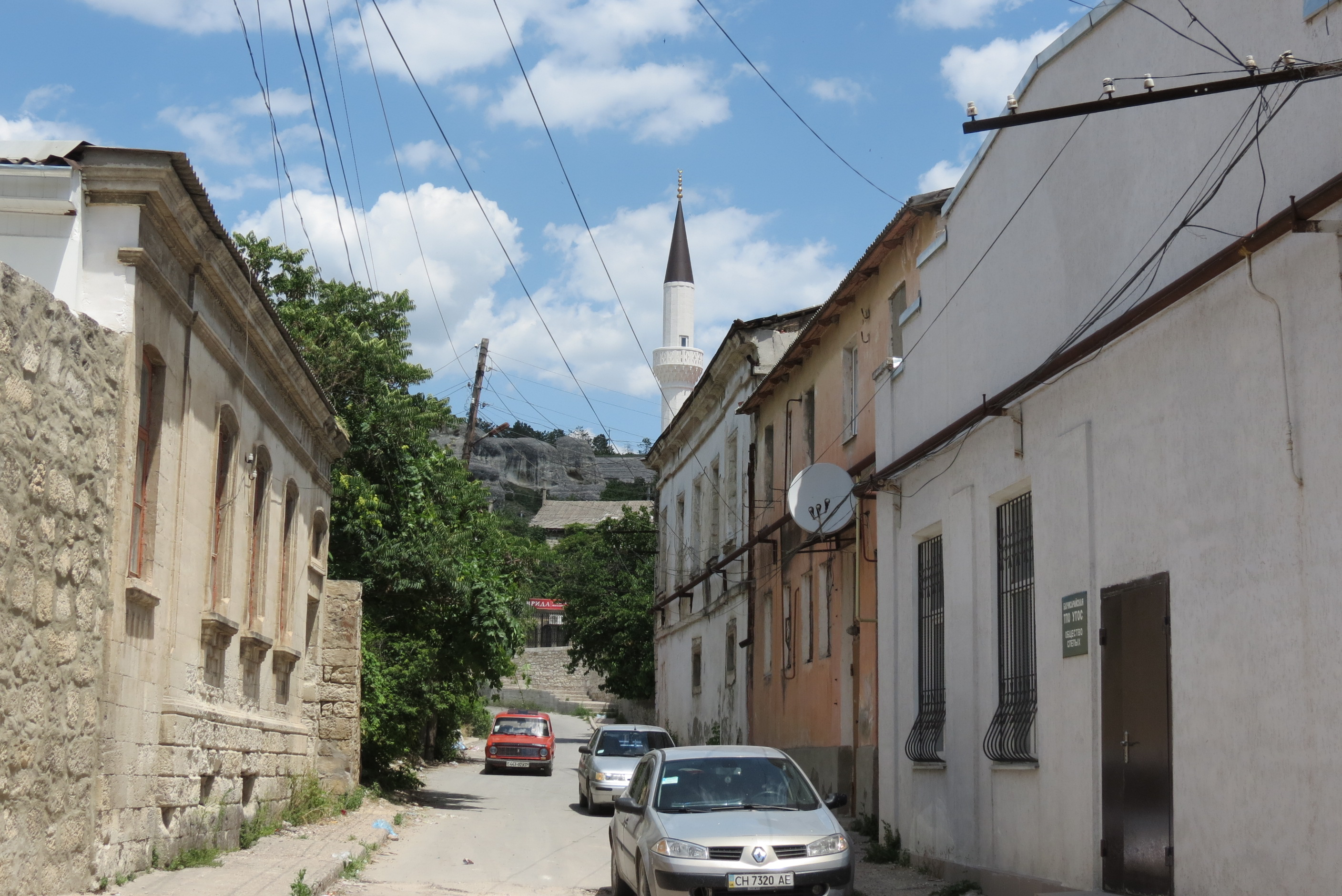
Orta Juma Jami (completed in 1674), Bakhchisaray, Crimea, Ukraine. Restored in 2013. View outside of the main Lenina street.

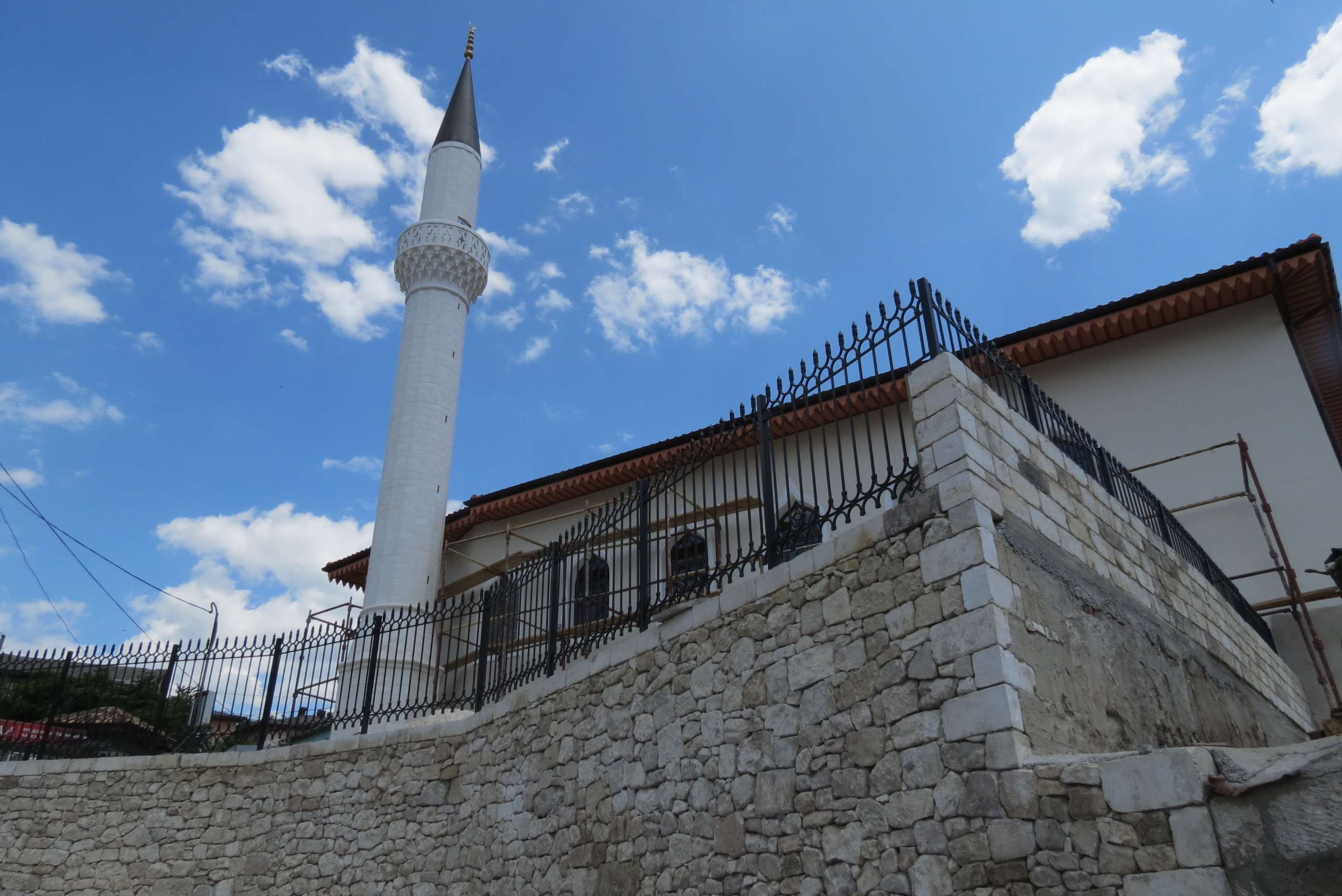
Orta Juma Jami (1674), Bakhchysarai, Crimea, Ukraine, 2013.

== See also ==
- Religion in Crimea
- List of mosques in Ukraine
- List of mosques in Russia
- List of mosques in Europe
