= Tahtali-Jami Mosque =

Sunni mosque in Bakhchisaray, Crimea

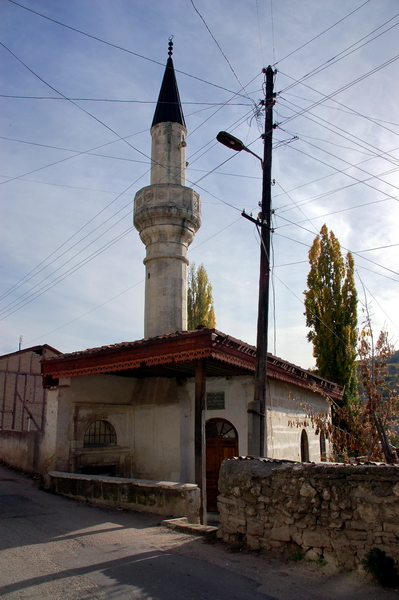

Religion
- Affiliation: Islam
- Rite: Sunni
- Status: Active

Location
- Location: 7 Rozy Lyuksemburh; Bakhchysarai
- Interactive map of Tahtali-Jami Mosque
- Territory: (Autonomous Republic of Crimea) AR Crimea (de jure) (Autonomous Republic of Crimea) Republic of Crimea (de facto)
- Coordinates: 44.74849°N 33.88662°E

Architecture
- Type: Mosque
- Style: Ottoman architecture
- Completed: 1707 or 1713-14

Specifications
- Minaret: 1
- Materials: wood, Clay tile shingles

Immovable Monument of National Significance of Ukraine
- Official name: Мечеть Тахтали Джамі (Tahtalı Cami Mosque)
- Type: Architecture
- Reference no.: 010083

The Tahtali-Jami Mosque (Crimean Tatar: Tahtalı Cami; Ukrainian: Тахтали Джамі; Russian: Тахталы-Джами; Turkish: Tahtalı Cami) is located in Bakhchysarai, Crimea. In Crimean Tatar, Tahtalı Cami means "wooden mosque."

== History ==
The mosque was built by Beyhan Sultan, a daughter of Selim I Giray, in 1707 or 1713-14. It can be seen from almost any point in the old city. It was constructed using wooden planks, later closed in stone masonry. The building was rebuilt by the local congregation in 1885 and used until it was closed in 1928. In 1989, it was restored and returned to the Muslim community.

== See also ==
- Religion in Crimea
- Islam in Ukraine
- Islam in Russia
- List of mosques in Russia
- List of mosques in Europe
