= Molla-Mustafa Jami Mosque =

Mosque in Bakhchisaray, Crimea

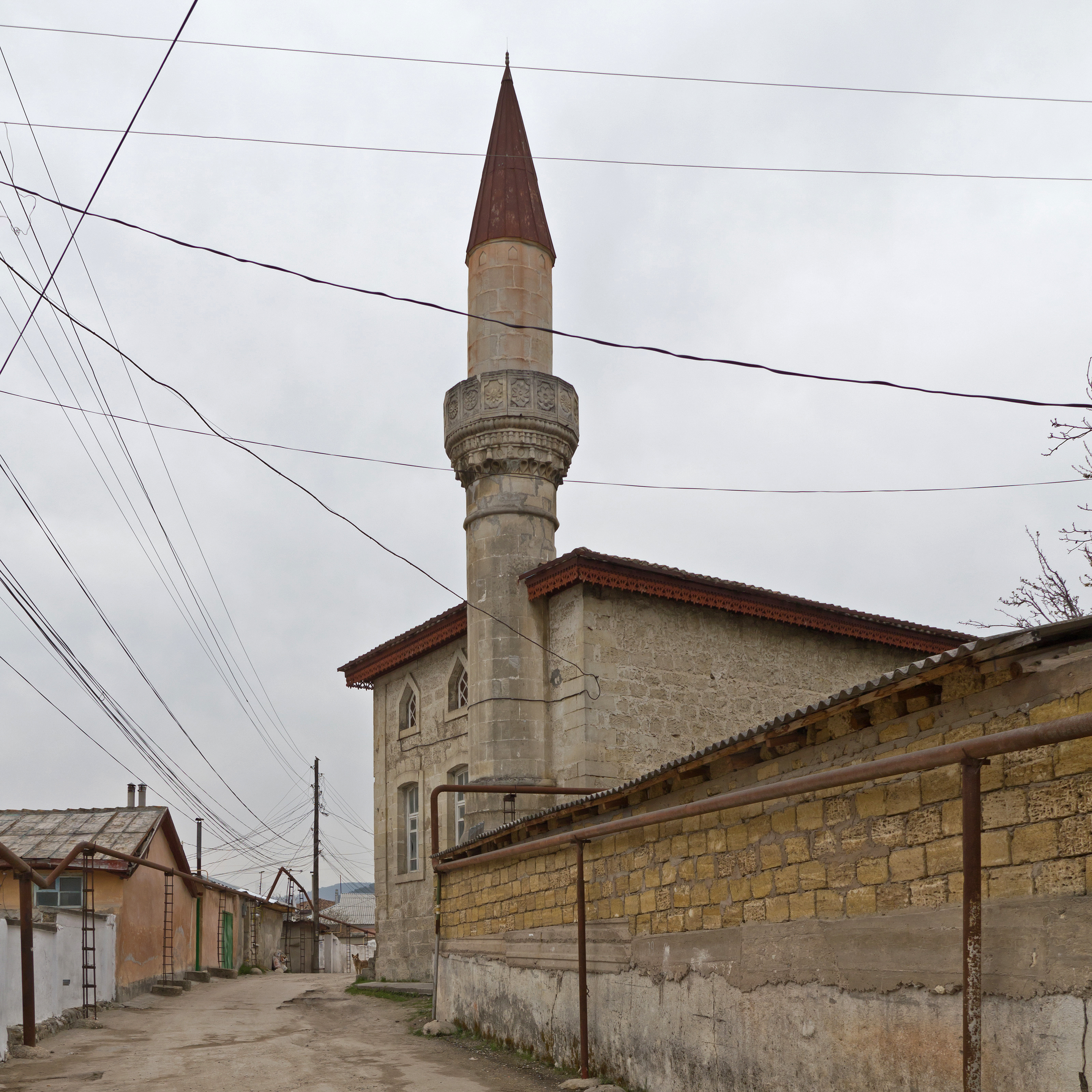

- Location within Crimea

Religion
- Affiliation: Islam

Location
- Location: Bakhchysarai, Crimea
- Interactive map of Molla-Mustafa Jami Mosque
- Coordinates: 44.75186°N 33.86541°E

Architecture
- Type: mosque
- Style: Ottoman architecture

Specifications
- Minaret: 1
- Materials: stone

Molla-Mustafa Jami Mosque is located in Bakhchysarai, Crimea, built approx. in the 18th century by a Khan of the Crimean Khanate.

The mosque is mentioned in documents of the Taurida Governorate from 1890, concerning the state of its roof in 1888. Correspondence between construction bureaus of the governorate alleges that there might have been a maktab school housed in the mosque.

The mosque is a listed local heritage object. After renovations, the mosque was reopened in January 2012.

== See also ==
- Religion in Crimea
- Islam in Russia
- List of mosques in Russia
- List of mosques in Europe
