= Geneva Mosque =

Mosque in Geneva, Switzerland

- Mosquée de Genève
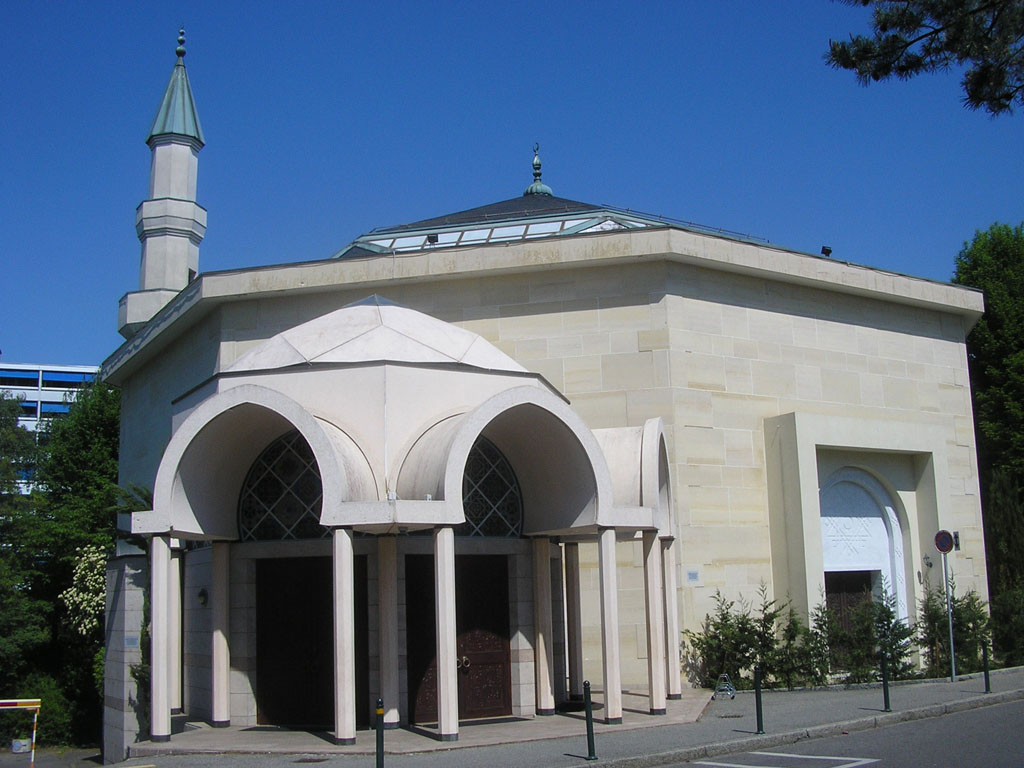

- Location within Canton of Geneva

Religion
- Affiliation: Islam
- Branch/tradition: Sunni

Location
- Location: Geneva, Switzerland
- Interactive map of Geneva Mosque
- Coordinates: 46°13′25″N 6°7′19″E

Architecture
- Type: mosque
- Completed: 1978

Specifications
- Minaret: 1
- Minaret height: 22 m

The Geneva Mosque, also known as the Petit-Saconnex Mosque (French: Mosquée de Genève, Mosquée de Petit-Sacconex) is the largest mosque in Geneva, Switzerland. It was financed by the Saudi-based Muslim World League and constructed in 1978 in the neighborhood of Le Petit-Saconnex.

The mosque was inaugurated by the Saudi Arabian King Khalid ibn Abd al-Aziz and President of the Swiss Confederation Willi Ritschard, and is the largest mosque in the city and Switzerland as a whole. The building has space for 1,500 worshippers. It is managed by the Islamic Cultural Foundation of Geneva and the imam of the mosque is Yahya Basalamah. In November 2017, the secretary general of the Muslim World League Muhammad bin Abdul Karim Issa said that he will constitute a new board of the Islamic Cultural Foundation of Geneva and that two mosque employees, who have been placed by French officials on an anti-terrorism backlist known as “Fiche S” since at least 2012, will be removed from their posts. He said he had ambitions for the Geneva mosque to become a model of dialogue and integration otherwise the MWL would consider withdrawing all support to the mosque.

== See also ==
- Islam in Switzerland
- List of mosques in Europe
- Swiss minaret referendum, 2009
