= Telfs Mosque =

Mosque in Telfs, Tyrol, Austria

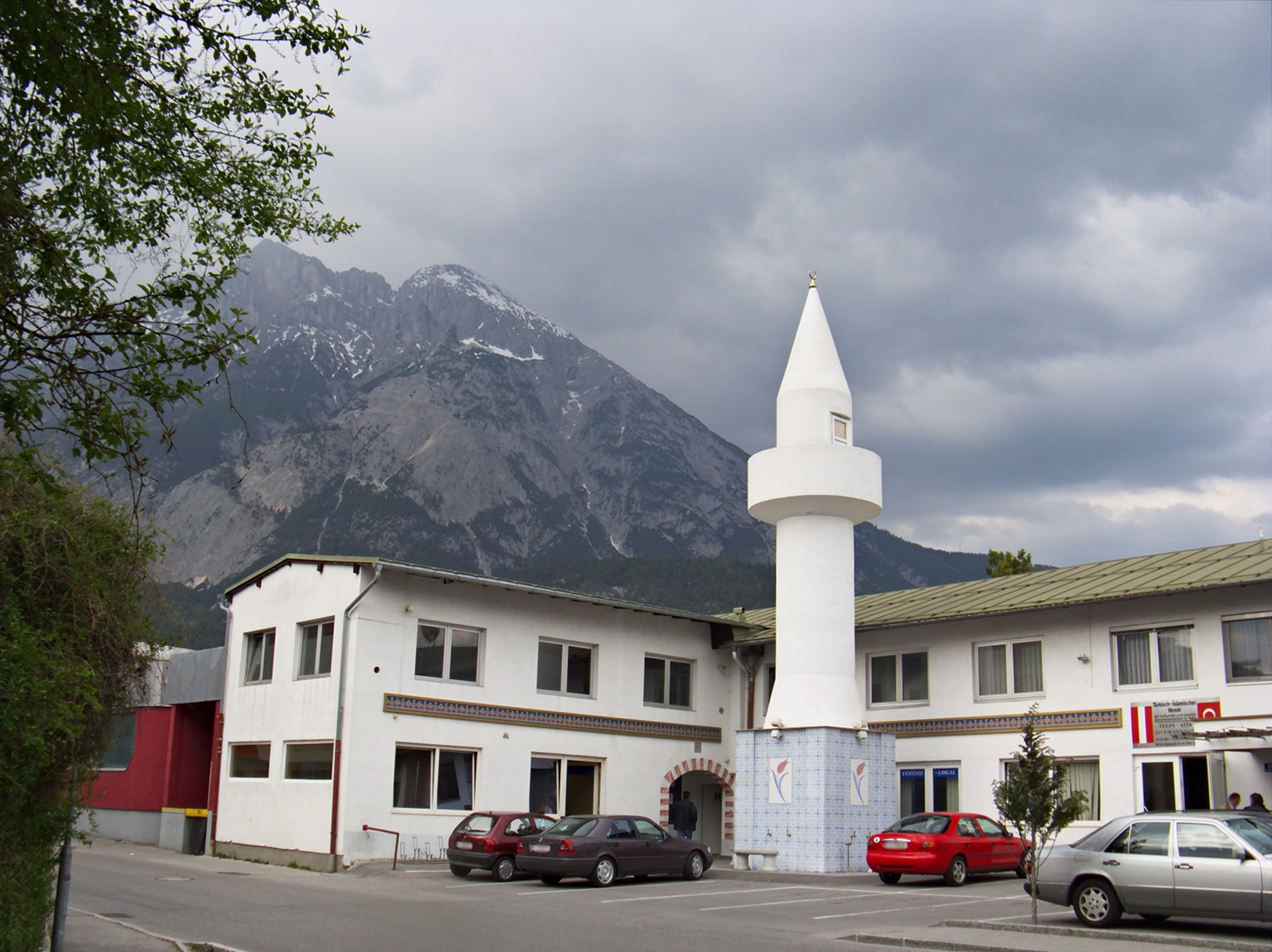
- The mosque in 2010

- Location of the mosque in Austria

Religion
- Affiliation: Islam
- Ecclesiastical or organizational status: Mosque
- Status: Active

Location
- Location: Telfs, Tyrol
- Country: Austria
- Interactive map of Telfs Mosque
- Coordinates: 47°18′22″N 11°4′47″E

Architecture
- Completed: 1998
- Minaret: 1

The Telfs Mosque, officially the Eyüp-Sultan-Mosque, is a mosque in the town of Telfs, in the state of Tyrol, Austria.

== Overview ==
Established in 1998 in response to the growing Muslim community in the Tyrolean region, construction of the mosque was funded by donations from the local Muslim community and support from international Islamic organizations.

In 2007, it was reported the mosque was vandalized and swastika symbols were left on its single minaret.

== See also ==
- Islam in Austria
- List of mosques in Austria
