= Luhansk Regional Committee of the Communist Party of Ukraine =

Former administrative group of the Luhansk Oblast, Ukrainian SSR

The Luhansk Regional Committee of the Communist Party of Ukraine, commonly referred to as the Luhansk CPU obkom, was the position of highest authority in the Luhansk Oblast (until March 5, 1958, and again from January 5, 1970, until May 4, 1990, as the Voroshylovhrad Oblast), in the Ukrainian SSR of the Soviet Union. The position was created in June 1938, and abolished in August 1991. The First Secretary was a de facto appointed position usually by the Central Committee of the Communist Party of Ukraine or the First Secretary of the Communist Party of Ukraine.

== List of First Secretaries of the Communist Party of Luhansk ==
Name	Term of Office		Life years
Name	Start	End	Life years
First Secretaries of the Oblast Committee of the Communist Party
Petro Lyubavin	June 1938	November 1938	1898–1941
Mykhailo Kvasov	November 13, 1938	December 21, 1940	
Anton Hayovy	December 21, 1940	1942	1907–1962
Nazi German occupation (1942–1943)
Anton Hayovy	1943	1951	1907–1962
Vasyl Klymenko	1951	March 1961	1906–1984
Volodymyr Shevchenko (Note: For Industry January 1963 – December 1964)	March 1961	December 14, 1973	1918–1997
Mykola Hureyev (Note: For Agriculture)	January 1963	December 1964	1907–1978
Borys Honcharenko	December 14, 1973	February 27, 1987	1927–1999
Ivan Lyakhov	February 27, 1987	February 1990	1936–
Anatoliy Onyshchenko	May 26, 1990	August 1991	1937–

== See also ==
- Luhansk Oblast

== Sources ==
- World Statesmen.org
