= Bâra =

- Commune
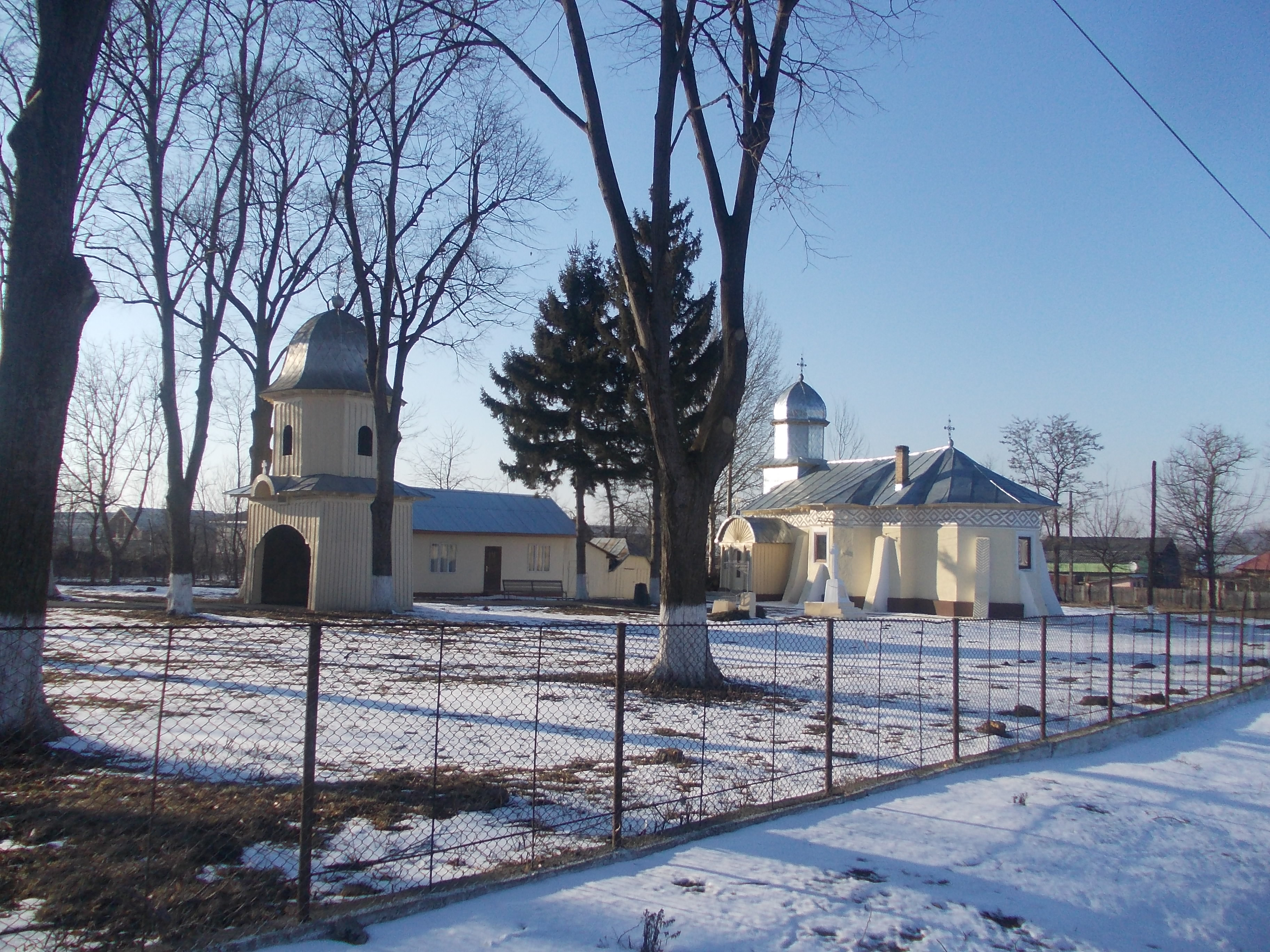
- Church in Rediu village

- Location in Neamț County

- Location in Romania
- Coordinates: 47.025°N 27.044°E
- Country: Romania
- County: Neamț

Government
  - Mayor (2024–2028): Vasile Vlăduț Roșu (PNL)
- Area: 23.12 km^{2} (8.93 sq mi)
- Elevation: 268 m (879 ft)
- Population (2021-12-01): 1,532
  - Density: 66.26/km^{2} (171.6/sq mi)
- Time zone: UTC+02:00 (EET)
  - Summer (DST): UTC+03:00 (EEST)
- Postal code: 617030
- Area code: +(40) 233
- Vehicle reg.: NT
- Website: bira.ro

Bâra is a commune in Neamț County, Western Moldavia, Romania. It is composed of three villages: Bâra, Negrești, and Rediu.

In Rediu, in the summer of 2014, the Maryam Mosque for Romanian converts to Islam was established.

Historical population
Year	Pop.	±%
1992	1,899	—
2002	1,894	−0.3%
2011	1,680	−11.3%
2021	1,532	−8.8%
Source: Census data
