= Kharkiv Cathedral Mosque =

Mosque in Kharkiv, Ukraine

Coordinates: 49°59′07″N 36°13′13″E

Religion
- Affiliation: Islam
- District: Kharkiv Oblast
- Status: Active

Location
- Location: Kharkiv
- Interactive map of Kharkiv Cathedral Mosque
- Territory: Ukraine

Architecture
- Type: Mosque
- Completed: 1905

Specifications
- Dome: 1
- Minaret: 1

The Kharkiv Cathedral Mosque, also known as Khavidrali Mosque, (Ukrainian: Харківська соборна мечеть, romanized: Kharkivska soborna mechet) is located in Kharkiv, Ukraine. The mosque was originally built in 1906, demolished by Soviet communists in 1936, and rebuilt in 2006.

== History ==
In 1906, a mosque was built on the bank of the Lopan River. It became necessary to build a mosque due to the increase in Muslim population in Kharkiv, who were the descendents of Tatar Cavalry Regiment and Bashkir who were deployed in the area during the Russo-Turkish War in 1877 and chose to remain there. Kharkhiv was the capital at this point, and remained so until 1934.

The mosque was destroyed by the Soviets in 1936 on claims that it hindered the flow of the river, and instead built residential housing in the area. Work to campaign for it to be rebuilt started with the founding of the Charter of the Muslim Community in Kharkiv in 1991. In 1999 work began to rebuild the mosque at the same location, which was completed in 2006, the centenary of the construction of the original mosque. The architectural design of the original mosque was preserved when it was rebuilt, as an homage. The mosque is located on Yaroslavska Street. Kharkhiv is also home to an Islamic Cultural Centre, organising various activities, including English lessons, Arabic lessons and Qur'an reading groups.

Parishioners consist primarily of Tatars, Crimean Tatars, and Turks.

The mosque is able to accommodate 500 people for prayers.

== See also ==
- Islam in Ukraine
