= Maryam Mosque =

Mosque in Rediu, Romania, for Romanian converts to Islam

- Moscheea Maria
- Location of the Maryam Mosque in Romania

Religion
- Affiliation: Islam
- Leadership: Daniel Cîniparu

Location
- Location: Rediu, Bâra commune, Neamț County, Romania
- Interactive map of Maryam Mosque
- Coordinates: 47°0′32.251″N 26°59′46.514″E

Architecture
- Type: Mosque
- Founder: Daniel Cîniparu
- Funded by: Foreigners, Muslims by birth, Romanian converts to Islam

The Maryam Mosque, also known as the Maria Mosque (Romanian: Moscheea Maria), is a mosque located in Rediu, in the Bâra commune (Neamț County) in Romania, for Romanian converts to Islam. It was inaugurated in the summer of 2014 by Daniel Cîniparu, a Transylvanian from Turda who moved to Rediu as the lands there were cheaper. He built there one house for his family and one building for practicing Islam, the Maryam Mosque.

The Maryam Mosque was built through funds donated by foreigners, Muslims from birth and converted Romanians. At its foundation attended the local authorities of Bâra and several Muslims throughout Romania. Cîniparu claimed that, at the time of the foundation of the mosque, there were about 12 Muslims within a 30 kilometres (19 miles) radius around Rediu, although his family was the only Muslim one in the village. Daniel Cîniparu's wife, Maria Cîniparu, had willingly converted to Islam as well, and both had three children, all of them baptized Orthodox Christians. The mosque does not adhere to any specific branch of Islam. Cîniparu has said that he has received insults for his decision and that he admires Dobruja for the peaceful coexistence of religions there. As of 2015, the Maryam Mosque served 8 people.

As of 2017, between 18 and 20 people had converted in the mosque, mostly Romanians but also some foreigners, who were originally Orthodox or Greek Catholic.

== See also ==
- Islam in Romania
