= Ivan Lyakhov (politician) =

Ukrainian politician

- Іван Ляхов
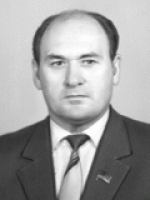

Member of the Verkhovna Rada
- In office 15 May 1990 – 10 May 1994

Personal details
- Born: Ivan Andriyovych Lyakhov; 6 April 1936 Kadiivka, Ukraine, Soviet Union
- Died: 2006 Luhansk, Ukraine

Ivan Andriyovych Lyakhov (Ukrainian: Іван Андрійович Ляхов; 6 April 1936 - 2006), was a Ukrainian politician who had served as a Member of the Verkhovna Rada from 1990 to 1994.

He had been a member of Supreme Soviet of the USSR of the 11th convocation from 1984 to 1989 from the Ivano-Frankivsk region.

== Biography ==
Ivan Lyakhov was born in Kadiivka, Luhansk Oblast on 6 April 1936, to family of workers of Russian ethnicity. In 1958, he graduated from the Dnepropetrovsk Mining Institute.

In the same year, Lyakhov worked as a foreman in the coal industry, where he was a master of technical control, head of the technical control department of mine No. 22 of the "Kirovvugilya" trust in the Luhansk Oblast.

From 1959 to 1962, he was the head of the coal beneficiation department of the "Kirovvugil" trust of the Luhansk region.

He entered politics as he joined the Communist Party of the Soviet Union in 1962. That same year, he was the 1st secretary of the Kirov zonal industrial production committee of the Luhansk Region LKSMU.

From 1963 to December 1964, he was the 2nd secretary of the Luhansk Industrial Regional Committee of the LKSMU.

From 1965 to 1969, he was the 1st secretary of the Luhansk Regional Committee of the LKSU.

In 1969, he was the first secretary of the Krasnodon city committee of the Communist Party of Ukraine, then became an inspector of the Central Committee of the Communist Party of Ukraine.

From November 1973 to October 1979, he was the first secretary of the Voroshilovgrad city committee of the Communist Party of Voroshilovgrad region.

From October 1979 to 1981, he was a student of the main branch of the Academy of Social Sciences under the Central Committee of the CPSU.

In 1981, after graduating from the academy, he became the secretary, then first secretary of the Ivano-Frankivsk regional committee of the Communist Party of Ukraine. In 1985, he was appointed head of the department of organizational, party and personnel work of the Central Committee of the Communist Party of Ukraine.

In July 1981, he was the secretary of the Ivano-Frankivsk Regional Committee of the Communist Party of Ukraine. In June 1983, he was demoted to the 2nd secretary of the Ivano-Frankivsk Regional Committee of the Communist Party of Ukraine.

In December 1983, he was promoted to the first secretary of the Ivano-Frankivsk Regional Committee of the Communist Party of Ukraine.

In 1984, Lyakhov was elected a member Supreme Soviet of the USSR.

From December 1985 to February 1987, he was the head of the department of organizational and party work of the Central Committee of the Communist Party of Ukraine.

From February 1987 to February 1990, he was the first secretary of the Voroshilovgrad regional committee of the Communist Party of Ukraine.

In February 1990, he was an inspector of the Central Committee of the Communist Party of Ukraine.

On 4 March 1990, Lyakov was elected as a member of parliament, a people's deputy of Ukraine of the Verkhovna Rada, gaining 62.01% of the votes and 2 applicants in the first round of elections. He was sworn in to office on 5 May. He was a member of the group “For Soviet Sovereign Ukraine.” Member of the Verkhovna Rada Commission on Social Policy and Labor.

Among the results of Lyakhov's activities as head of the Luhansk region, one can highlight the construction of the Western filtration station and new water pipelines, strengthening the housing construction base through the construction of new DSK.

In August 1991, he was the deputy head of the Luhansk Oblast Department of the Ministry of Internal Affairs of Ukraine.

In 1997, he had been the chairman of the board of the Luhansk Regional Socio-Community Charitable Foundation for Adaptation (social rehabilitation of persons released from prison).

He died in Luhansk in 2006.

In 2015, he was included in the list of persons of influences of people of communists during the decommunization laws.

== Family ==
He was married and has children.
