= Luhansk Cathedral Mosque =

Mosque in Luhansk, Ukraine

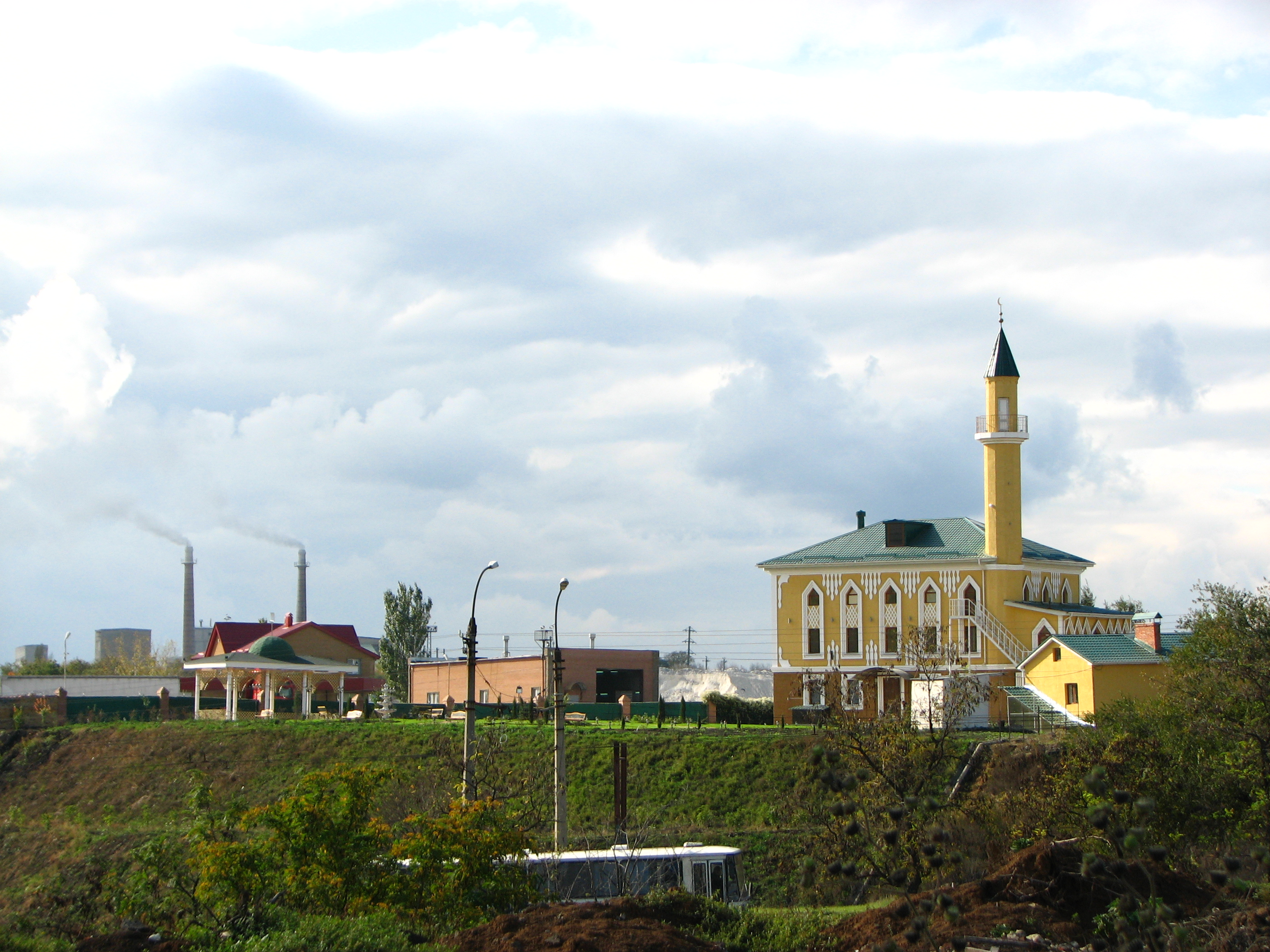
- The mosque is the yellow building on the right.

Religion
- Affiliation: Islam
- Status: Active

Location
- Location: Luhansk
- Interactive map of Luhansk Cathedral Mosque
- Territory: Ukraine (de jure); Luhansk People's Republic (de facto)
- Coordinates: 48°04′34″N 39°31′18″E

Architecture
- Type: Mosque
- Completed: 2010

Specifications
- Capacity: 500
- Minaret: 1
- Minaret height: 25 meters

The Luhansk Cathedral Mosque (Ukrainian: Луганська соборна мечеть) is a mosque in Luhansk, Ukraine.

== History ==
Tatars, among other ethnic groups, are native to the multinational region of Central Eurasia, especially its steppes – modern territories of Russian Federation, Ukraine, and Kazakhstan. During the second half of 19th century Volga Tatars from central Russia, as citizens of Russian empire, in great number moved to the Donbas area of southern Ukraine to work at mines and factories. The number of Volga Tatars at the Luhansk region grew up to about 400,000. Tatars had their own mosques and schools. During Soviet era, authorities closed almost all of them.

Great changes in social life of Central Eurasia and Eastern Europe in the 1980s and 1990s as a result of the dissolution of the Soviet Union and the independence of Ukraine led also to revival of religious, cultural and social life of different communities, among them the Crimean Tatars.

The Luhansk Cathedral Mosque was built by the Muslim community of the Luhansk region. It was officially opened on 29 May 2010.

The mosque building is a two-storied construction with an area of 550 square meters. On the basement floor there is a sports hall and a kitchen. On the ground floor there is a library, classroom, and office. In 2014, the building was damaged by explosives during the Russian invasion of Ukraine but still held a celebration for Eid al-Adha.

== See also ==
- Islam in Ukraine
