= Religion in Crimea =

Religion in Crimea (2013)
1. Eastern Orthodox (58.0%)
2. Muslim (15.0%)
3. Belief without religion (10.0%)
4. Atheist (2.00%)
5. Other religion (2.00%)
6. Not stated (3.00%)
7. Don't know/No answer (10.0%)

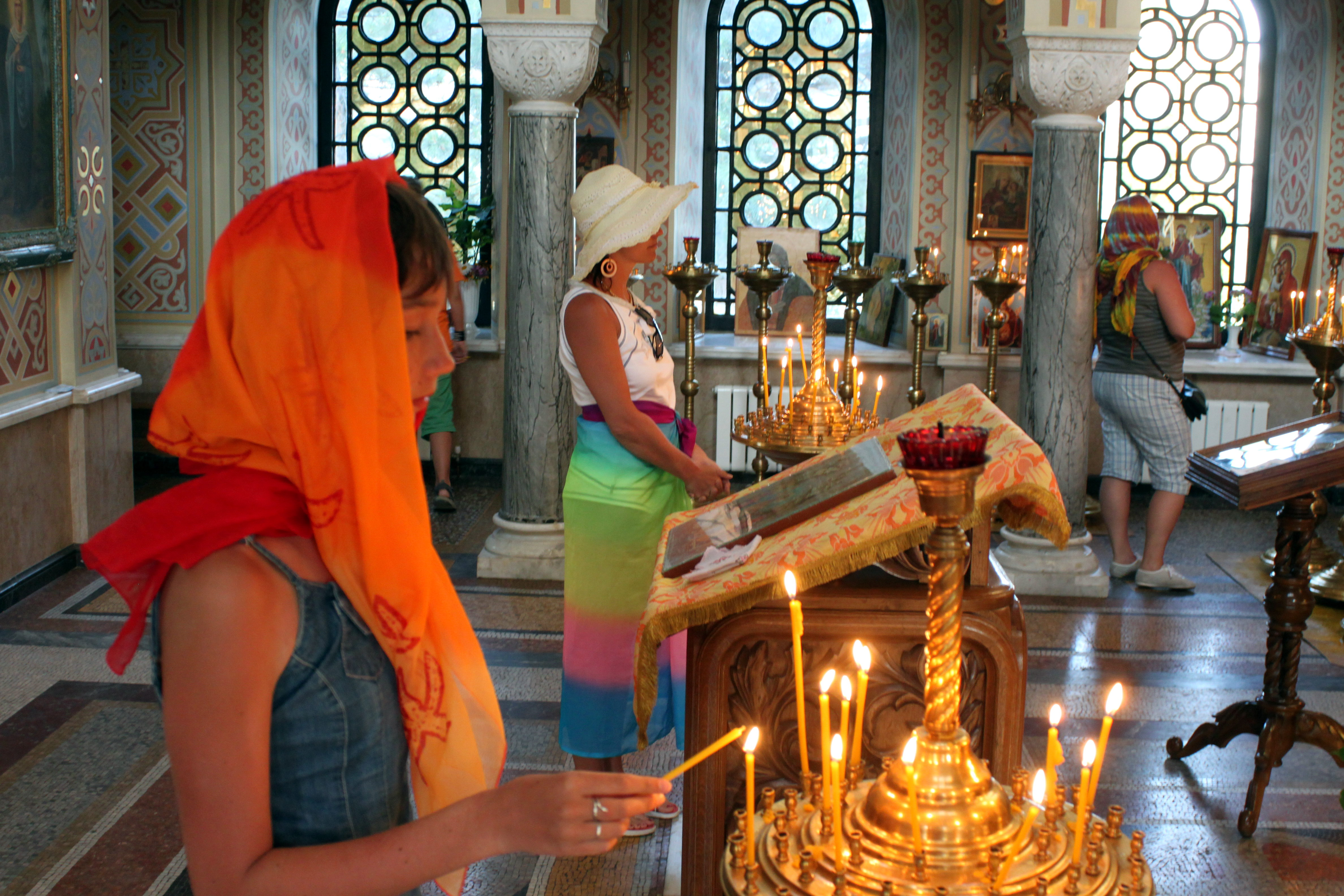
Interior of the Church of the Resurrection of Christ, near Yalta.

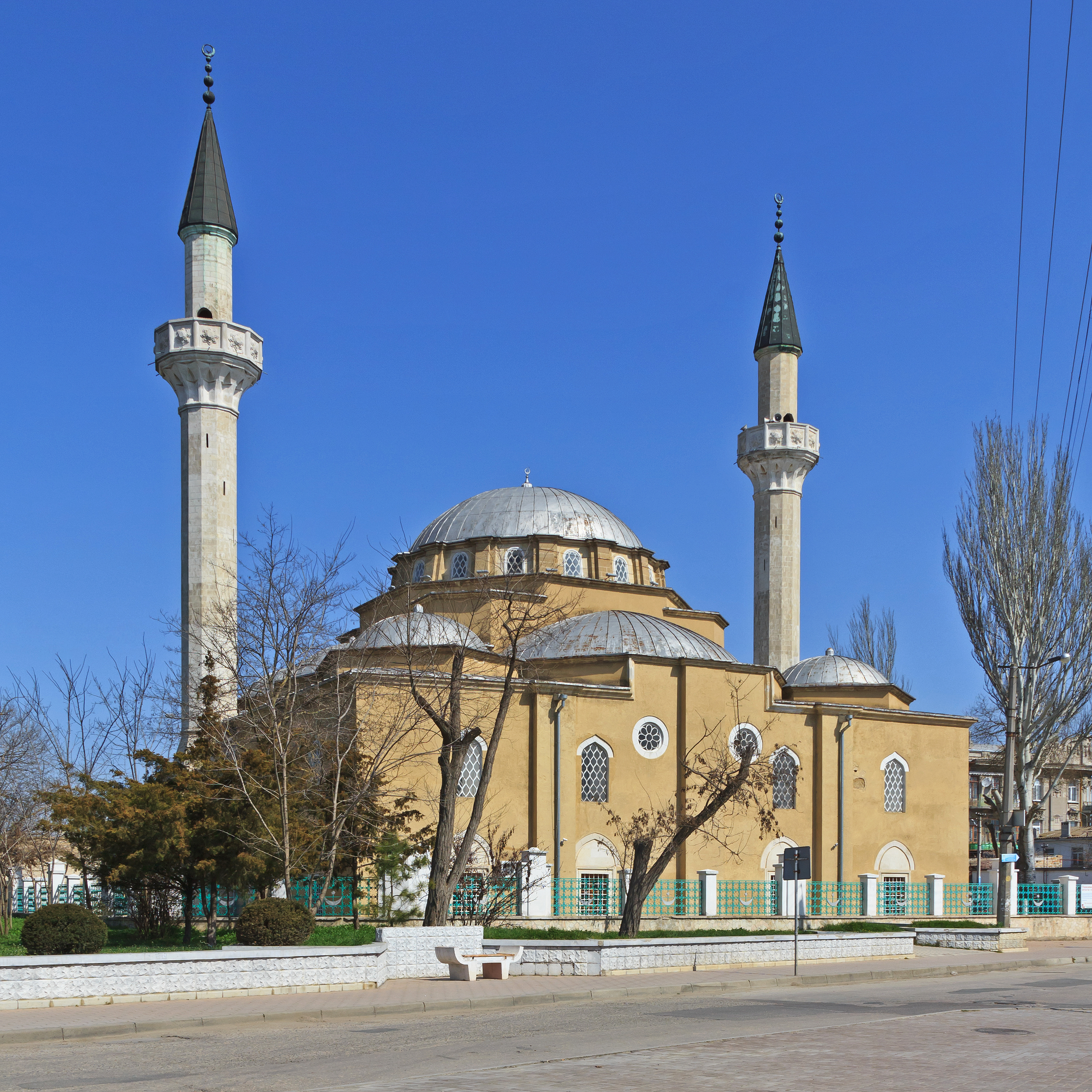
Juma-Jami Mosque, Yevpatoria

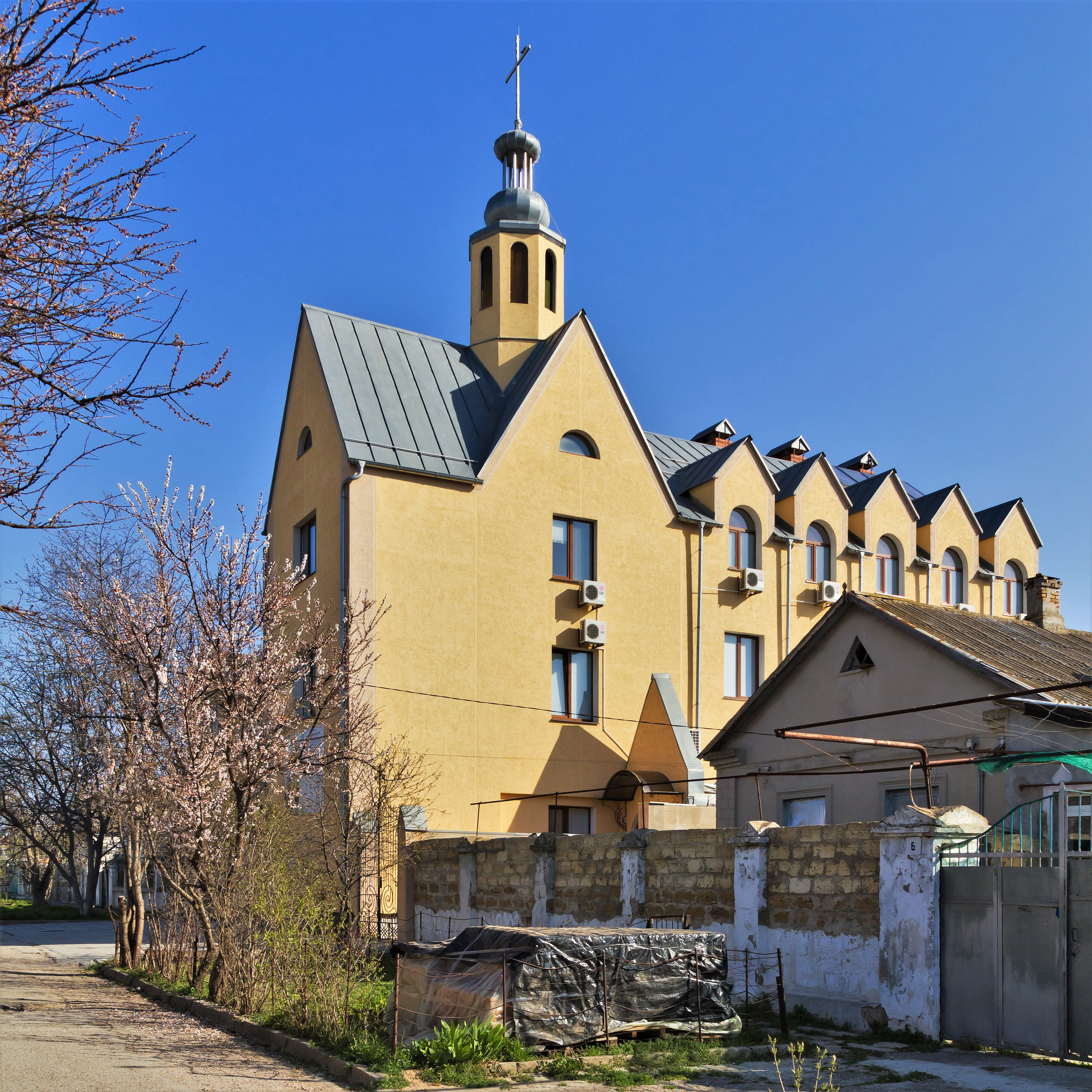
Roman Catholic church in Yevpatoria

The majority of the Crimean population adheres to the Russian Orthodox Church, with the Crimean Tatars forming a Sunni Muslim minority, besides smaller Roman Catholic, Ukrainian Greek Catholic, Armenian Apostolic and Jewish minorities.

The Crimean peninsula was Christianised at an early time, via Gothic Christianity, in the 4th century. According to a 9th-century tradition, Pope Clement I (ruled 88–98) was exiled to Chersonesos (near what is now Sevastopol) in 102, as was Pope Martin I in 655. A representative from the Black Sea area, the "head of the Scythian bishopric", was present at the First Council of Nicaea in 325, as well as the First Council of Constantinople in 381; it has been surmised that this representative would have to have been Bishop Cadmus of the Bosporan Kingdom. Ostrogoths, who remained on present-day Ukrainian lands after the invasion of the Huns, established a metropolinate under the Bishop of Constantinople at Dorus in northern Crimea around the year 400. The Goths initially adhered to Arianism, but by the 9th century, with the establishment of the Byzantine Cherson theme, the Goths in Crimea turned to the Greek Orthodox Church, under the Metropolitanate of Gothia. A bishop's seat had also existed since 868 across the Strait of Kerch, in the city of Tmutarakan. In the mid-10th century, the eastern area of Crimea was conquered by Prince Sviatoslav I of Kiev and became part of the Kievan Rus' principality of Tmutarakan. In 988, Prince Vladimir I of Kiev also captured Chersonesos where he later converted to Christianity.

Meanwhile, the Khazars, who occupied the northern parts of the peninsula, converted to Judaism. Both the date of the conversion, and the extent of its influence beyond the elite, are disputed; the conversion must have taken place at some point between 740 and 920.

Catholicism has had a small presence in Crimea via Italian and Anglo-Saxon colonies.

Islam in Crimea began with the presence of Islamized Turco-Mongol populations following the Mongol invasion of Rus' in the 1230s. Islam became the state religion of the Golden Horde in 1313 with the conversion of Öz Beg Khan (Crimea's first mosque was built in Qırım in 1314).

Crimean Tatars are the indigenous population of Crimea. They are Sunni Muslims of the Hanafi school. During the Crimean Khanate, Islam was the state religion.

With the annexation by Russia in 1779, Crimea was again Christianised, this time under the Russian Orthodox Church.

Most Crimean Tatars remained Muslim. There were 470 Muslim communities registered in Crimea in 1921. But the entire nation was deported in May 1944, and not allowed to return until 1989. During the intervening 45 years not a single Muslim community remained in Crimea.

In 2013 Orthodox Christians made up 58% of the Crimean population, followed by Muslims (15%) and Believers in God without religion (10%).

Since the Russian annexation of the peninsula in 2014, the United Nations human rights agency, the OHCHR, has catalogued human rights violations by the occupation authorities, including against freedom of thought, conscience, and religion of people in Crimea and Sevastopol.

== See also ==
- Demographics of Crimea
- Religion in Russia
- Religion in Ukraine
- Christianity in Russia
- Christianity in Ukraine
- Islam in Russia
