= Demographics of France =

- Population pyramid, 2021
- Population: ▲69,081,996 (1 January 2026)
- Density: ▲124.3/km^{2} (322/sq mi) (2022)
- Growth rate: ▼0.30% (2023)
- Birth rate: ▼9.7 births/1,000 population (2023)
- Death rate: ▼9.5 deaths/1,000 population (2023)
- Life expectancy: ▲83.1 years (2025)
  - male: ▲80.3 years
  - female: ▲85.9 years
- Fertility rate: ▼1.56 (2025)
- Infant mortality: ▼3.6 deaths/1,000 live births (2020)
- Net migration rate: ▲1.1 migrant(s)/1,000 population (2024 est.)
- Immigrant share: 13.8% (2024)

Age structure
- 0–14 years: ▼16.96% (2024)
- 15–64 years: ▲60.87% (2024)
- 65 and over: ▲22.17% (2024)

Nationality
- Nationality: French (85%)

Language
- Official: French (official)
- Spoken: Languages of France

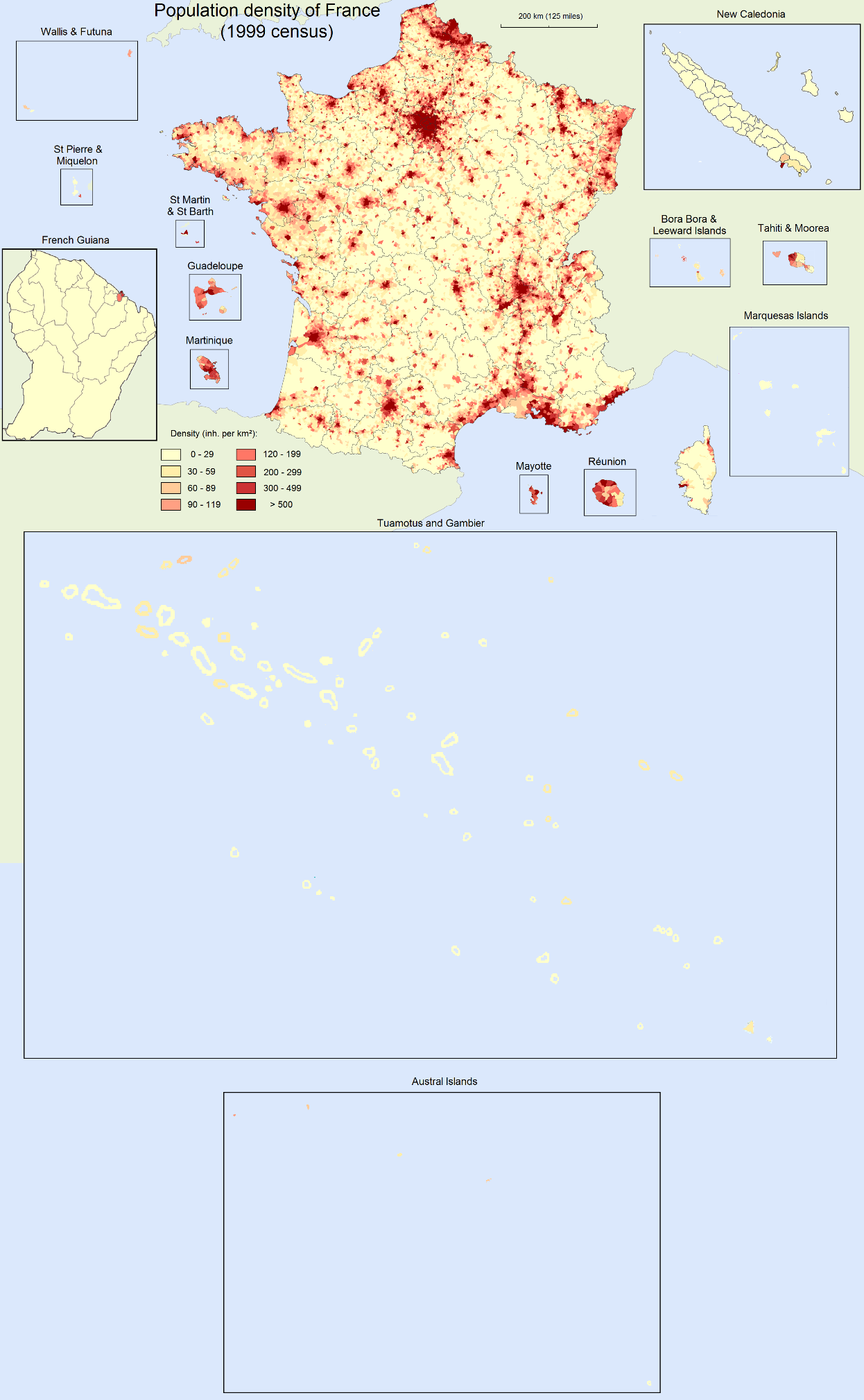
Population density 1999, all territories are shown at the same geographic scale

Animated population pyramid of Metropolitan France 1901–2020. Those born during the world wars and Spanish flu are marked in dark.

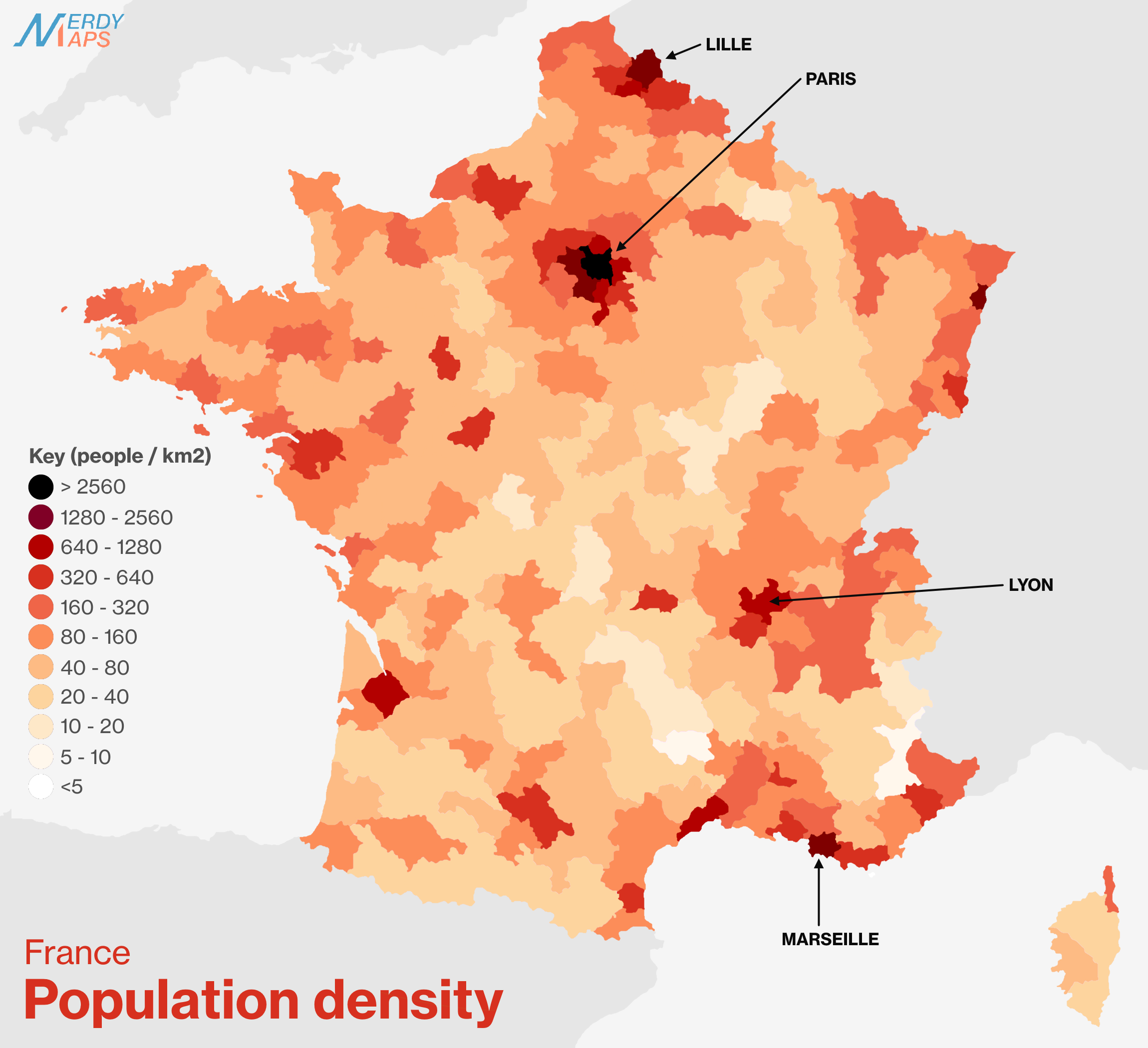
Population density in France by arrondissement in 2018

The demography of France is monitored by the Institut national d'études démographiques (INED) and the Institut national de la statistique et des études économiques (INSEE). As of 1 January 2026, in Metropolitan France 66,792,845 people lived, while 2,289,151 lived in overseas France, (Note: DOM: French Guiana; Guadeloupe; Martinique; Mayotte; Réunion) for a total of 69,081,996 inhabitants in the French Republic. In the 2010s and until 2017, the population of France grew by 1 million people every three years – an average annual increase of 340,000 people, or +0.6%.

France was historically Europe's most populous country. During the Middle Ages, more than one-quarter of Europe's total population was French; by the seventeenth century, this had decreased slightly to one-fifth. By the beginning of the nineteenth century, other European countries, such as Germany and Russia, had caught up with France and overtaken it in number of people. The country's population sharply increased with the baby boom following World War II, as it did in other European countries.

According to INSEE, from the year 2004, 200,000 immigrants entered the country annually. One out of two was born in Europe and one in three in Africa. Between 2009 and 2012, the number of Europeans migrating to France increased sharply (an annual increase of 12%), but this percentage decreased steadily until 2022, supplanted by a rise in the number of immigrants from Africa.

The national birth rate, after dropping for a time, began to rebound in the 1990s, and the country's fertility rate was close to the replacement level until about 2014. According to a 2006 INSEE study, the natural increase was close to 300,000 people a year, a level that had "not been reached in more than thirty years." With a total fertility rate of 1.59 (for France métropolitaine) in 2024, France remains one of the above-average fertile countries in the European Union, but it is now far from the replacement level.

In 2021, the total fertility rate of France was 1.82 children per woman, and 7.7% of all births were a women's 4th or more child.

Among the 802,000 babies born in metropolitan France in 2010, 80.1% had two French parents, 13.3% had one French parent, and 6.6% had two non-French parents.

Between 2006 and 2008, about 22% of newborns in France had at least one foreign-born grandparent (9% born in another European country, 8% born in the Maghreb and 2% born in another region of the world). Censuses on race and ethnic origin were banned by the French government in 1978.

== Historical overview ==
=== 1800 to 20th century ===
Population pyramid before and after the First World War

1914

1920

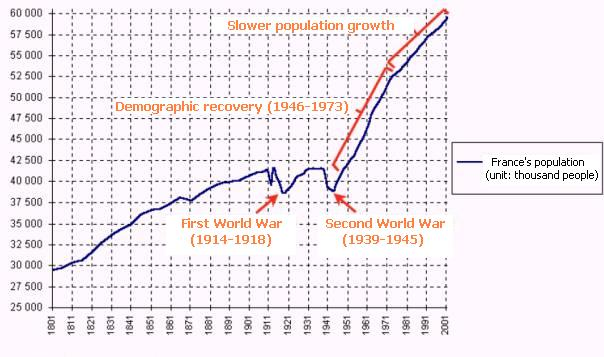
Two centuries of population growth

Starting around 1800, the historical evolution of the population in France has been atypical in Europe. Unlike the rest of Europe, there was no strong population growth in France in the 19th and first half of the 20th century. The birth rate in France diminished much earlier than in the rest of Europe in part because from the late 18th century inheritance laws dictated equal distribution of estates between heirs. The country's large population gave Napoleon a seemingly limitless supply of men for the Grande Armée, but the birth rate began to fall in the late 18th century; thus population growth was quite slow in the 19th century, and the nadir was reached in the first half of the 20th century when France, surrounded by the rapidly growing populations of Germany and the United Kingdom, had virtually zero growth. The slow growth of France's population in the 19th century was reflected in the country's very low emigration rate.

The French population only grew by 8.6% between 1871 and 1911, while Germany's grew by 60% and Britain's by 54%.

French concerns about the country's slow population growth began after its defeat in the Franco-Prussian War. For four years in the 1890s, the number of deaths exceeded the number of births. The National Alliance for the Growth of the French Population (ANAPF) was formed in 1896, and the Cognacq-Jay and other prizes were created for the parents of large families. Émile Zola's 1899 novel Fécondité is representative of contemporary concerns about the birthrate. France lost 10% of its active male population in World War I; the 1.3 million French deaths, along with even more births forgone by potential fathers being off at war, caused a drop of 3 million in the French population, and helped make Dénatalité a national obsession; by 1920 ANAPF had 40,000 members, and in July that year a new law strictly regulated abortion and contraception.

ANAPF proposed that parents of large families receive extra votes, and the belief that women's suffrage in other countries caused birth rates to decline helped defeat proposals before World War II to permit women to vote. The birth rate declined again after a brief baby boom from 1920 to 1923, and reached an all-time low during peacetime in the late 1930s. During the "hollow years" of the decade, the number of new conscripts declined because of the lack of births during World War I. From 1935 deaths exceeded births; the press widely discussed the country's decreasing population. Both left and right supported pro-natalist policies; even the French Communist Party ended its opposition to anti-birth control and anti-abortion laws in 1936, and its leader, Maurice Thorez, advocated for the "protection of family and childhood".

New laws in November 1938 and July 1939, the code de la famille, provided enough financial incentives for large families to double the income of a family with six children. The Vichy government approved of the laws and implemented them as part of its Travail, famille, patrie national motto, as did the postwar Provisional Government of the French Republic. Also, France encouraged immigration, chiefly from other European countries such as Italy, Poland, and Spain. (In fact, with its low birth rate, stagnating or declining native-born population, and role as a destination for migrants from other parts of Europe, France's situation before World War II was not unlike that of Germany today.)

=== After World War II ===
Historical population
Year	Pop.	±% p.a.
1806	29,107,000	—
1821	30,462,000	+0.30%
1831	32,569,000	+0.67%
1841	34,230,000	+0.50%
1851	35,783,000	+0.44%
1872	36,103,000	+0.04%
1881	37,672,000	+0.47%
1891	38,343,000	+0.18%
1901	38,962,000	+0.16%
1911	39,605,000	+0.16%
1921	39,108,000	−0.13%
1931	41,524,000	+0.60%
1946	40,125,230	−0.23%
1950	41,647,258	+0.94%
1960	45,464,797	+0.88%
1970	50,528,219	+1.06%
1980	53,731,387	+0.62%
1990	56,577,000	+0.52%
2000	58,858,198	+0.40%
2010	62,765,235	+0.64%
2020	65,269,154	+0.39%
2026	66,792,845	+0.39%

France experienced a baby boom after 1945; it reversed a long-term record of low birth rates. The government's pro-natalist policy of the 1930s, however, does not explain this sudden recovery, which was often portrayed in France as a "miracle". It was also atypical of the Western world: although there was a baby boom in other Western countries after the war, the baby boom in France was much stronger, and lasted longer than in most other Western countries (the United States was one of the few exceptions). In the 1950s and 1960s, France's population grew at 1% per year: the highest growth in the history of France, higher even than the high growth rates of the 18th or 19th century.

Since 1975, France's population growth rate has significantly diminished, but it still remains slightly higher than that of the rest of Europe, and much higher than at the end of the 19th century and during the first half of the 20th century. In the first decade of the third millennium, population growth in France was the highest in Europe, matched only by that of the Republic of Ireland, which, until recently, has also historically undergone stagnant growth and even decline relative to the rest of Europe. However, population growth of France is still lower than that of the United States, largely because of the latter's higher net migration rate.

=== Historical summary ===
The following compares the past, present, and future size of the French population with other entities in Europe and in the world. All statements refer to France as understood in its modern borders; this pertains also to other countries. Historians suggest that France was the most populous state in Europe from at least the period of Charlemagne and the Frankish Empire, if not earlier, to the 19th century. Population statistics prior to the modern era are historical estimates as official counts were not made.

- Until 1795 metropolitan France was the most populous country of Europe, ahead of Russia, and the fourth most populous country in the world, behind only China, India and Japan;
- Between 1795 and 1866, metropolitan France was the second most populous country of Europe, behind Russia, and the fourth most populous country in the world, behind China, India and Russia (having become more populous than Japan during this period);
- Between 1866 and 1909, metropolitan France was the third most populous country of Europe, behind Russia and Germany;
- Between 1909 and 1933, metropolitan France was the fourth most populous country of Europe, behind Russia, Germany, and the United Kingdom;
- Between 1933 and 1991, metropolitan France was the fifth most populous country of Europe, behind Russia, Germany, the United Kingdom, and Italy;
- In 1991, metropolitan France recovered its rank as the fourth most populous country of Europe, behind Russia, Germany, and the United Kingdom, overtaking Italy. Worldwide, France's ranking has fallen to twentieth most populous country;
- In 2005 it was projected that if current demographic trends continued (i.e. declining population in Germany, and slightly rising population in France and the UK), around 2050 metropolitan France could again surpass the population of Germany, becoming the most populous state in the European Union. In contrast, 2009 UN projections say that the stronger-growing United Kingdom could be more populous than France in 2050, leaving France third amongst European nations, behind Russia and the UK.

In the above list, Turkey is not considered a European country. Turkey was less populous than metropolitan France until 1992 but in 2024 was more populous than France, the UK and Germany.

View source data.
View source data.

View source data.
View source data.

== Population ==
=== Historical population figures ===
Demographic statistics according to the CIA World Factbook, unless otherwise indicated.

Please note:

- figures are for metropolitan France only, not including overseas departments and territories, as former French colonies and protectorates. Algeria and its départements, although they were an integral part of metropolitan France until 1962, are not included in the figures.
- to make comparisons easier, figures provided below are for the territory of metropolitan France within the borders of 2004. This was the real territory of France from 1860 to 1871, and again since 1919. Figures before 1860 have been adjusted to include Savoy and Nice, which only became part of France in 1860. Figures between 1795 and 1815 do not include the French départements in modern-day Belgium, Germany, the Netherlands, and Italy, although they were an integral part of France during that period. Figures between 1871 and 1919 have been adjusted to include Alsace and part of Lorraine, which both were at the time part of the German Empire.
- figures before 1801 are modern estimates which do not include for the Roman Empire parts of Gaul that were in Germany, Belgium, the Netherlands and Luxembourg; figures from 1801 (included) onwards are based on the official French censuses.

Year	Population	Year	Population	Year	Population
50 BC	2,500,000	1806	29,648,000	1896	40,158,000
1	5,500,000	1811	30,271,000	1901	40,681,000
120	7,200,000	1816	30,573,000	1906	41,067,000
400	5,500,000	1821	31,578,000	1911	41,415,000
850	7,000,000	1826	32,665,000	1921	39,108,000
1226	16,000,000	1831	33,595,000	1926	40,581,000
1345	20,200,000	1836	34,293,000	1931	41,524,000
1400	16,600,000	1841	34,912,000	1936	41,502,000
1457	19,700,000	1846	36,097,000	1946	40,506,639
1580	20,000,000	1851	36,472,000	1954	42,777,162
1594	18,500,000	1856	36,715,000	1962	46,519,997
1600	20,000,000	1861	37,386,000	1968	49,780,543
1670	18,000,000	1866	38,067,000	1975	52,655,864
1700	21,000,000	1872	37,653,000	1982	54,334,871
1715	19,200,000	1876	38,438,000	1990	56,615,155
1740	24,600,000	1881	39,239,000	1999	58,520,688
1792	28,000,000	1886	39,783,000	2006	61,399,733
1801	29,361,000	1891	39,946,000	2016	64,513,000

=== Population growth over time ===
Historical population of France

Source: Louis Henry and Yves Blayo.

Years	1740	1745	1750	1755	1760	1765	1770	1775	1780	1785	1790	1795
Total population in France métropolitaine (in millions)	24.6	24.6	24.5	25.0	25.7	26.1	26.6	27.0	27.55	27.65	28.1	28.1
Annual population growth rate (%)	1	3	20	28	14	19	15	21	4	16	0	36

Years	1800	1805	1810	1815	1820	1825	1830	1835	1840	1845	1850	1855	1860
Total population in France métropolitaine (in millions)	29.1	29.5	30.0	30.3	31.25	32.35	33.3	34.0	34.9	35.7	36.35	37.0	37.3
Annual population growth rate (%)	12	18	10	31	36	29	21	25	24	18	17	9	

=== Life expectancy and mortality ===
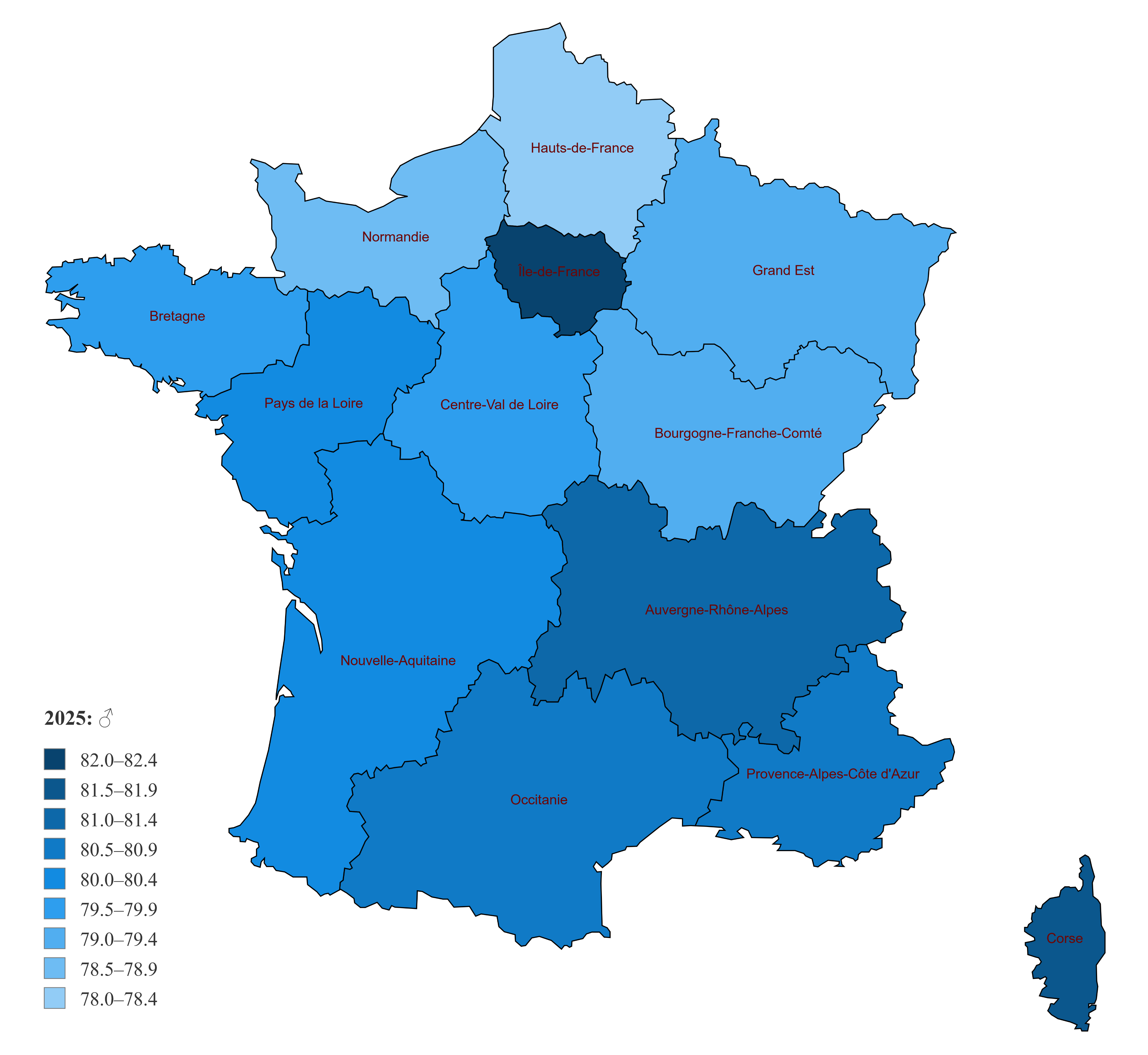
Life expectancy in the regions of metropolitan France in 2025 for male

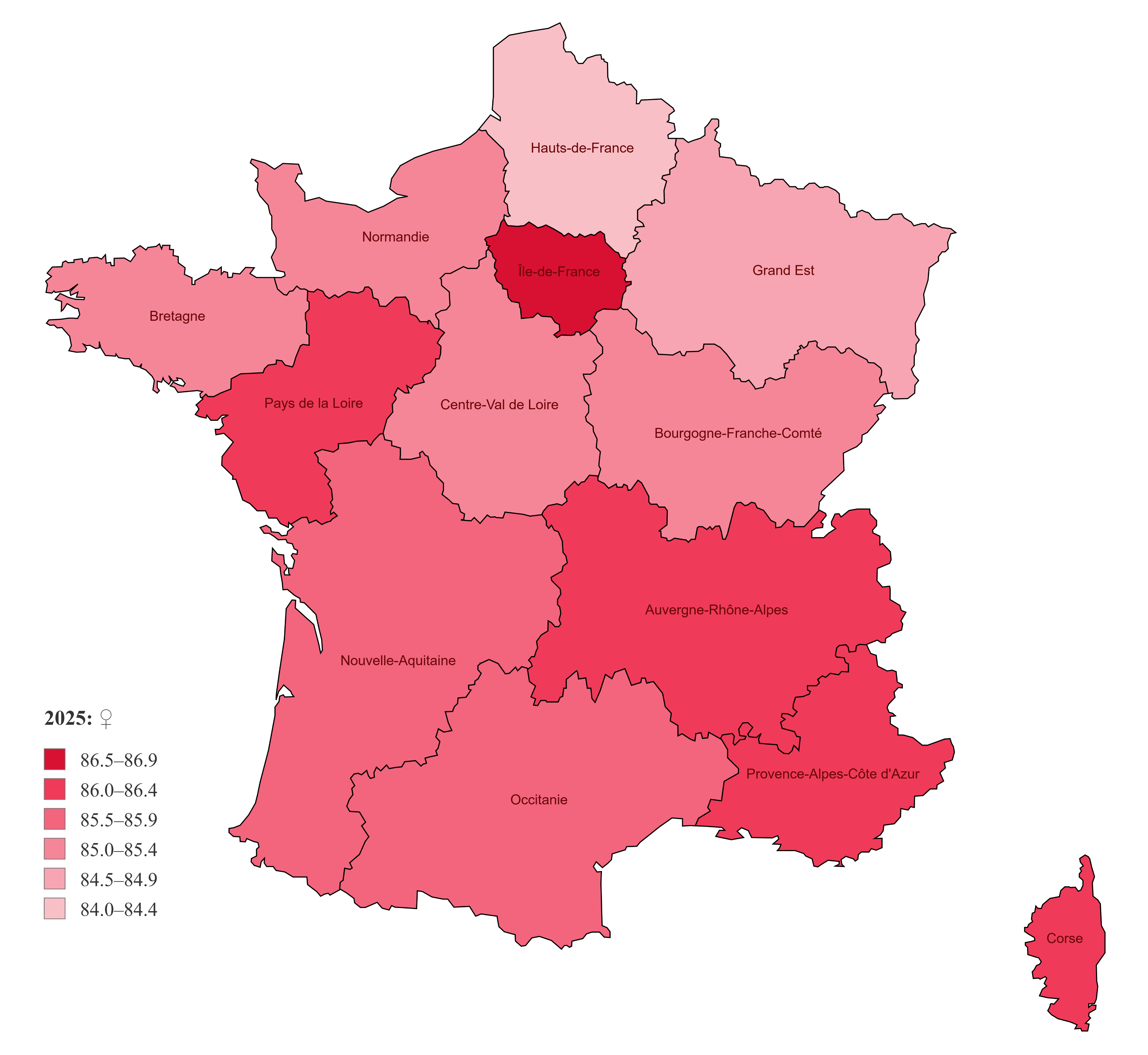
Life expectancy in the regions of metropolitan France in 2025 for female

Life expectancy in Metropolitan France from 1818 to 1950. Source: Our World In Data.

Death rate 9.6 deaths/1,000 population (2021 est.)

Years	1816	1820	1825	1830	1835	1840	1845	1850	1855	1860	1865	1870
Life expectancy in Metropolitan France	40.1	39.2	38.5	39.6	39.5	40.4	43.6	43.3	37.5	43.3	40.1	36.4

Years	1871	1872	1873	1874	1875	1876	1877	1878	1879	1880
Life expectancy in Metropolitan France	29.6	42.6	41.8	44.3	43.1	43.5	44.3	43.3	44.0	42.7

Years	1881	1882	1883	1884	1885	1886	1887	1888	1889	1890
Life expectancy in Metropolitan France	43.5	43.1	43.2	42.4	43.9	43.1	43.7	44.1	45.5	43.3

Years	1891	1892	1893	1894	1895	1896	1897	1898	1899	1900
Life expectancy in Metropolitan France	44.1	43.5	43.5	45.5	45.1	47.5	47.9	45.9	45.2	45.0

Years	1901	1902	1903	1904	1905	1906	1907	1908	1909	1910
Life expectancy in Metropolitan France	46.9	48.0	48.4	48.0	48.3	47.7	48.2	49.3	50.0	51.3

Years	1911	1912	1913	1914	1915	1916	1917	1918	1919	1920
Life expectancy in Metropolitan France	48.1	51.6	51.3	38.2	36.3	40.2	43.1	34.8	47.6	51.5

Years	1921	1922	1923	1924	1925	1926	1927	1928	1929	1930
Life expectancy in Metropolitan France	52.6	54.9	54.6	55.2	54.3	54.0	55.7	55.4	54.2	56.8

Years	1931	1932	1933	1934	1935	1936	1937	1938	1939	1940
Life expectancy in Metropolitan France	56.9	57.2	57,7	58.3	58.3	58.8	59.1	59.0	59.6	49.6

Years	1941	1942	1943	1944	1945	1946	1947	1948	1949	1950
Life expectancy in Metropolitan France	57.7	57.4	53.3	47.2	54.9	62.4	63.9	65.8	64.9	66.4

Development of life expectancy in France from 1816 to 2024

Period	Life expectancy in Years	Period	Life expectancy in Years
1950–1955	67.2	1985–1990	76.1
1955–1960	69.3	1990–1995	77.3
1960–1965	70.7	1995–2000	78.4
1965–1970	71.4	2000–2005	79.6
1970–1975	72.4	2005–2010	80.9
1975–1980	73.6	2010–2015	81.9
1980–1985	74.7	2015–2020	82.4

=== Age structure ===
Age structures of the France métropolitaine from the year 1740 to 2021. Source: Louis Henry and Yves Blayo.

Median age (2021 INSEE est.)
total: 41.1 years. Country comparison to the world: 40th
male: 39.6 years
female: 42.6 years

Ages	1740	1745	1750	1755	1760	1765	1770	1775	1780	1785	1790	1795
0–19 years	42.1	42.2	41.6	41.1	41.2	41.0	41.1	40.7	40.0	40.15	40.1	40.3
20–59 years	49.6	49.7	50.3	50.7	50.3	50.15	50	50.35	51.25	51.3	51.4	50.95
60 years and over	8.3	8.1	8.1	8.2	8.5	8.85	8.9	8.95	8.75	8.55	8.5	8.75
Total (%)	100	100	100	100	100	100	100	100	100	100	100	100

Ages	1800	1805	1810	1815	1820	1825	1830	1835	1840	1845	1850	1855	1860
0–19 years	41.0	41.25	41.1	41.6	40.7	40.55	40.6	40.25	39.6	38.95	38.4	37.7	36.95
20–59 years	50.05	49.75	49.7	48.75	49.25	49.45	49.6	50.25	50.9	51.4	51.95	52.65	52.65
60 years and over	8.95	9.0	9.2	9.65	10.05	10.0	9.8	9.5	9.5	9.65	9.65	9.65	10.4
Total (%)	100	100	100	100	100	100	100	100	100	100	100	100	100

Ages	2000	2010	2020	2021
0–19 years	25.8	24.8	24.1	23.9
20–59 years	53.8	52.6	49.4	49.3
60–64 years	4.6	6.0	6.1	6.1
65 years and over	15.8	16.6	20.4	20.7
Total (%)	100	100	100	100

Sex ratio
at birth: 1.05 male(s)/female
0–14 years: 1.05 male(s)/female
15–24 years: 1.05 male(s)/female
25–54 years: 1.02 male(s)/female
55–64 years: 0.93 male(s)/female
65 years and over: 0.77 male(s)/female
total population: 0.96 male(s)/female (2020 est.))

Dependency ratios
total dependency ratio: 62.4
youth dependency ratio: 28.7
elderly dependency ratio: 33.7
potential support ratio: 3 (2020 est.)

=== Fertility ===
Fertility rate of France overtime from 1946 to 2023

France has a high fertility rate compared to other European countries; this rate has increased after reaching a historic low in the early 1990s.

- Total fertility rate: 2.01 children born per woman for metropolitan France and the overseas departments (in 2012), 2.00 for metropolitan France alone (in 2010).
- Mean age of women having their first birth: 29.9 years-old.

The table below gives the average number of children according to the place of birth of women. An immigrant woman is a woman who was born outside France and who did not have French citizenship at birth.

In 2021 there was 11.8 births/1,000 population. Total fertility rate (2020 data by INSEE) 1.83 children born/woman.

Mother's mean age at first birth
28.5 years (2015)

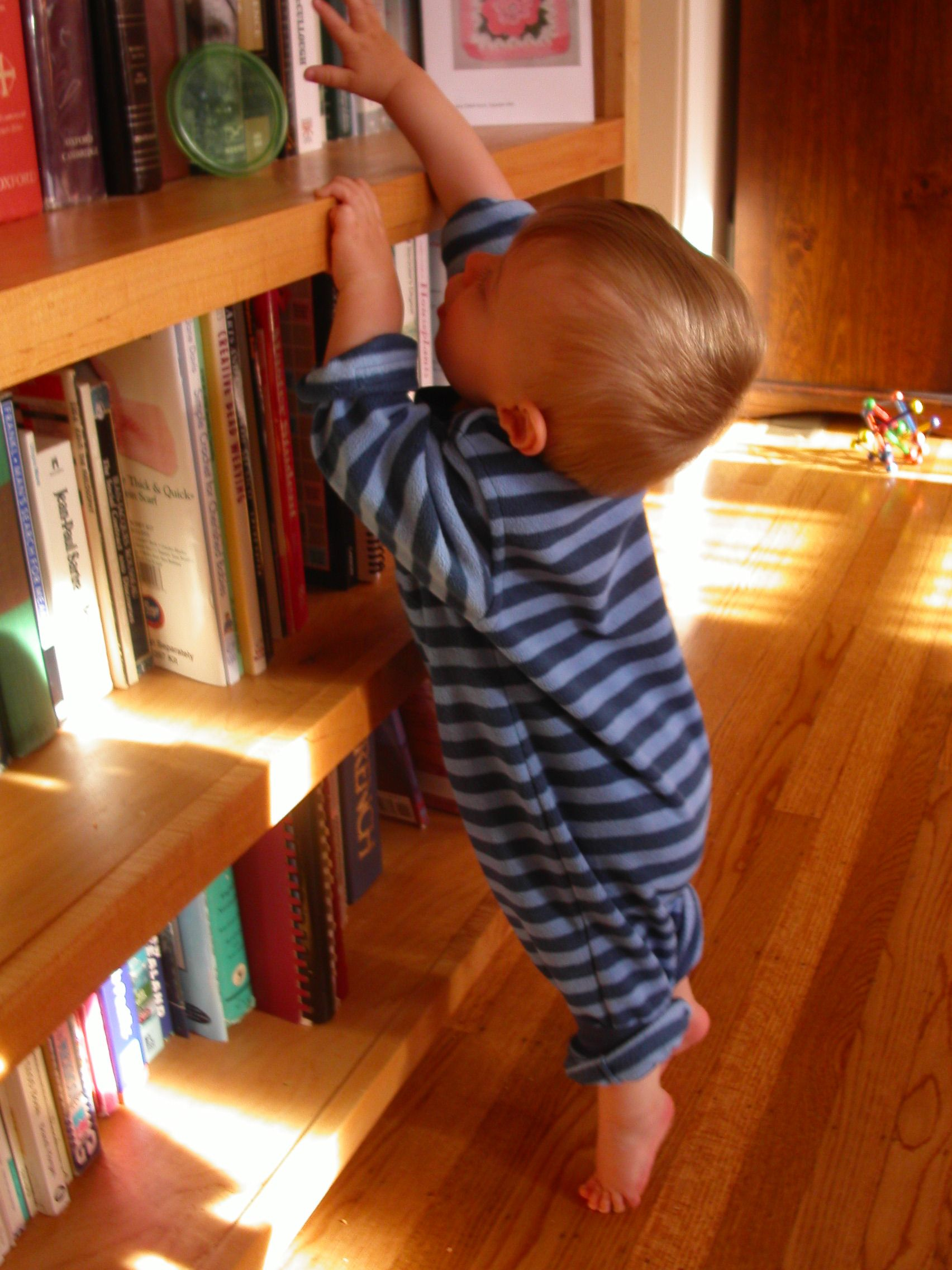
At 1.83 children born per woman, France has the highest total fertility rate in the European Union (as of 2020)

	Fertlity rate in 2014	Average number of children in France (1991–1998)	Average number of children in country of origin (1990–1999)
All women living in metropolitan France	1,99	1.74	
Women born in Metropolitan France	1,88	1.70	
Immigrant women	2,75	2.16	
Women born in overseas France		1.86	
Immigrant women (country of birth)			
Spain	1,81	1.52	1.23
Italy	1,81	1.60	1.24
Portugal	2,02	1.96	1.49
Other EU		1.66	1.44
Turkey	3,12	3.21	2.16
Other Europe	2,22	1.68	1.41
Algeria	3,69	2.57	1.78
Morocco	3,47	2.97	3.28
Tunisia	3,50	2.90	2.73
Other Africa	2,91	2.86	5.89
Asia (mostly China)	2,11	1.77	2.85
The Americas and Oceania	2,23	2.00	2.54

==== Total fertility rate in the 19th century ====
The total fertility rate is the number of children born per woman. It is based on fairly good data for the entire period. Sources: Our World In Data and Gapminder Foundation.

Years	1800	1801	1802	1803	1804	1805	1806	1807	1808	1809	1810
Total Fertility Rate in Metropolitan France	4.41	4.36	4.31	4.26	4.21	4.16	4.1	4.05	4	3.95	3.9

Years	1860	1861	1862	1863	1864	1865	1866	1867	1868	1869	1870
Total Fertility Rate in Metropolitan France	3.4	3.51	3.46	3.53	3.51	3.53	3.53	3.55	3.49	3.49	3.44

Years	1871	1872	1873	1874	1875	1876	1877	1878	1879	1880
Total Fertility Rate in Metropolitan France	3.08	3.59	3.51	3.53	3.51	3.57	3.49	3.44	3.44	3.36

Years	1881	1882	1883	1884	1885	1886	1887	1888	1889	1890
Total Fertility Rate in Metropolitan France	3.4	3.4	3.38	3.38	3.32	3.26	3.22	3.16	3.12	2.95

Years	1891	1892	1893	1894	1895	1896	1897	1898	1899
Total Fertility Rate in Metropolitan France	3.03	2.96	3.02	2.94	2.86	2.98	2.92	2.87	2.88

==== Births by country of birth of the parents ====
About 22% of newborns in France between 2006 and 2008 had at least one foreign-born grandparent (9% born in another European country, 8% born in the Maghreb and 2% born in another region of the world).

As of 2022, 32.4% of newborns in France had at least one foreign-born parent and 28.5% had at least one parent born outside of Europe (EU 28) (parents born in overseas territories are considered as born in France).

The table below gives the number of children born in metropolitan France according to the place of birth of both parents.

Birth country of parents	Years																		
Birth country of parents	1998	1999	2000	2001	2002	2003	2004	2005	2006	2007	2008	2009	2010		2011	2012	2013	2014	
Birth country of parents	Number	Number	Number	Number	Number	Number	Number	Number	Number	Number	Number	Number	Number	%	Number	Number	Number	Number	%
Both parents born in France	566 447	576 537	601 268	595 286	580 999	575 985	574 687	575 659	590 163	579 515	585 427	578 052	583 600	72.7%	604 077	598 473	583 864	579 106	70.75%
One parent born in France, other foreign-born	101 511	98 687	101 498	102 013	103 930	106 677	110 258	114 090	119 159	119 587	121 845	125 058	129 025	16.1%	119 114	119 957	119 643	123 855	15.13%
Father born in EU28, mother born in France	13 194	12 858	13 060	12 447	11 732	11 442	10 811	10 667	10 455	10 188	9 975	9 526	9 549	1.2%	9 961	9 637	9 414	9 235	1.13%
Father not born in EU28, mother born in France	44 891	43 807	45 612	46 459	47 695	49 790	52 244	54 176	56 886	56 626	57 955	60 362	62 478	7.8%	55 209	55 488	55 397	56 370	6.89%
Father born in France, mother born in EU28	13 020	12 647	12 411	11 881	11 439	11 119	10 930	10 827	10 794	10 575	10 562	10 585	10 418	1.3%	10 104	9 761	9 772	10 058	1.23%
Father born in France, mother not born in EU28	30 406	29 375	30 415	31 226	33 064	34 326	36 273	38 420	41 024	42 198	43 353	44 585	46 580	5.8%	43 840	45 071	45 060	48 192	5.89%
Both parents foreign-born	70 122	69 567	72 016	73 646	76 701	78 802	82 871	84 606	87 574	86 883	88 772	90 310	89 599	11.2%	100 203	102 617	108 003	115 604	14.12%
Both parents born in EU28	6 681	6 157	5 780	5 524	5 159	5 369	5 426	5 372	5 778	5 891	6 276	6 442	6 694	0.8%	7 798	8 419	8 884	9 726	1.19%
Both parents not born in EU28	60 281	60 636	63 299	65 406	68 788	70 552	74 537	76 348	78 700	78 020	79 405	80 641	79 698	9.9%	89 163	91 049	95 721	102 319	12.50%
Father born in EU27, mother not born in EU28	1 188	1 047	1 116	1 035	1 038	1 075	1 150	1 100	1 256	1 190	1 226	1 268	1 258	0.2%	1 469	1 436	1 494	1 554	0.19%
Father not born in EU27, Mother born in EU28	1 972	1 727	1 821	1 681	1 716	1 806	1 758	1 786	1 840	1 782	1 865	1 959	1 949	0.2%	1 773	1 713	1 904	2 005	0.24%
Total of newborns	738 080	744 791	774 782	770 945	761 630	761 464	767 816	774 355	796 896	785 985	796 044	793 420	802 224	100%	823 394	821 047	811 510	818 565	100%

==== Births by citizenship of the parents ====
As of 2022, 74.0% of newborns in France had two parents with French citizenship, 14.4% had one French parent, and 11.5% had two non-French parents.

The table below gives the number of children born in metropolitan France according to the citizenship of both parents.

Citizenship of parents	Year																		
Citizenship of parents	1998	1999	2000		2001	2002	2003	2004	2005	2006	2007	2008	2009	2010		2011	2012	2013	2014
Citizenship of parents	Number	Number	Number	%	Number	Number	Number	Number	Number	Number	Number	Number	Number	Number	%	Number	Number	Number	Number
Both French parents	630 995	633 788	657 576	84.9%	648 506	633 294	629 014	628 062	630 481	645 879	635 082	640 596	634 153	642 816	80.1%	659 834	651 577	638 576	634 027
One French parent, other non-French	57 897	61 577	66 636	8.6%	69 954	74 590	78 318	84 013	88 965	94 888	96 314	100 464	103 704	106 622	13.3%	105 767	108 905	109 809	115 647
French mother, father with European citizenship (EU28)	9 146	9 175	9 554	1.2%	9 397	8 866	9 019	8 749	8 503	8 571	8 509	8 349	8 197	8 829	1.1%	8 300	8 270	8 120	8 019
French mother, father with non-European citizenship (EU28)	25 117	26 720	29 592	3.8%	31 463	33 820	35 756	38 923	41 061	43 698	43 603	45 579	46 753	46 456	5.8%	44 600	45 599	45 866	47 184
French father, mother with European citizenship (EU28)	7 535	7 551	7 409	1.0%	7 235	7 359	7 097	7 172	7 324	7 395	7 420	7 642	7 862	7 874	1.0%	7 856	7 747	7 901	8 162
French father, mother with non-European citizenship (EU28)	16 099	18 131	20 081	2.6%	21 859	24 545	26 446	29 169	32 077	35 224	36 782	38 894	40 892	43 463	5.4%	45 011	47 289	47 922	52 282
Both non-French parents	49 188	49 426	50 570	6.5%	52 485	53 746	54 132	55 741	54 909	56 129	54 589	54 984	55 563	52 786	6.6%	57 793	60 565	63 125	68 891
Both parents with European citizenship (EU28)	6 715	6 359	6 166	0.8%	5 808	5 507	5 589	5 670	5 667	6 085	6 214	6 623	6 803	6 958	0.9%	7 895	8 556	9 176	10 217
Both parents with non-European citizenship (EU28)	41 268	41 845	42 985	5.5%	45 265	46 807	46 921	48 364	47 440	48 091	46 301	46 167	46 435	43 454	5.4%	47 419	49 262	50 860	55 056
Father with European citizenship (EU28), mother with non-European citizenship (EU28)	440	502	565	0.1%	589	571	685	733	797	937	967	1 062	1 141	1 235	0.2%	1 400	1 555	1 700	2 091
Father with non-European citizenship (EU28), mother with European citizenship (EU28)	765	720	854	0.1%	823	861	937	974	1 005	1 016	1 107	1 132	1 184	1 139	0.2%	1 079	1 192	1 389	1 527
Total of newborns	738 080	744 791	774 782	100%	770 945	761 630	761 464	767 816	774 355	796 896	785 985	796 044	793 420	802 224	100%	823 394	821 047	811 510	818 565

=== Population projections ===
Population projections of France by the UN up to 2100

The population of France is projected to hit the 70 million mark between the year 2025/2030 and to overtake Germany's between 2050/2060, with 75.6 million French for 71 million Germans in 2060, while the UK is predicted to overtake France by 2030. By 2080, the population of France is estimated to reach 78.8 million (including the overseas departments, but not the overseas territories).

Figures from eurostat for metropolitan France and the overseas departments:

Year	Population
2010	64,677,000
2020	67,658,000
2030	70,396,000
2040	72,767,000
2050	74,297,000
2060	75,599,000
2070	77,109,000
2080	78,842,000

== Vital statistics ==
Live births and deaths over time in Metropolitan France

The vital statistics below refer to Metropolitan France and do not include the Overseas France, territories and New Caledonia. Source:

Notable events in French demographics:

- 1804–1815 – Napoleonic Wars
- 1832, 1849, 1854, 1866, 1884 – Major Cholera outbreaks
- 1854–1856 – Crimean War
- 1870–1871 – Franco-Prussian War loss of Alsace and German Lorraine
- 1899–1900 Russian flu
- 1914–1918 – First World War
- 1918 Spanish flu
- 1928–1929 Influenza
- 1940–1945 – Second World War
- 1962 – Exodus at the end of Algerian War
- 2020–2023 COVID-19 pandemic

Year	Average population (jan 1)	Live births	Deaths	Natural change	Crude birth rate (per 1000)	Crude death rate (per 1000)	Natural change (per 1000)	Crude Migration Rate (per 1000)	Total fertility rate (Note: In fertility rates, 2.1 and above is a stable population and has been marked blue, 2 and below leads to an aging population and the result is that the population decreases.)	Infant mortality rate (per 1,000 live births)	Life expectancy at birth (males)	Life expectancy at birth (females)
1800	27,349,003	903,688	761,813	141,873	33.0	27.85						
1801	27,859,685	918,703	772,058	146,645	32.9							
1802	28,228,498	919,020	881,892	37,128	32.55							
1803	28,597,305	907,305	897,732	9,571	31.7							
1804	28,966,112	912,613	833,436	79,177	31.5							
1805	29,020,000	931,991	818,983	113,008	31.9							
1806	29,107,425	916,179	781,827	134,352	31.5							
1807	29,241,777	925,117	803,174	121,943	31.6							
1808	29,363,720	912,840	773,778	139,067	31.1							
1809	29,502,787	933,391	748,665	184,736	31.6							
1810	29,687,523	931,799	730,282	201,517	31.4							
1811	29,889,040	926,904	766,275	160,629	31.0							
1812	30,049,669	883,945	769,531	114,414	29.4							
1813	29,924,767	895,580	774,926	120,654	29.9							
1814	29,799,865	994,082	872,980	121,102	33.3							
1815	29,574,963	953,141	762,949	190,192	32.2							
1816	29,250,061	968,934	723,699	245,235	33.1							
1817	29,539,587	944,576	750,730	193,842	32.0							
1818	29,733,429	914,577	750,633	159,030	30.7							
1819	29,892,459	987,567	755,547	201,571	33.0							
1820	30,094,030	951,981	785,996	190,681	31.6							
1821	30,461,875	965,364	769,300	224,062	31.7							
1822	30,757,550	972,632	741,302	195,595	31.6							
1823	30,954,151	963,327	743,467	219,860	31.1							
1824	31,174,011	984,158	764,138	220,020	31.6							
1825	31,395,031	973,502	800,074	173,428	31.0				3.78			
1826	31,858,937	992,266	837,160	154,656	31.1				3.77			
1827	31,994,633	980,135	791,565	188,570	30.6				3.76			
1828	32,183,200	976,949	837,516	139,433	30.3				3.75			
1829	32,322,633	965,470	802,624	162,846	29.9				3.74			
1830	32,485,479	968,000	808,400	159,600	29.7				3.73			
1831	32,569,223	986,843	800,430	186,413					3.72			
1832	32,831,247	937,434	933,800	3,634					3.70			
1833	32,834,881	970,178	812,478	157,700					3.68			
1834	32,992,581	986,490	918,028	68,463					3.67			
1835	33,061,433	993,833	816,413	177,420					3.65			
1836	33,540,910	979,746	747,668	232,078					3.63			
1837	33,751,227	943,741	853,071	90,670					3.62			
1838	33,790,000	963,099	817,501	145,598					3.59			
1839	33,987,495	958,189	771,859	186,330					3.57			
1840	33,173,825	952,387	808,989	143,398					3.56			
1841	34,230,178	976,753	794,908	181,845					3.55			
1842	34,457,282	982,990	825,938	157,052					3.54			
1843	34,614,334	978.396	799,008	179,388					3.53			
1844	34,793,722	959,484	768,026	191,458					3.53			
1845	34,985,180	982,527	741,985	240,542					3.52			
1846	34,401,761	965,886	820,918	144,948					3.51			
1847	35,521,746	901,861	849,054	52,807					3.51			
1848	35,574,553	940,156	836,693	103,463					3.50			
1849	35,678,016	985,848	973,471	12,377					3.50			
1850	35,690,393	954,240	761,610	192,630					3.49			
1851	35,783,170	979,907	817,440	172,134					3.49			
1852	35,953,984	965,080	810,695	154,222					3.42			
1853	36,108,206	936,967	795,596	141,360					3.38			
1854	36,249,566	923,461	992,779	-69,318					3.31			
1855	36,180,248	902,336	937,942	-35,606					3.24			
1856	36,139,364	952,116	837,082	115,034					3.40			
1857	36,268,793	940,709	858,785	81,924					3.36			
1858	36,350,717	969,343	874,023	95,320					3.46			
1859	36,445,874	1,017,896	879,333	138,563					3.41			
1860	36,484,437	956,878	781,635	175,240					3.40			
1861	37,386,313	1,005,078	866,597	138,481					3.51			
1862	37,517,752	995,167	812,978	182,189					3.46			
1863	37,699,941	1,012,794	846,917	165,877					3.53			
1864	37,865,818	1,005,880	860,314	145,550					3.51			
1865	38,011,368	1,005,753	921,887	83,866					3.53			
1866	38,067,064	1,000,258	884,573	121,685					3.53			
1867	38,188,749	1,007,755	806,887	140,868					3.55			
1868	38,329,617	984,140	922,038	62,102					3.49			
1869	36,855,178	948,526	864,320	84,206					3.49			
1870	36,985,212	943,515	1,046,909	−103,394					3.44			
1871	36,544,067	826,121	1,271,011	−444,889					3.08			
1872	36,110,000	966,000	793,064	172,936					3.59			
1873	36,320,000	946,301	844,588	101,713					3.51			
1874	36,480,000	954,052	781,706	172,346					3.53			
1875	36,730,000	950,975	845,002	105,973					3.51			
1876	36,900,000	966,682	834,074	132,608					3.57			
1877	37,080,000	944,576	801,954	142,622					3.49			
1878	37,250,000	937,317	839,176	98,141					3.44			
1879	37,320,000	936,529	839,882	96,647					3.44			
1880	37,440,000	920,177	858,337	61,840					3.36			
1881	37,650,000	937,057	828,288	108,229					3.40			
1882	37,750,000	935,566	838,539	97,027					3.40			
1883	37,850,000	937,944	841,101	96,843					3.38			
1884	37,980,000	937,758	858,784	78,974					3.38			
1885	38,040,000	922,361	836,897	85,464					3.32			
1886	38,210,000	912,782	860,222	52,560					3.26			
1887	38,270,000	899,333	843,797	56,536					3.22			
1888	38,230,000	882,639	837,867	44,772					3.16			
1889	38,340,000	880,579	794,933	85,646					3.12			
1890	38,440,000	838,059	876,505	−38,456					2.95			
1891	38,380,000	866,377	876,882	−10,505					3.03			
1892	38,350,000	855,847	875,888	−20,041					2.96			
1893	38,360,000	874,672	867,526	7,146					3.02			
1894	38,380,000	855,388	815,620	39,768					2.94			
1895	38,420,000	834,173	851,986	−17,813					2.86			
1896	38,400,000	865,586	771,886	93,700	22.5	20.1	2.4		2.98			
1897	38,520,000	859,107	751,019	108,088	22.3	19.5	2.8		2.92			
1898	38,600,000	843,993	810,073	33,920	21.9	21.0	0.9		2.87			
1899	38,800,000	847,627	816,233	31,915	21.9	21.0	0.9		2.88			
1900	38,900,000	827,297	853,285	−25,988	21.3	21.9	−0.6		2.80			
1901	40,710,000	917,075	825,315	91,760	22.5	20.3	2.3	−42.0	2.903			
1902	40,810,000	904,434	801,379	103,055	22.2	19.6	2.5	2.0	2.853			
1903	40,910,000	884,498	794,566	89,932	21.6	19.4	2.2	0.3	2.784			
1904	41,000,000	877,091	802,536	74,555	21.4	19.6	1.8	−0.6	2.748			
1905	41,050,000	865,604	812,338	53,266	21.1	19.8	1.3	−0.1	2.706			
1906	41,100,000	864,745	820,051	44,694	21.0	20.0	1.1	−1.1	2.700			
1907	41,140,000	829,632	830,871	−1,239	20.2	20.2	−0.3	2.5	2.576			
1908	41,190,000	848,982	784,415	64,567	20.6	19.0	1.6	−0.4	2.636			
1909	41,240,000	824,739	792,798	31,941	20.0	19.2	0.8	1.9	2.557			
1910	41,350,000	828,140	737,877	90,263	20.0	17.8	2.2	−0.5	2.571			
1911	41,420,000	793,506	813,653	−20,147	19.2	19.6	−0.5	3.2	2.462			
1912	41,530,000	801,642	726,848	74,794	19.3	17.5	1.8	0.4	2.485			
1913	41,620,000	795,851	736,937	58,914	19.1	17.7	1.4	−1.2	2.468			
1914	41,630,000	757,931	774,931	−17,000	18.2	18.6	−0.4	−23.9	2.335			
1915	40,620,000	482,968	747,968	−265,000	11.9	18.4	−6.5	−8.3	1.519			
1916	40,020,000	384,676	697,676	−313,000	9.6	17.4	−7.8	−7.2	1.230			
1917	39,420,000	412,744	712,744	−300,000	10.5	18.1	−7.6	−3.8	1.342			
1918	38,670,000	472,816	867,816	−395,000	12.2	22.4	−10.2	8.4	1.559			
1919	38,600,000	506,960	739,901	−232,941	13.1	19.2	−6.0	13.8	1.590			
1920	38,900,000	838,137	675,676	162,461	21.5	17.4	4.2	2.0	2.695			
1921	39,140,000	816,555	697,904	118,651	20.9	17.8	3.0	1.3	2.601			
1922	39,310,000	764,373	692,322	72,051	19.4	17.6	1.8	9.4	2.423			
1923	39,750,000	765,888	670,326	95,562	19.3	16.9	2.4	8.2	2.407			
1924	40,170,000	757,873	683,296	74,577	18.9	17.0	1.9	5.3	2.356			
1925	40,460,000	774,455	712,211	62,244	19.1	17.6	1.5	4.7	2.388			
1926	40,710,000	771,690	716,966	54,724	19.0	17.6	1.3	0.2	2.368			
1927	40,770,000	748,102	679,809	68,293	18.3	16.8	1.5	1.2	2.290			
1928	40,880,000	753,570	678,269	75,301	18.4	16.6	1.8	1.6	2.305			
1929	41,020,000	734,140	742,732	−8,592	17.9	18.1	−0.2	8.0	2.241			
1930	41,340,000	754,020	652,953	101,067	18.2	15.8	2.4	2.7	2.295			
1931	41,550,000	737,611	682,816	54,795	17.8	16.4	1.3	−2.3	2.247			
1932	41,510,000	726,299	663,705	62,594	17.5	16.0	1.5	−1.3	2.226			
1933	41,520,000	682,394	664,133	18,261	16.4	16.0	0.4	0.8	2.111			
1934	41,570,000	681,518	637,713	43,805	16.4	15.3	1.1	−1.6	2.141			
1935	41,550,000	643,870	661,722	−17,852	15.5	15.9	−0.4	−0.8	2.070			
1936	41,500,000	634,344	645,844	−11,500	15.3	15.6	−0.3	1.0	2.092			
1937	41,530,000	621,453	632,896	−11,443	15.0	15.2	−0.3	1.0	2.099			
1938	41,560,000	615,582	650,832	−35,250	14.8	15.7	−0.8	−0.4	2.128			
1939	41,510,000	615,599	645,677	−30,078	14.8	15.6	−0.7	−19.1	2.166			
1940	40,690,000	561,281	740,281	−179,000	13.8	18.2	−4.4	-26.8	2.003			
1941	39,420,000	522,261	675,261	−153,000	13.2	17.1	−3.9	−1.2	1.854			
1942	39,220,000	575,261	656,261	−81,000	14.7	16.7	−2.1	−7.1	2.043			
1943	38,860,000	615,780	626,780	−11,000	15.8	16.1	−0.3	2.0	2.186			
1944	38,770,000	629,878	666,878	−37,000	16.2	17.2	−1.0	24.0	2.249			
1945	39,660,000	645,899	643,899	2,000	16.3	16.2	0.1	11.6	2.310			
1946	40,125,230	843,904	545,880	298,024	20.9	13.5	7.4	0.7	2.998	77.8	59.9	65.2
1947	40,448,254	870,472	538,157	332,315	21.4	13.2	8.2	3.2	3.037	71.1	61.2	66.7
1948	40,910,569	870,836	513,210	357,626	21.2	12.5	8.7	1.1	3.020	55.9	62.7	68.8
1949	41,313,195	872,661	573,598	299,063	21.0	13.8	7.2	0.9	3.004	60.3	62.2	67.6
1950	41,647,258	862,310	534,480	327,830	20.6	12.8	7.8	0.9	2.947	52.0	63.4	69.2
1951	42,010,088	826,722	565,829	260,893	19.6	13.4	6.2	0.7	2.806	50.8	63.1	68.9
1952	42,300,981	822,204	524,831	297,373	19.4	12.4	7.0	0.5	2.777	45.2	64.4	70.2
1953	42,618,354	804,696	556,983	247,713	18.8	13.0	5.8	0.5	2.704	41.9	64.3	70.3
1954	42,885,138	810,754	518,892	291,862	18.8	12.1	6.8	1.2	2.714	40.7	65.0	71.2
1955	43,227,872	805,917	526,322	279,595	18.6	12.1	6.4	2.8	2.684	38.6	65.2	71.5
1956	43,627,467	806,916	545,700	261,216	18.4	12.4	6.0	3.9	2.674	36.2	65.2	71.7
1957	44,058,683	816,467	532,107	284,360	18.4	12.0	6.4	5.0	2.695	33.8	65.5	72.2
1958	44,563,043	812,215	500,596	311,619	18.1	11.2	7.0	3.1	2.684	31.4	66.8	73.4
1959	45,014,662	829,249	509,114	320,135	18.3	11.3	7.1	2.9	2.752	29.6	66.8	73.2
1960	45,464,797	819,819	520,960	298,859	17.9	11.4	6.5	3.2	2.740	27.4	67.0	73.6
1961	45,903,656	838,633	500,289	338,344	18.2	10.8	7.3	4.0	2.824	25.7	67.5	74.4
1962	46,422,000	832,353	541,147	291,206	17.7	11.5	6.2	18.6	2.796	25.7	67.0	73.9
1963	47,573,406	868,876	557,852	311,024	18.2	11.7	6.5	3.7	2.896	25.6	66.8	73.8
1964	48,059,029	877,804	520,033	357,771	18.2	10.8	7.4	3.1	2.915	23.4	67.7	74.8
1965	48,561,800	865,688	543,696	321,992	17.8	11.2	6.6	1.5	2.849	21.9	67.5	74.7
1966	48,953,792	863,527	528,782	334,745	17.6	10.8	6.8	1.8	2.801	21.7	67.8	75.2
1967	49,373,537	840,568	543,033	297,535	17.0	11.0	6.0	1.1	2.671	20.7	67.8	75.2
1968	49,723,072	835,796	553,441	282,355	16.7	11.1	5.7	2.0	2.588	20.4	67.8	75.2
1969	50,107,735	842,245	573,335	268,910	16.7	11.4	5.3	3.1	2.534	19.6	67.4	75.1
1970	50,528,219	850,381	542,277	308,104	16.7	10.7	6.1	3.6	2.480	18.2	68.4	75.9
1971	51,016,234	881,284	554,151	327,133	17.2	10.8	6.4	2.8	2.497	17.2	68.3	75.9
1972	51,485,953	877,506	549,900	327,606	17.0	10.6	6.3	2.1	2.419	16.0	68.5	76.2
1973	51,915,873	857,186	558,782	298,404	16.4	10.7	5.7	2.1	2.309	15.4	68.7	76.3
1974	52,320,725	801,218	552,551	248,667	15.3	10.5	4.7	0.6	2.112	14.6	68.9	76.7
1975	52,600,000	745,065	560,353	184,712	14.1	10.6	3.5	0.3	1.927	13.8	69.0	76.9
1976	52,798,338	720,395	557,114	163,281	13.6	10.5	3.1	1.1	1.829	12.5	69.2	77.2
1977	53,019,005	744,744	536,221	208,523	14.0	10.1	3.9	0.9	1.862	11.4	69.7	77.8
1978	53,271,566	737,062	546,916	190,146	13.8	10.2	3.6	0.3	1.822	10.7	69.8	77.9
1979	53,481,073	757,354	541,805	215,549	14.1	10.1	4.0	0.7	1.855	10.0	70.1	78.3
1980	53,731,387	800,376	547,107	253,269	14.9	10.2	4.7	0.8	1.945	10.0	70.2	78.4
1981	54,028,630	805,483	554,823	250,660	14.9	10.2	4.6	1.1	1.946	9.7	70.4	78.5
1982	54,335,000	797,223	543,104	254,119	14.6	10.0	4.7	1.1	1.912	9.5	70.7	78.9
1983	54,649,984	748,525	559,655	188,870	13.7	10.2	3.4	1.1	1.784	9.1	70.7	78.8
1984	54,894,854	759,939	542,490	217,449	13.8	9.9	4.0	0.8	1.802	8.3	71.2	79.3
1985	55,157,303	768,431	552,496	215,935	13.9	10.0	3.9	0.7	1.814	8.3	71.3	79.4
1986	55,411,238	778,468	546,926	231,542	14.0	9.8	4.2	0.7	1.831	8.0	71.5	79.7
1987	55,681,780	767,828	527,466	240,362	13.8	9.4	4.3	0.8	1.801	7.8	72.0	80.3
1988	55,966,142	771,268	524,600	246,668	13.7	9.3	4.4	1.0	1.805	7.8	72.3	80.5
1989	56,269,810	765,473	529,283	236,190	13.6	9.4	4.2	1.3	1.788	7.5	72.5	80.6
1990	56,577,000	762,407	526,201	236,206	13.4	9.3	4.2	0.5	1.778	7.3	72.7	81.0
1991	56,840,661	759,056	524,685	234,371	13.3	9.2	4.1	0.6	1.770	7.3	72.9	81.2
1992	57,110,533	743,658	521,530	222,128	13.0	9.1	3.9	0.6	1.733	6.8	73.2	81.5
1993	57,369,161	711,610	532,263	179,347	12.4	9.3	3.1	0.3	1.660	6.5	73.3	81.5
1994	57,565,008	710,993	519,965	191,028	12.3	9.0	3.3	0	1.663	5.9	73.6	81.8
1995	57,752,535	729,609	531,618	197,991	12.6	9.2	3.4	−0.2	1.713	4.9	73.8	81.9
1996	57,935,959	734,338	535,775	198,563	12.7	9.2	3.4	−0.3	1.733	4.8	74.1	82.0
1997	58,116,018	726,768	530,319	196,449	12.5	9.1	3.4	−0.3	1.726	4.7	74.5	82.3
1998	58,298,962	738,080	534,005	204,075	12.6	9.1	3.5	−0.1	1.764	4.6	74.7	82.4
1999	58,496,613	744,791	537,661	207,130	12.7	9.2	3.5	2.7	1.791	4.3	74.9	82.5
2000	58,858,198	774,782	530,864	243,918	13.1	9.0	4.1	2.8	1.874	4.4	75.2	82.8
2001	59,266,572	770,945	531,073	239,872	13.0	8.9	4.0	3.1	1.877	4.5	75.4	82.9
2002	59,685,899	761,630	535,144	226,486	12.7	8.9	3.8	3.2	1.864	4.1	75.7	83.0
2003	60,101,841	761,464	552,339	209,125	12.6	9.2	3.5	3.2	1.874	4.0	75.8	82.9
2004	60,505,421	767,816	509,429	258,387	12.6	8.4	4.3	3.3	1.898	3.9	76.7	83.8
2005	60,963,264	774,355	527,533	246,822	12.7	8.6	4.0	3.2	1.920	3.6	76.7	83.8
2006	61,399,733	796,896	516,416	280,480	12.9	8.4	4.6	1.8	1.980	3.6	77.1	84.2
2007	61,795,238	785,985	521,016	264,969	12.7	8.4	4.3	1.2	1.959	3.6	77.4	84.4
2008	62,134,866	796,044	532,131	263,913	12.8	8.5	4.2	1.1	1.990	3.6	77.6	84.3
2009	62,465,709	793,420	538,166	255,254	12.7	8.6	4.2	0.6	1.989	3.7	77.7	84.4
2010	62,765,235	802,224	540,469	261,755	12.8	8.6	4.2	0.7	2.016	3.6	78.0	84.6
2011	63,070,344	792,996	534,795	258,201	12.5	8.5	4.1	0.7	1.996	3.5	78.4	85.0
2012	63,375,971	790,290	559,227	231,063	12.4	8.8	3.6	1.5	1.992	3.5	78.5	84.8
2013	63,697,865	781,621	558,408	223,213	12.3	8.8	3.5	1.7	1.973	3.6	78.7	85.0
2014	64,027,958	781,167	547,003	234,164	12.2	8.5	3.6	0.7	1.974	3.5	79.2	85.4
2015	64,300,821	760,421	581,770	178,651	11.8	9.0	2.8	−0.2	1.925	3.7	79.0	85.1
2016	64,468,792	744,697	581,073	163,624	11.5	9.0	2.5	0.1	1.891	3.7	79.3	85.3
2017	64,639,133	730,242	593,606	136,636	11.3	9.2	2.1	1.1	1.858	3.9	79.5	85.3
2018	64,844,037	719,737	596,552	123,185	11.1	9.2	1.9	2.0	1.836	3.8	79.5	85.4
2019	65,096,768	714,029	599,408	114,621	11.0	9.2	1.8	0.9	1.827	3.8	79.7	85.6
2020	65,269,154	696,664	654,599	42,065	10.7	10.0	0.6	1.9	1.782	3.0	79.1	85.1
2021	65,505,213	701,819	644,201	57,618	10.7	9.8	0.9	4.3	1.793	3.7	79.2	85.2
2022	65,846,255	686,654	658,434	28,130	10.4	9.9	0.5	2.6	1.757	3.9	79.3	85.1
2023	66,165,815	639,533	623,959	15,574	9.7	9.5	0.2	2.4	1.639		80.0	85.6
2024	66,379,851	626,776	627,513	–737	9.5	9.5	–0.0	2.4	1.58		80.2	85.8
2025	66,578,547	610,185	631,145	–20,960	9.2	9.5	–0.3	3.3	1.534(e)		80.3	85.9
2026	66,792,845	603,200(e)										

For the purpose of compatibility, all data refers to Metropolitan France.

As of 2025, 421,871 (65.5%) newborn babies had both parents born in France, 15.1% had one foreign-born parent, and 19.4% had two foreign-born parents. In the same year, 461,422 (71.7%) newborn babies had both parents with French citizenship, 14.7% had one French and one foreign parent, and 13.7% had both parents with foreign citizenship.

=== Current vital statistics for Metropolitan France ===
Period	Live births	Deaths	Natural increase
January—September 2025	458,276	468,973	−10,697
January—September 2026	453,055	471,944	−18,939
Difference	▼ –5,221 (−1.14%)	▲ +3,021 (+0.64%)	▼ −8,242

View source data.

=== Total fertility rates by region ===
2025
Regions	TFR
Ile-de-France	1.63
Provence-Alpes-Côte d'Azur	1.61
Centre-Val de Loire	1.61
Pays de la Loire	1.59
Hauts-de-France	1.58
Normandy	1.56
Metropolitan France	1.53
Auvergne-Rhône-Alpes	1.53
Brittany	1.51
Bourgogne-Franche-Comté	1.50
(Occitania (administrative region)) Occitania	1.43
Grand Est	1.41
Nouvelle-Aquitaine	1.40
Corsica	1.12

==== Total fertility rate by department ====
2025
Departments	TFR
Ain	1.55
Aisne	1.71
Allier	1.58
Alpes-de-Haute-Provence	1.63
Hautes-Alpes	1.55
Alpes-Maritimes	1.54
Ardèche	1.59
Ardennes	1.53
Ariège	1.52
Aube	1.58
Aude	1.45
Aveyron	1.52
Bouches-du-Rhône	1.66
Calvados	1.44
Cantal	1.47
Charente	1.52
Charente-Maritime	1.40
Cher	1.62
Corrèze	1.53
Corse-du-Sud	1.13
Haute-Corse	1.13
Côte-d'Or	1.28
Côtes-d'Armor	1.57
Creuse	1.53
Dordogne	1.47
Doubs	1.52
Drôme	1.62
Eure	1.69
Eure-et-Loir	1.74
Finistère	1.47
Gard	1.59
Haute-Garonne	1.34
Gers	1.46
Gironde	1.35
Hérault	1.39
Ille-et-Vilaine	1.48
Indre	1.55
Indre-et-Loire	1.46
Isère	1.53
Jura	1.61
Landes	1.41
Loir-et-Cher	1.63
Loire	1.64
Haute-Loire	1.57
Loire-Atlantique	1.55
Loiret	1.69
Lot	1.50
Lot-et-Garonne	1.49
Lozère	1.44
Maine-et-Loire	1.62
Manche	1.52
Marne	1.54
Haute-Marne	1.67
Mayenne	1.76
Meurthe-et-Moselle	1.26
Meuse	1.42
Morbihan	1.59
Moselle	1.36
Nièvre	1.49
Nord	1.53
Oise	1.66
Orne	1.80
Pas-de-Calais	1.63
Puy-de-Dôme	1.43
Pyrénées-Atlantiques	1.36
Hautes-Pyrénées	1.45
Pyrénées-Orientales	1.54
Bas-Rhin	1.33
Haut-Rhin	1.54
Rhône	1.54
Haute-Saône	1.60
Saône-et-Loire	1.58
Sarthe	1.71
Savoie	1.46
Haute-Savoie	1.56
Paris	1.26
Seine-Maritime	1.56
Seine-et-Marne	1.68
Yvelines	1.78
Deux-Sèvres	1.57
Somme	1.52
Tarn	1.51
Tarn-et-Garonne	1.69
Var	1.56
Vaucluse	1.72
Vendée	1.49
Vienne	1.39
Haute-Vienne	1.41
Vosges	1.50
Yonne	1.71
Territoire de Belfort	1.55
Essonne	1.80
Hauts-de-Seine	1.55
Seine-Saint-Denis	1.92
Val-de-Marne	1.63
Val-d'Oise	1.94
Metropolitan France	1.53
Guadeloupe	1.65
Martinique	1.56
Guyane	3.04
La Réunion	2.14
Mayotte	3.48
France	1.56

=== Structure of the population ===
Population by Sex and Age Group (Census 01.I.2015):

Age group	Male	Female	Total	%
Total	31 138 550	33 162 271	64 300 821	100
0–4	1 932 140	1 847 172	3 779 312	5.88
5–9	2 031 848	1 942 222	3 974 070	6.18
10–14	2 024 518	1 934 267	3 958 786	6.16
15–19	1 996 718	1 892 357	3 889 075	6.08
20–24	1 877 169	1 839 475	3 716 644	5.78
25–29	1 882 618	1 933 606	3 816 224	5.93
30–34	1 960 633	2 030 784	3 991 417	6.21
35–39	1 973 599	2 014 489	3 988 088	6.20
40–44	2 155 883	2 185 588	4 341 471	6.75
45–49	2 155 308	2 206 495	4 361 803	6.78
50–54	2 111 783	2 195 431	4 307 213	6.70
55–59	1 992 506	2 120 744	4 113 250	6.40
60–64	1 912 839	2 077 537	3 990 376	6.21
65–69	1 713 389	1 892 099	3 605 489	5.61
70–74	1 138 687	1 319 739	2 458 426	3.82
75–79	938 443	1 228 941	2 167 384	3.37
80–84	731 105	1 133 939	1 865 044	2.90
85–89	420 854	829 023	1 249 877	1.94
90–94	161 109	427 905	589 014	0.92
95–99	23 412	91 245	114 657	0.18
100+	3 989	19 212	23 202	0.04
Age group	Male	Female	Total	Percent
0–14	5 988 506	5 723 661	11 712 167	18.21
15–64	20 019 056	20 496 507	40 515 563	63.01
65+	5 130 988	6 942 103	12 073 091	18.78

Population Estimates by Sex and Age Group (01.I.2021) (Excluding diplomatic personnel outside the country and including members of alien armed forces not living in military camps and foreign diplomatic personnel not living in embassies or consulates.):

Age group	Male	Female	Total	%
Total	31 679 652	33 767 802	65 447 454	100
0–4	1 760 893	1 687 156	3 448 049	5.27
5–9	1 987 773	1 899 786	3 887 559	5.94
10–14	2 094 546	1 994 602	4 089 148	6.25
15–19	2 067 605	1 953 663	4 021 268	6.14
20–24	1 920 746	1 841 850	3 762 596	5.75
25–29	1 790 516	1 806 271	3 596 787	5.50
30–34	1 924 391	2 013 946	3 938 337	6.02
35–39	1 993 274	2 096 326	4 089 600	6.25
40–44	1 982 775	2 048 758	4 031 533	6.16
45–49	2 140 131	2 174 545	4 314 676	6.59
50–54	2 117 292	2 178 427	4 295 719	6.56
55–59	2 074 814	2 187 145	4 261 959	6.51
60–64	1 918 243	2 101 118	4 019 361	6.14
65–69	1 772 195	2 011 386	3 783 581	5.78
70–74	1 673 663	1 941 869	3 615 532	5.52
75–79	992 857	1 236 666	2 229 523	3.41
80–84	750 113	1 068 460	1 818 573	2.78
85–89	478 291	865 782	1 344 073	2.05
90–94	193 641	481 583	675 224	1.03
95–99	42 044	157 385	199 429	0.30
100–104	3 371	19 251	22 622	0.03
105–109	384	1 575	1 959	<0.01
110+	94	252	346	<0.01
Age group	Male	Female	Total	Percent
0–14	5 843 212	5 581 544	11 424 756	17.46
15–64	19 929 787	20 402 049	40 331 836	61.62
65+	5 906 653	7 784 209	13 690 862	20.92

=== Births in mainland France by place of birth of parents ===
INSEE counts individuals born alive in mainland France according to the detailed place of birth of the parents:

Country of birth of parent	Number of births by country of father (% of total births)															Number of births by country of mother (% of total births)														
Country of birth of parent	(2010)	(2011)	(2012)	(2013)	(2014)	(2015)	(2016)	(2017)	(2018)	(2019)	(2020)	(2021)	(2022)	(2023)	(2024)	(2010)	(2011)	(2012)	(2013)	(2014)	(2015)	(2016)	(2017)	(2018)	(2019)	(2020)	(2021)	(2022)	(2023)	(2024)
Total	802 224 (100)	792 996 (100)	790 290 (100)	781 621 (100)	781 167 (100)	760 421 (100)	744 697 (100)	730 242 (100)	719 737 (100)	714 029 (100)	696 664 (100)	701 819 (100)	686 564 (100)	639 533 (100)	626 776 (100)	802 224 (100)	792 996 (100)	790 290 (100)	781 621 (100)	781 167 (100)	760 421 (100)	744 697 (100)	730 242 (100)	719 737 (100)	714 029 (100)	696 664 (100)	701 819 (100)	686 564 (100)	639 533 (100)	626 776 (100)
France	640 598 (79.85)	632 207 (79.72)	627 365 (79.38)	613 424 (78.48)	608 646 (77.91)	588 148 (77.35)	571 275 (76.71)	555 974 (76.14)	544 720 (75.68)	536 243 (75.10)	524 718 (75.32)	534 294 (76.13)	514 002 (74.87)	470 436 (73.56)	457 039 (72.92)	655 627 (81.73)	644 323 (81.25)	638 518 (80.80)	624 148 (79.85)	617 739 (79.08)	596 823 (78.49)	579 072 (77.76)	563 785 (77.21)	552 501 (77.21)	543 297 (76.09)	532 658 (76.46)	542 566 (77.31)	523 979 (76.32)	479 607 (74.99)	465 735 (74.31)
Foreigners	161 626 (20.15)	160 789 (20.28)	162 925 (20.62)	168 197 (21.52)	172 521 (22.09)	172 273 (22.65)	173 422 (23.29)	174 268 (23.86)	175 017 (24.32)	177 786 (24.90)	171 946 (24.68)	167 525 (23.87)	172 562 (25.13)	169 097 (26.44)	169 737 (27.08)	146 597 (18.27)	148 673 (18.75)	151 772 (19.20)	157 473 (20.15)	163 428 (20.92)	163 598 (21.51)	165 625 (22.24)	166 457 (22.79)	167 236 (23.24)	170 732 (23.91)	164 006 (23.54)	159 253 (22.69)	162 585 (23.68)	159 926 (25.01)	161 041 (25.69)
Foreigners detail :
Europe	22 010 (2.74)	24 795 (3.13)	25 489 (3.23)	26 516 (3.39)	27 545 (3.53)	28 264 (3.72)	28 673 (3.85)	28 794 (3.94)	28 699 (3.99)	28 680 (4.02)	27 904 (4.01)	28 101 (4.00)	27 425 (3.99)	25 779 (4.03)	24 629 (3.93)	25 331 (3.16)	26 803 (3.38)	27 630 (3.50)	28 951 (3.70)	30 612 (3.92)	31 073 (4.09)	31 908 (4.28)	32 092 (4.39)	32 001 (4.45)	31 792 (4.45)	30 938 (4.44)	31 193 (4.44)	30 388 (4.43)	28 769 (4.50)	27 232 (4.34)
Portugal	5 954 (0.74)	6 299 (0.79)	6 358 (0.80)	6 465 (0.83)	6 615 (0.85)	6 514 (0.86)	6 408 (0.86)	6 100 (0.84)	5 820 (0.81)	5 679 (0.80)	5 303 (0.76)	5 090 (0.73)	4 800 (0.70)	4 372 (0.68)	3 967 (0.63)	4 349 (0.54)	4 430 (0.56)	4 405 (0.56)	4 593 (0.59)	4 903 (0.63)	4 964 (0.65)	4 967 (0.67)	4 657 (0.64)	4 545 (0.63)	4 499 (0.63)	4 099 (0.59)	3 957 (0.56)	3 869 (0.56)	3 531 (0.55)	3 328 (0.53)
Romania	1 866 (0.23)	2 477 (0.31)	2 906 (0.37)	3 076 (0.39)	3 438 (0.44)	3 891 (0.51)	4 297 (0.58)	4 583 (0.63)	4 670 (0.65)	4 813 (0.67)	4 806 (0.69)	4 806 (0.68)	4 612 (0.67)	4 284 (0.67)	3 923 (0.63)	2 651 (0.33)	2 964 (0.37)	3 434 (0.43)	3 592 (0.46)	4 046 (0.52)	4 453 (0.59)	4 825 (0.65)	5 112 (0.70)	5 059 (0.70)	5 210 (0.73)	5 096 (0.73)	5 127 (0.73)	4 872 (0.71)	4 511 (0.71)	4 106 (0.66)
Italy	1 458 (0.18)	1 584 (0.20)	1 550 (0.20)	1 521 (0.19)	1 628 (0.21)	1 753 (0.23)	1 788 (0.24)	1 752 (0.24)	1 770 (0.25)	1 867 (0.26)	1 857 (0.27)	1 992 (0.28)	1 894 (0.28)	1 893 (0.30)	1 868 (0.30)	1 231 (0.15)	1 283 (0.16)	1 278 (0.16)	1 320 (0.17)	1 440 (0.18)	1 520 (0.20)	1 652 (0.22)	1 702 (0.23)	1 817 (0.25)	1 830 (0.26)	1 993 (0.29)	2 123 (0.30)	2 069 (0.30)	2 037 (0.32)	2 093 (0.33)
Serbia	1 489 (0.19)	1 723 (0.22)	1 788 (0.23)	1 908 (0.24)	1 896 (0.24)	1 882 (0.25)	1 815 (0.24)	1 888 (0.26)	1 880 (0.26)	1 822 (0.26)	1 688 (0.24)	1 670 (0.24)	1 558 (0.23)	1 373 (0.21)	1 373 (0.22)	1 535 (0.19)	1 656 (0.21)	1 660 (0.21)	1 791 (0.23)	1 753 (0.22)	1 795 (0.24)	1 715 (0.23)	1 809 (0.25)	1 771 (0.25)	1 697 (0.24)	1 607 (0.23)	1 518 (0.22)	1 431 (0.21)	1 251 (0.20)	1 239 (0.20)
Belgium	1 828 (0.23)	1 902 (0.24)	1 947 (0.25)	1 888 (0.24)	1 846 (0.24)	1 743 (0.23)	1 659 (0.22)	1 556 (0.21)	1 531 (0.21)	1 595 (0.22)	1 538 (0.22)	1 602 (0.23)	1 555 (0.23)	1 443 (0.23)	1 416 (0.23)	1 919 (0.24)	1 904 (0.24)	1 824 (0.23)	1 787 (0.23)	1 714 (0.22)	1 591 (0.21)	1 596 (0.21)	1 544 (0.21)	1 502 (0.21)	1 498 (0.21)	1 526 (0.22)	1 603 (0.23)	1 499 (0.22)	1 451 (0.23)	1 417 (0.23)
Russia	840 (0.10)	1 387 (0.17)	1 606 (0.20)	1 645 (0.21)	1 675 (0.21)	1 712 (0.23)	1 599 (0.21)	1 653 (0.23)	1 609 (0.22)	1 554 (0.22)	1 453 (0.21)	1 371 (0.20)	1 339 (0.20)	1 214 (0.19)	1 273 (0.20)	1 828 (0.23)	2 373 (0.30)	2 646 (0.33)	2 715 (0.35)	2 817 (0.36)	2 779 (0.37)	2 722 (0.37)	2 711 (0.37)	2 520 (0.35)	2 560 (0.36)	2 404 (0.35)	2 253 (0.32)	2 161 (0.31)	2 011 (0.31)	1 985 (0.32)
Germany	1 548 (0.19)	1 690 (0.21)	1 562 (0.20)	1 529 (0.20)	1 564 (0.20)	1 470 (0.19)	1 427 (0.19)	1 384 (0.19)	1 332 (0.19)	1 282 (0.18)	1 259 (0.18)	1 260 (0.18)	1 206 (0.18)	1 073 (0.17)	1 053 (0.17)	1 963 (0.24)	1 928 (0.24)	1 870 (0.24)	1 820 (0.23)	1 881 (0.24)	1 730 (0.23)	1 805 (0.24)	1 666 (0.23)	1 700 (0.24)	1 640 (0.23)	1 535 (0.22)	1 566 (0.22)	1 365 (0.20)	1 322 (0.21)	1 187 (0.19)
Spain	912 (0.11)	1 046 (0.13)	1 059 (0.13)	1 070 (0.14)	1 181 (0.15)	1 312 (0.17)	1 344 (0.18)	1 197 (0.16)	1 233 (0.17)	1 193 (0.17)	1 276 (0.18)	1 162 (0.17)	1 142 (0.17)	1 084 (0.17)	1 009 (0.16)	1 129 (0.14)	1 191 (0.15)	1 177 (0.15)	1 366 (0.17)	1 471 (0.19)	1 598 (0.21)	1 639 (0.22)	1 527 (0.21)	1 630 (0.23)	1 548 (0.22)	1 575 (0.23)	1 681 (0.24)	1 542 (0.22)	1 498 (0.23)	1 471 (0.23)
United Kingdom	1 866 (0.23)	1 487 (0.19)	1 309 (0.17)	1 359 (0.17)	1 194 (0.15)	1 170 (0.15)	1 154 (0.15)	1 139 (0.16)	1 080 (0.15)	1 015 (0.14)	977 (0.14)	1 094 (0.16)	1 017 (0.15)	940 (0.15)	1 042 (0.17)	1 407 (0.18)	1 401 (0.18)	1 290 (0.16)	1 230 (0.16)	1 220 (0.16)	1 139 (0.15)	1 131 (0.15)	1 152 (0.16)	1 132 (0.16)	1 085 (0.15)	1 005 (0.14)	1 100 (0.16)	1 029 (0.15)	1 019 (0.16)	934 (0.15)
Bulgaria	283 (0.04)	359 (0.05)	418 (0.05)	449 (0.06)	512 (0.07)	541 (0.07)	625 (0.08)	637 (0.09)	695 (0.10)	714 (0.10)	756 (0.11)	682 (0.10)	677 (0.10)	653 (0.10)	612 (0.10)	525 (0.07)	537 (0.07)	634 (0.08)	718 (0.09)	769 (0.10)	797 (0.10)	870 (0.12)	851 (0.12)	911 (0.13)	901 (0.13)	948 (0.14)	877 (0.12)	863 (0.13)	803 (0.13)	746 (0.12)
Switzerland	662 (0.08)	683 (0.09)	655 (0.08)	663 (0.08)	661 (0.08)	674 (0.09)	721 (0.10)	633 (0.09)	637 (0.09)	630 (0.09)	643 (0.09)	700 (0.10)	621 (0.09)	588 (0.09)	560 (0.09)	750 (0.09)	679 (0.09)	747 (0.09)	742 (0.09)	712 (0.09)	732 (0.10)	708 (0.10)	680 (0.10)	734 (0.10)	741 (0.10)	713 (0.10)	718 (0.10)	679 (0.10)	589 (0.09)	607 (0.10)
Poland	1 026 (0.13)	1 026 (0.13)	1 070 (0.14)	1 088 (0.14)	1 115 (0.14)	1 135 (0.15)	1 072 (0.14)	1 054 (0.14)	991 (0.14)	869 (0.12)	759 (0.11)	705 (0.10)	590 (0.09)	473 (0.07)	472 (0.08)	1 941 (0.24)	1 905 (0.24)	1 934 (0.24)	1 940 (0.25)	2 038 (0.26)	1 981 (0.26)	1 847 (0.25)	1 829 (0.25)	1 682 (0.23)	1 462 (0.20)	1 398 (0.20)	1 309 (0.19)	1 025 (0.15)	932 (0.15)	822 (0.13)
Netherlands	389 (0.05)	346 (0.04)	320 (0.04)	343 (0.04)	320 (0.04)	314 (0.04)	267 (0.04)	267 (0.04)	261 (0.04)	235 (0.03)	264 (0.04)	280 (0.04)	285 (0.04)	282 (0.04)	295 (0.05)	408 (0.05)	425 (0.05)	381 (0.05)	399 (0.05)	353 (0.05)	353 (0.05)	339 (0.05)	381 (0.05)	337 (0.05)	304 (0.04)	330 (0.05)	328 (0.05)	348 (0.05)	333 (0.05)	290 (0.05)
Greece	98 (0.01)	70 (0.01)	72 (0.01)	119 (0.02)	121 (0.02)	110 (0.01)	127 (0.02)	100 (0.01)	105 (0.01)	127 (0.02)	115 (0.02)	119 (0.02)	116 (0.02)	126 (0.02)	119 (0.02)	102 (0.01)	105 (0.01)	123 (0.02)	138 (0.02)	159 (0.02)	142 (0.02)	179 (0.02)	149 (0.02)	159 (0.02)	160 (0.02)	152 (0.02)	188 (0.03)	163 (0.02)	176 (0.03)	170 (0.03)
Luxembourg	75 (0.01)	75 (0.01)	91 (0.01)	74 (0.01)	78 (0.01)	87 (0.01)	85 (0.01)	87 (0.01)	91 (0.01)	96 (0.01)	86 (0.01)	80 (0.01)	87 (0.01)	74 (0.01)	83 (0.01)	77 (0.01)	69 (0.01)	67 (0.01)	78 (0.01)	76 (0.01)	73 (0.01)	94 (0.01)	99 (0.01)	82 (0.01)	83 (0.01)	85 (0.01)	62 (0.01)	87 (0.01)	72 (0.01)	92 (0.01)
Ireland	139 (0.02)	131 (0.02)	131 (0.02)	107 (0.01)	105 (0.01)	110 (0.01)	105 (0.01)	94 (0.01)	91 (0.01)	105 (0.01)	100 (0.01)	103 (0.01)	84 (0.01)	89 (0.01)	85 (0.01)	159 (0.02)	153 (0.02)	121 (0.02)	143 (0.02)	138 (0.02)	108 (0.01)	96 (0.01)	93 (0.01)	101 (0.01)	88 (0.01)	72 (0.01)	97 (0.01)	90 (0.01)	98 (0.02)	96 (0.02)
Hungary	82 (0.01)	92 (0.01)	104 (0.01)	98 (0.01)	136 (0.02)	115 (0.02)	129 (0.02)	95 (0.01)	115 (0.02)	113 (0.02)	90 (0.01)	87 (0.01)	78 (0.01)	77 (0.01)	69 (0.01)	155 (0.02)	176 (0.02)	200 (0.03)	196 (0.03)	228 (0.03)	235 (0.03)	240 (0.03)	220 (0.03)	221 (0.03)	226 (0.03)	196 (0.03)	212 (0.03)	186 (0.03)	178 (0.03)	162 (0.03)
Sweden	90 (0.01)	77 (0.01)	66 (0.01)	65 (0.01)	71 (0.01)	80 (0.01)	66 (0.01)	44 (0.01)	59 (0.01)	44 (0.01)	59 (0.01)	55 (0.08)	59 (0.01)	67 (0.01)	58 (0.01)	182 (0.02)	169 (0.02)	136 (0.02)	159 (0.02)	161 (0.02)	125 (0.02)	150 (0.02)	120 (0.02)	118 (0.02)	110 (0.02)	106 (0.02)	108 (0.02)	104 (0.02)	94 (0.01)	93 (0.01)
Slovakia	46 (0.01)	59 (0.01)	60 (0.01)	59 (0.01)	70 (0.01)	64 (0.01)	82 (0.01)	56 (0.01)	70 (0.10)	77 (0.01)	66 (0.01)	57 (0.01)	58 (0.01)	65 (0.01)	44 (0.01)	151 (0.02)	152 (0.02)	165 (0.02)	180 (0.02)	187 (0.02)	172 (0.02)	172 (0.02)	169 (0.02)	154 (0.02)	163 (0.02)	134 (0.02)	145 (0.02)	133 (0.02)	119 (0.02)	127 (0.02)
Austria	63 (0.01)	64 (0.01)	58 (0.01)	63 (0.01)	65 (0.01)	58 (0.01)	41 (0.01)	45 (0.01)	58 (0.01)	58 (0.01)	47 (0.01)	47 (0.01)	39 (0.01)	58 (0.01)	35 (0.01)	93 (0.01)	83 (0.01)	97 (0.01)	85 (0.01)	106 (0.01)	87 (0.01)	89 (0.01)	91 (0.01)	71 (0.01)	82 (0.01)	69 (0.01)	64 (0.01)	71 (0.01)	79 (0.01)	65 (0.01)
Denmark	54 (0.01)	46 (0.01)	35 (0.00)	42 (0.01)	34 (0.00)	46 (0.01)	47 (0.01)	22 (0.00)	37 (0.01)	34 (0.00)	39 (0.01)	37 (0.01)	36 (0.01)	33 (0.01)	33 (0.01)	89 (0.01)	70 (0.01)	67 (0.01)	66 (0.01)	64 (0.01)	52 (0.01)	59 (0.01)	47 (0.01)	45 (0.01)	40 (0.01)	42 (0.01)	47 (0.01)	39 (0.01)	26 (0.00)	39 (0.01)
Czech Republic	50 (0.01)	58 (0.01)	68 (0.01)	58 (0.01)	54 (0.01)	72 (0.01)	60 (0.01)	53 (0.01)	46 (0.01)	42 (0.01)	55 (0.01)	44 (0.01)	35 (0.01)	38 (0.01)	48 (0.01)	161 (0.02)	155 (0.02)	165 (0.02)	160 (0.02)	185 (0.02)	161 (0.02)	173 (0.02)	150 (0.02)	158 (0.02)	171 (0.02)	156 (0.02)	143 (0.02)	126 (0.02)	119 (0.02)	86 (0.01)
Latvia	12 (0.00)	28 (0.00)	19 (0.00)	20 (0.00)	30 (0.00)	34 (0.00)	39 (0.01)	28 (0.00)	26 (0.00)	21 (0.00)	28 (0.00)	31 (0.00)	31 (0.00)	31 (0.00)	25 (0.00)	61 (0.01)	69 (0.01)	63 (0.01)	89 (0.01)	84 (0.01)	78 (0.01)	91 (0.01)	96 (0.01)	85 (0.01)	113 (0.02)	79 (0.01)	92 (0.01)	87 (0.01)	79 (0.01)	71 (0.01)
Lithuania	25 (0.00)	41 (0.01)	34 (0.00)	38 (0.00)	40 (0.01)	44 (0.01)	45 (0.01)	27 (0.00)	41 (0.01)	38 (0.01)	40 (0.01)	42 (0.01)	25 (0.00)	32 (0.01)	34 (0.01)	96 (0.01)	132 (0.02)	109 (0.01)	114 (0.01)	112 (0.01)	112 (0.01)	138 (0.02)	113 (0.02)	128 (0.02)	116 (0.02)	116 (0.02)	118 (0.02)	101 (0.01)	95 (0.01)	68 (0.01)
Finland	27 (0.00)	19 (0.00)	19 (0.00)	23 (0.00)	28 (0.00)	19 (0.00)	16 (0.00)	19 (0.00)	15 (0.00)	17 (0.00)	13 (0.00)	23 (0.00)	25 (0.00)	22 (0.00)	20 (0.00)	72 (0.01)	65 (0.01)	67 (0.01)	77 (0.01)	70 (0.01)	48 (0.01)	57 (0.01)	68 (0.01)	56 (0.01)	40 (0.01)	46 (0.01)	52 (0.01)	50 (0.01)	39 (0.01)	35 (0.01)
Norway	31 (0.00)	37 (0.00)	25 (0.00)	33 (0.00)	33 (0.00)	22 (0.00)	22 (0.00)	28 (0.00)	19 (0.00)	25 (0.00)	24 (0.00)	34 (0.00)	19 (0.00)	23 (0.00)	27 (0.00)	48 (0.01)	43 (0.01)	45 (0.01)	40 (0.01)	42 (0.01)	38 (0.00)	36 (0.00)	37 (0.01)	33 (0.00)	39 (0.01)	37 (0.01)	38 (0.01)	34 (0.00)	22 (0.00)	29 (0.00)
Czechoslovakia	36 (0.00)	37 (0.00)	33 (0.00)	30 (0.00)	43 (0.01)	26 (0.00)	25 (0.00)	34 (0.00)	21 (0.00)	19 (0.02)	18 (0.00)	19 (0.00)	14 (0.00)	7 (0.00)	6 (0.00)	83 (0.01)	65 (0.01)	77 (0.01)	88 (0.01)	90 (0.01)	81 (0.01)	80 (0.01)	73 (0.01)	82 (0.01)	56 (0.01)	40 (0.01)	44 (0.01)	27 (0.00)	26 (0.00)	22 (0.00)
Slovenia	7 (0.00)	7 (0.00)	11 (0.00)	13 (0.00)	13 (0.00)	19 (0.00)	19 (0.00)	3 (0.00)	10 (0.00)	12 (0.00)	12 (0.00)	9 (0.00)	11 (0.00)	7 (0.00)	12 (0.00)	25 (0.00)	31 (0.00)	16 (0.00)	30 (0.00)	20 (0.00)	30 (0.00)	25 (0.00)	18 (0.00)	34 (0.00)	24 (0.00)	25 (0.00)	17 (0.00)	24 (0.00)	17 (0.00)	22 (0.00)
Cyprus	12 (0.00)	9 (0.00)	6 (0.00)	11 (0.00)	5 (0.00)	11 (0.00)	3 (0.00)	8 (0.00)	3 (0.00)	7 (0.00)	10 (0.00)	13 (0.00)	10 (0.00)	11 (0.00)	6 (0.00)	13 (0.00)	10 (0.00)	5 (0.00)	10 (0.00)	10 (0.00)	14 (0.00)	13 (0.00)	12 (0.00)	17 (0.00)	18 (0.00)	15 (0.00)	14 (0.00)	13 (0.00)	13 (0.00)	11 (0.00)
Malta	10 (0.00)	7 (0.00)	4 (0.00)	7 (0.00)	6 (0.00)	0 (0.00)	7 (0.00)	3 (0.00)	3 (0.00)	1 (0.00)	1 (0.00)	1 (0.00)	5 (0.00)	1 (0.00)	1 (0.00)	6 (0.00)	2 (0.00)	2 (0.00)	3 (0.00)	8 (0.00)	4 (0.00)	2 (0.00)	5 (0.00)	3 (0.00)	4 (0.00)	6 (0.00)	3 (0.00)	4 (0.00)	0	4 (0.00)
Estonia	9 (0.00)	9 (0.00)	3 (0.00)	11 (0.00)	7 (0.00)	7 (0.00)	10 (0.00)	13 (0.00)	11 (0.00)	6 (0.00)	7 (0.00)	12 (0.00)	4 (0.00)	10 (0.00)	7 (0.00)	34 (0.00)	34 (0.00)	35 (0.00)	40 (0.01)	52 (0.01)	45 (0.01)	28 (0.00)	56 (0.01)	39 (0.01)	39 (0.01)	29 (0.00)	37 (0.01)	39 (0.01)	32 (0.01)	21 (0.00)
Iceland	6 (0.00)	4 (0.00)	3 (0.00)	6 (0.00)	5 (0.00)	4 (0.00)	4 (0.00)	5 (0.00)	4 (0.00)	4 (0.00)	2 (0.00)	4 (0.00)	1 (0.00)	2 (0.00)	2 (0.00)	7 (0.00)	4 (0.00)	8 (0.00)	3 (0.00)	7 (0.00)	3 (0.00)	6 (0.00)	4 (0.00)	5 (0.00)	4 (0.00)	4 (0.00)	3 (0.00)	4 (0.00)	4 (0.00)	4 (0.00)
Other European countries	1 464 (0.18)	1 916 (0.24)	2 099 (0.27)	2 635 (0.34)	2 956 (0.38)	3 225 (0.42)	3 565 (0.48)	4 187 (0.57)	4 365 (0.61)	4 566 (0.64)	4 513 (0.65)	4 870 (0.69)	5 392 (0.79)	5 334 (0.83)	5 052 (0.81)	2 081 (0.26)	2 540 (0.32)	2 782 (0.35)	3 239 (0.41)	3 696 (0.47)	4 033 (0.53)	4 364 (0.59)	4 851 (0.66)	5 070 (0.70)	5 241 (0.73)	5 300 (0.76)	5 549 (0.79)	6 254 (0.91)	6 193 (0.97)	5 790 (0.92)
North Africa	67 073 (8.36)	70 630 (8.91)	71 120 (9.00)	73 032 (9.34)	74 228 (9.50)	73 261 (9.63)	72 808 (9.78)	71 886 (9.84)	70 654 (9.82)	69 845 (9.78)	66 174 (9.50)	62 218 (8.87)	62 811 (9.15)	59 962 (9.38)	59 168 (9.44)	58 124 (7.25)	58 947 (7.43)	59 694 (7.55)	62 286 (7.97)	64 088 (8.20)	64 022 (8.42)	64 081 (8.60)	63 763 (8.73)	62 963 (8.75)	62 900 (8.81)	58 767 (8.44)	54 920 (7.83)	54 906 (8.00)	52 846 (8.26)	52 554 (8.38)
Algeria	27 817 (3.47)	28 628 (3.61)	29 193 (3.69)	30 278 (3.87)	30 909 (3.96)	30 930 (4.07)	31 405 (4.22)	30 693 (4.20)	30 583 (4.25)	30 080 (4.21)	28 382 (4.07)	26 349 (3.75)	26 981 (3.93)	26 460 (4.14)	26 089 (4.16)	25 847 (3.22)	25 831 (3.26)	26 408 (3.34)	27 905 (3.57)	28 899 (3.70)	29 240 (3.85)	29 984 (4.03)	29 256 (4.01)	29 102 (4.04)	28 780 (4.03)	26 469 (3.80)	24 257 (3.46)	24 329 (3.54)	23 697 (3.71)	23 600 (3.77)
Morocco	27 689 (3.45)	29 678 (3.74)	29 237 (3.70)	29 356 (3.76)	29 661 (3.80)	28 610 (3.76)	27 779 (3.73)	27 617 (3.78)	26 441 (3.67)	25 881 (3.62)	24 300 (3.49)	22 718 (3.24)	22 214 (3.24)	20 305 (3.17)	19 508 (3.11)	25 074 (3.13)	25 563 (3.22)	25 367 (3.21)	25 908 (3.31)	26 283 (3.36)	25 719 (3.38)	24 891 (3.34)	25 304 (3.47)	24 372 (3.39)	24 016 (3.36)	22 547 (3.24)	20 959 (2.99)	20 564 (3.00)	19 161 (3.00)	18 625 (2.97)
Tunisia	10 607 (1.32)	11 466 (1.45)	11 812 (1.49)	12 404 (1.59)	12 640 (1.62)	12 697 (1.67)	12 565 (1.69)	12 521 (1.71)	12 513 (1.74)	12 765 (1.79)	12 398 (1.78)	12 074 (1.72)	12 604 (1.84)	12 073 (1.89)	12 490 (1.99)	6 737 (0.84)	7 138 (0.90)	7 517 (0.95)	7 980 (1.02)	8 424 (1.08)	8 561 (1.13)	8 692 (1.17)	8 655 (1.19)	8 867 (1.23)	9 504 (1.33)	9 167 (1.32)	9 106 (1.30)	9 492 (1.38)	9 322 (1.46)	9 664 (1.54)
Egypt	960 (0.12)	858 (0.11)	878 (0.11)	994 (0.13)	1 018 (0.13)	1 024 (0.13)	1 059 (0.14)	1 055 (0.14)	1 117 (0.16)	1 119 (0.16)	1 094 (0.16)	1 077 (0.15)	1 012 (0.15)	1 124 (0.18)	1 081 (0.17)	466 (0.06)	415 (0.05)	402 (0.05)	493 (0.06)	482 (0.06)	502 (0.07)	514 (0.07)	548 (0.08)	622 (0.09)	600 (0.08)	584 (0.08)	598 (0.09)	521 (0.08)	666 (0.10)	665 (0.11)
Black Africa/Non-French West Indies	29 814 (3.72)	38 285 (4.83)	39 277 (4.97)	41 445 (5.30)	43 086 (5.52)	44 093 (5.80)	45 106 (6.06)	47 280 (6.47)	49 869 (6.93)	53 268 (7.46)	53 092 (7.62)	53 240 (7.59)	57 496 (8.37)	58 238 (9.11)	59 843 (9.55)	31 598 (3.94)	34 523 (4.35)	35 367 (4.48)	37 365 (4.78)	39 043 (5.00)	39 591 (5.21)	40 600 (5.45)	42 316 (5.79)	44 453 (6.18)	47 923 (6.71)	47 420 (6.81)	46 965 (6.69)	50 682 (7.38)	51 594 (8.07)	53 347 (8.51)
Ivory Coast	2 209 (0.28)	3 446 (0.43)	3 658 (0.46)	4 093 (0.52)	4 360 (0.56)	4 470 (0.59)	4 601 (0.62)	5 082 (0.70)	5 715 (0.79)	6 832 (0.96)	6 915 (0.99)	7 150 (1.02)	8 388 (1.22)	8 638 (1.35)	9 208 (1.47)	2 483 (0.31)	3 257 (0.41)	3 535 (0.45)	3 829 (0.49)	4 077 (0.52)	4 144 (0.54)	4 308 (0.58)	4 817 (0.66)	5 445 (0.76)	6 403 (0.90)	6 295 (0.90)	6 500 (0.93)	7 647 (1.11)	7 821 (1.22)	8 333 (1.33)
Congo	3 908 (0.49)	6 367 (0.80)	6 361 (0.80)	6 752 (0.86)	6 872 (0.88)	6 823 (0.90)	7 022 (0.94)	7 317 (1.00)	7 444 (1.03)	7 299 (1.02)	7 050 (1.01)	6 697 (0.95)	6 867 (1.00)	7 007 (1.10)	7 010 (1.12)	4 000 (0.50)	5 612 (0.71)	5 772 (0.73)	6 119 (0.78)	6 372 (0.82)	6 210 (0.82)	6 384 (0.86)	6 560 (0.90)	6 603 (0.92)	6 519 (0.91)	6 153 (0.88)	5 929 (0.84)	6 003 (0.87)	6 183 (0.97)	6 346 (1.01)
Senegal	3 811 (0.48)	4 354 (0.55)	4 679 (0.59)	4 966 (0.64)	5 213 (0.67)	5 274 (0.69)	5 352 (0.72)	5 570 (0.76)	5 915 (0.82)	6 090 (0.85)	6 061 (0.87)	5 969 (0.85)	6 347 (0.92)	6 219 (0.97)	6 338 (1.01)	3 548 (0.44)	3 589 (0.45)	3 901 (0.49)	4 107 (0.53)	4 330 (0.55)	4 279 (0.56)	4 348 (0.58)	4 581 (0.63)	4 761 (0.66)	4 954 (0.69)	5 039 (0.72)	4 798 (0.68)	5 244 (0.76)	5 232 (0.82)	5 329 (0.85)
Guinea	1 356 (0.17)	1 895 (0.24)	2 045 (0.26)	2 214 (0.28)	2 390 (0.31)	2 526 (0.33)	2 593 (0.35)	2 990 (0.41)	3 179 (0.44)	4 412 (0.62)	4 543 (0.65)	4 950 (0.71)	5 659 (0.82)	6 332 (0.99)	7 334 (1.17)	1 499 (0.19)	1 756 (0.22)	1 858 (0.24)	1 970 (0.25)	2 136 (0.27)	2 251 (0.30)	2 279 (0.31)	2 595 (0.36)	2 792 (0.39)	3 852 (0.54)	3 936 (0.56)	4 203 (0.60)	4 814 (0.70)	5 460 (0.85)	6 399 (1.02)
Mali	3 875 (0.48)	4 407 (0.56)	4 337 (0.54)	4 504 (0.58)	4 476 (0.57)	4 492 (0.59)	4 429 (0.59)	4 732 (0.65)	4 799 (0.67)	4 755 (0.67)	4 786 (0.69)	4 847 (0.69)	5 073 (0.74)	4 876 (0.76)	5 006 (0.80)	3 129 (0.39)	3 061 (0.39)	2 959 (0.37)	3 143 (0.40)	3 079 (0.39)	3 074 (0.40)	3 263 (0.44)	3 272 (0.45)	3 412 (0.47)	3 413 (0.48)	3 391 (0.49)	3 379 (0.48)	3 541 (0.52)	3 524 (0.55)	3 628 (0.58)
Comoros	2 033 (0.25)	2 535 (0.32)	2 840 (0.36)	2 803 (0.36)	2 902 (0.37)	3 097 (0.41)	3 156 (0.42)	3 494 (0.48)	3 564 (0.50)	3 751 (0.53)	3 705 (0.53)	3 796 (0.54)	3 948 (0.58)	4 014 (0.63)	3 813 (0.61)	2 090 (0.26)	2 208 (0.28)	2 298 (0.29)	2 386 (0.31)	2 513 (0.32)	2 679 (0.35)	2 689 (0.36)	2 952 (0.40)	3 077 (0.43)	3 237 (0.45)	3 191 (0.46)	3 229 (0.46)	3 408 (0.50)	3 421 (0.53)	3 292 (0.53)
Cameroon	2 311 (0.29)	2 778 (0.35)	2 743 (0.35)	2 882 (0.37)	3 057 (0.39)	3 170 (0.42)	3 387 (0.45)	3 269 (0.45)	3 593 (0.50)	3 750 (0.53)	3 652 (0.52)	3 715 (0.53)	3 898 (0.57)	3 988 (0.62)	4 077 (0.65)	3 235 (0.40)	3 200 (0.40)	3 110 (0.39)	3 272 (0.42)	3 409 (0.44)	3 424 (0.45)	3 568 (0.48)	3 370 (0.46)	3 608 (0.50)	3 675 (0.51)	3 600 (0.52)	3 500 (0.50)	3 647 (0.53)	3 694 (0.58)	3 731 (0.60)
Nigeria	343 (0.04)	532 (0.07)	578 (0.07)	683 (0.09)	817 (0.10)	954 (0.13)	1 034 (0.14)	1 226 (0.17)	1 525 (0.21)	1 949 (0.27)	1 792 (0.26)	1 810 (0.26)	1 698 (0.25)	1 520 (0.24)	1 397 (0.22)	585 (0.07)	676 (0.09)	776 (0.10)	948 (0.12)	1 014 (0.13)	1 082 (0.14)	1 139 (0.15)	1 317 (0.18)	1 686 (0.23)	2 078 (0.29)	1 911 (0.27)	1 871 (0.27)	1 758 (0.26)	1 534 (0.24)	1 393 (0.22)
Haiti	1 408 (0.18)	1 795 (0.23)	1 747 (0.22)	1 695 (0.22)	1 770 (0.23)	1 714 (0.23)	1 780 (0.24)	1 809 (0.25)	1 716 (0.24)	1 679 (0.24)	1 655 (0.24)	1 639 (0.23)	1 611 (0.23)	1 515 (0.24)	1 541 (0.25)	1 706 (0.21)	1 718 (0.22)	1 650 (0.21)	1 636 (0.21)	1 641 (0.21)	1 632 (0.21)	1 663 (0.22)	1 666 (0.23)	1 617 (0.22)	1 605 (0.22)	1 522 (0.22)	1 522 (0.22)	1 504 (0.22)	1 436 (0.22)	1 399 (0.22)
Madagascar	1 414 (0.18)	1 530 (0.19)	1 463 (0.19)	1 552 (0.20)	1 463 (0.19)	1 426 (0.19)	1 356 (0.18)	1 296 (0.18)	1 431 (0.20)	1 352 (0.19)	1 408 (0.20)	1 382 (0.20)	1 311 (0.19)	1 249 (0.20)	1 265 (0.20)	2 185 (0.27)	2 142 (0.27)	2 024 (0.26)	2 101 (0.27)	2 081 (0.27)	2 031 (0.27)	1 960 (0.26)	1 937 (0.27)	1 938 (0.27)	2 041 (0.29)	2 057 (0.30)	1 962 (0.28)	1 920 (0.28)	1 796 (0.28)	1 827 (0.29)
Mauritania	793 (0.10)	999 (0.13)	965 (0.12)	1 053 (0.13)	1 061 (0.14)	1 080 (0.14)	1 101 (0.15)	1 092 (0.15)	1 107 (0.15)	1 135 (0.16)	1 137 (0.16)	1 096 (0.16)	1 237 (0.18)	1 254 (0.20)	1 157 (0.18)	524 (0.07)	583 (0.07)	593 (0.08)	622 (0.08)	663 (0.08)	670 (0.09)	644 (0.09)	694 (0.10)	716 (0.10)	723 (0.10)	752 (0.11)	716 (0.10)	806 (0.12)	871 (0.14)	836 (0.13)
Cape Verde	616 (0.08)	839 (0.11)	890 (0.11)	956 (0.12)	1 064 (0.14)	1 179 (0.16)	1 202 (0.16)	1 191 (0.16)	1 167 (0.16)	1 222 (0.17)	1 131 (0.16)	1 096 (0.16)	1 229 (0.18)	1 127 (0.18)	1 131 (0.18)	594 (0.07)	649 (0.08)	701 (0.09)	778 (0.10)	865 (0.11)	980 (0.13)	944 (0.13)	1 001 (0.14)	960 (0.13)	993 (0.14)	938 (0.13)	911 (0.13)	1 026 (0.15)	931 (0.15)	936 (0.15)
Benin	610 (0.08)	781 (0.10)	755 (0.10)	763 (0.10)	806 (0.10)	807 (0.11)	805 (0.11)	827 (0.11)	892 (0.12)	901 (0.13)	928 (0.13)	1 002 (0.14)	1 002 (0.15)	1 118 (0.17)	1 081 (0.17)	481 (0.06)	469 (0.06)	506 (0.06)	498 (0.06)	559 (0.07)	526 (0.07)	516 (0.07)	512 (0.07)	566 (0.08)	569 (0.08)	609 (0.09)	635 (0.09)	649 (0.09)	761 (0.12)	760 (0.12)
Gabon	478 (0.06)	620 (0.08)	601 (0.08)	658 (0.08)	684 (0.09)	688 (0.09)	764 (0.10)	733 (0.10)	806 (0.11)	818 (0.11)	853 (0.12)	853 (0.12)	903 (0.13)	878 (0.14)	974 (0.16)	713 (0.09)	743 (0.09)	696 (0.09)	721 (0.09)	795 (0.10)	819 (0.11)	921 (0.12)	981 (0.13)	975 (0.14)	1 123 (0.16)	1 055 (0.15)	1 070 (0.15)	1 119 (0.16)	1 131 (0.18)	1 182 (0.19)
Angola	825 (0.10)	1 017 (0.13)	1 045 (0.13)	1 063 (0.14)	1 106 (0.14)	1 066 (0.14)	1 040 (0.14)	1 110 (0.15)	1 014 (0.14)	1 051 (0.15)	979 (0.14)	891 (0.13)	896 (0.13)	916 (0.14)	973 (0.16)	758 (0.09)	718 (0.09)	748 (0.10)	747 (0.10)	785 (0.10)	817 (0.11)	764 (0.10)	860 (0.12)	851 (0.12)	902 (0.13)	866 (0.12)	774 (0.11)	774 (0.11)	817 (0.13)	879 (0.14)
Togo	708 (0.09)	783 (0.10)	799 (0.10)	761 (0.10)	797 (0.10)	798 (0.10)	745 (0.10)	722 (0.10)	754 (0.10)	751 (0.11)	732 (0.11)	716 (0.10)	790 (0.12)	779 (0.12)	787 (0.13)	625 (0.08)	604 (0.08)	597 (0.08)	627 (0.08)	625 (0.08)	560 (0.07)	568 (0.08)	555 (0.08)	504 (0.07)	498 (0.07)	529 (0.08)	521 (0.07)	560 (0.08)	526 (0.08)	581 (0.09)
Central African Republic	485 (0.06)	645 (0.08)	621 (0.08)	646 (0.08)	676 (0.09)	724 (0.10)	714 (0.10)	704 (0.10)	671 (0.09)	770 (0.11)	686 (0.10)	676 (0.10)	722 (0.11)	693 (0.11)	686 (0.11)	516 (0.06)	517 (0.07)	495 (0.06)	526 (0.07)	524 (0.07)	634 (0.08)	642 (0.09)	638 (0.09)	597 (0.08)	656 (0.09)	642 (0.09)	607 (0.09)	658 (0.10)	611 (0.10)	607 (0.10)
Chad	243 (0.03)	264 (0.03)	265 (0.03)	282 (0.04)	328 (0.04)	339 (0.04)	318 (0.04)	396 (0.05)	369 (0.05)	413 (0.06)	335 (0.05)	336 (0.05)	444 (0.06)	476 (0.07)	436 (0.07)	209 (0.03)	216 (0.03)	203 (0.03)	233 (0.03)	269 (0.03)	304 (0.04)	296 (0.04)	349 (0.05)	344 (0.05)	368 (0.05)	327 (0.05)	313 (0.04)	422 (0.06)	467 (0.07)	432 (0.07)
Mauritius	410 (0.05)	463 (0.06)	437 (0.06)	420 (0.05)	434 (0.06)	421 (0.06)	437 (0.06)	411 (0.06)	442 (0.06)	393 (0.06)	403 (0.06)	378 (0.05)	362 (0.05)	366 (0.06)	311 (0.05)	493 (0.06)	549 (0.07)	542 (0.07)	489 (0.06)	540 (0.07)	519 (0.07)	524 (0.07)	491 (0.07)	511 (0.07)	505 (0.07)	495 (0.07)	509 (0.07)	431 (0.06)	462 (0.07)	421 (0.07)
Niger	148 (0.02)	147 (0.02)	192 (0.02)	205 (0.03)	176 (0.02)	210 (0.03)	197 (0.03)	187 (0.03)	203 (0.03)	202 (0.03)	207 (0.03)	218 (0.03)	282 (0.04)	234 (0.04)	243 (0.04)	188 (0.02)	172 (0.02)	215 (0.03)	191 (0.02)	213 (0.03)	205 (0.03)	185 (0.02)	180 (0.02)	199 (0.03)	198 (0.03)	206 (0.03)	214 (0.03)	228 (0.03)	223 (0.03)	242 (0.04)
Other African countries	1 830 (0.23)	2 088 (0.26)	2 256 (0.29)	2 494 (0.32)	2 634 (0.34)	2 835 (0.37)	3 073 (0.41)	3 122 (0.43)	3 563 (0.50)	3 743 (0.52)	4 134 (0.59)	4 023 (0.57)	4 829 (0.70)	5 039 (0.79)	5 075 (0.81)	2 037 (0.25)	2 084 (0.26)	2 188 (0.28)	2 422 (0.31)	2 553 (0.33)	2 751 (0.36)	2 995 (0.40)	2 988 (0.41)	3 291 (0.46)	3 611 (0.51)	3 906 (0.56)	3 802 (0.54)	4 523 (0.66)	4 693 (0.73)	4 794 (0.76)
Asia	9 372 (1.17)	10 649 (1.34)	10 674 (1.37)	10 975 (1.39)	11 157 (1.43)	10 636 (1.40)	11 036 (1.48)	10 526 (1.44)	10 538 (1.46)	10 951 (1.53)	10 643 (1.53)	9 840 (1.40)	10 699 (1.56)	11 314 (1.77)	12 264 (1.96)	12 108 (1.51)	13 001 (1.64)	13 768 (1.74)	13 308 (1.70)	13 964 (1.79)	13 460 (1.77)	13 791 (1.85)	13 170 (1.80)	13 071 (1.82)	13 278 (1.86)	12 656 (1.82)	12 093 (1.72)	12 579 (1.83)	13 040 (2.04)	13 984 (2.23)
China	1 815 (0.23)	2 141 (0.27)	2 140 (0.27)	1 845 (0.24)	2 079 (0.27)	1 669 (0.22)	2 053 (0.28)	1 650 (0.23)	1 545 (0.21)	1 586 (0.22)	1 393 (0.20)	1 158 (0.16)	1 067 (0.16)	1 085 (0.17)	1 076 (0.17)	2 684 (0.33)	2 964 (0.37)	3 092 (0.39)	2 771 (0.35)	3 204 (0.41)	2 619 (0.34)	3 035 (0.41)	2 627 (0.36)	2 435 (0.34)	2 492 (0.35)	2 134 (0.31)	1 969 (0.28)	1 768 (0.26)	1 733 (0.27)	1 759 (0.28)
Vietnam	627 (0.08)	1 086 (0.14)	1 145 (0.14)	1 014 (0.13)	923 (0.12)	904 (0.12)	869 (0.12)	759 (0.10)	726 (0.10)	713 (0.10)	637 (0.09)	595 (0.08)	549 (0.08)	515 (0.08)	609 (0.10)	841 (0.10)	1 366 (0.17)	1 498 (0.19)	1 370 (0.18)	1 279 (0.16)	1 264 (0.17)	1 246 (0.17)	1 167 (0.16)	1 145 (0.16)	1 136 (0.16)	1 063 (0.15)	975 (0.14)	945 (0.14)	868 (0.14)	1 035 (0.17)
Cambodia	675 (0.08)	696 (0.09)	629 (0.08)	594 (0.08)	632 (0.08)	520 (0.07)	496 (0.07)	409 (0.06)	336 (0.05)	337 (0.05)	338 (0.05)	222 (0.03)	232 (0.03)	222 (0.03)	212 (0.03)	818 (0.10)	784 (0.10)	800 (0.10)	706 (0.09)	769 (0.10)	728 (0.10)	658 (0.09)	550 (0.08)	512 (0.07)	509 (0.07)	481 (0.07)	402 (0.06)	358 (0.05)	359 (0.06)	376 (0.06)
Laos	560 (0.07)	569 (0.07)	454 (0.06)	418 (0.05)	388 (0.05)	265 (0.04)	288 (0.04)	242 (0.03)	196 (0.03)	184 (0.03)	157 (0.02)	142 (0.02)	111 (0.02)	86 (0.01)	59 (0.01)	442 (0.06)	438 (0.06)	395 (0.05)	328 (0.04)	320 (0.04)	249 (0.03)	226 (0.03)	211 (0.03)	192 (0.03)	176 (0.02)	181 (0.03)	162 (0.02)	129 (0.02)	130 (0.02)	121 (0.02)
Japan	112 (0.01)	147 (0.02)	148 (0.02)	127 (0.02)	141 (0.02)	120 (0.02)	114 (0.02)	134 (0.02)	120 (0.02)	105 (0.01)	130 (0.02)	111 (0.02)	101 (0.01)	104 (0.02)	89 (0.01)	560 (0.07)	645 (0.08)	638 (0.08)	657 (0.08)	632 (0.08)	588 (0.08)	567 (0.07)	575 (0.08)	500 (0.07)	420 (0.06)	406 (0.06)	410 (0.06)	386 (0.06)	341 (0.05)	310 (0.05)
Sri Lanka	1 618 (0.20)	1 743 (0.22)	1 909 (0.24)	1 908 (0.24)	2 006 (0.26)	2 080 (0.27)	1 991 (0.27)	1 981 (0.27)	2 020 (0.28)	1 879 (0.26)	1 905 (0.27)	1 784 (0.25)	1 815 (0.26)	1 672 (0.26)	1 738 (0.28)	1 634 (0.20)	1 678 (0.21)	1 821 (0.23)	1 843 (0.24)	1 926 (0.25)	2 035 (0.27)	1 910 (0.26)	1 889 (0.26)	1 907 (0.26)	1 779 (0.25)	1 765 (0.25)	1 632 (0.23)	1 692 (0.25)	1 531 (0.24)	1 596 (0.25)
India	1 073 (0.13)	1 130 (0.14)	1 114 (0.14)	1 162 (0.15)	1 234 (0.16)	1 168 (0.15)	1 196 (0.16)	1 175 (0.16)	1 246 (0.17)	1 274 (0.18)	1 218 (0.17)	1 159 (0.17)	1 168 (0.17)	1 119 (0.17)	1 207 (0.19)	1 068 (0.13)	1 071 (0.14)	1 073 (0.14)	1 093 (0.14)	1 124 (0.14)	1 092 (0.14)	1 126 (0.15)	1 095 (0.15)	1 197 (0.17)	1 147 (0.16)	1 144 (0.16)	1 074 (0.15)	1 106 (0.16)	1 089 (0.17)	1 102 (0.18)
Bangladesh	245 (0.03)	308 (0.04)	338 (0.04)	380 (0.05)	376 (0,.05)	563 (0.07)	622 (0.08)	599 (0.08)	728 (0.10)	775 (0.11)	833 (0.12)	842 (0.12)	1 053 (0.15)	1 210 (0.19)	1 503 (0.24)	253 (0.03)	307 (0.04)	325 (0.04)	368 (0.05)	358 (0.05)	546 (0.07)	602 (0.08)	572 (0.08)	700 (0.10)	756 (0.11)	795 (0.11)	807 (0.11)	1 021 (0.15)	1 175 (0.18)	1 452 (0.23)
Pakistan	788 (0.10)	855 (0.11)	916 (0.12)	936 (0.12)	985 (0.13)	944 (0.12)	963 (0.13)	995 (0.14)	977 (0.14)	1 060 (0.15)	1 082 (0.16)	964 (0.14)	1 029 (0.15)	1 095 (0.17)	1 175 (0.19)	667 (0.08)	677 (0.09)	711 (0.09)	727 (0.09)	755 (0.10)	760 (0.10)	810 (0.11)	789 (0.11)	772 (0.11)	863 (0.12)	882 (0.13)	803 (0.11)	841 (0.12)	915 (0.14)	1 004 (0.16)
Other Asia	1 859 (0.23)	1 974 (0.25)	2 182 (0.28)	2 290 (0.29)	2 393 (0.31)	2 403 (0.32)	2 444 (0.33)	2 582 (0.35)	2 644 (0.37)	3 038 (0.43)	2 950 (0.42)	2 863 (0.41)	3 574 (0.52)	4 206 (0.66)	4 596 (0.73)	3 141 (0.39)	3 071 (0.39)	3 415 (0.43)	3 445 (0.44)	3 597 (0.46)	3 579 (0.47)	3 611 (0.48)	3 695 (0.51)	3 711 (0.52)	4 000 (0.56)	3 805 (0.55)	3 859 (0.55)	4 333 (0.63)	4 899 (0.77)	5 229 (0.83)
Middle East	12 657 (1.58)	12 955 (1.63)	12 620 (1.60)	12 775 (1.63)	12 566 (1.61)	12 043 (1.58)	11 805 (1.59)	11 584 (1.59)	10 949 (1.52)	10 512 (1.47)	9 728 (1.40)	9 374 (1.34)	9 346 (1.36)	9 069 (1.42)	9 137 (1.46)	10 713 (1.34)	10 387 (1.31)	10 294 (1.30)	10 226 (1.31)	10 257 (1.31)	9 809 (1.29)	9 564 (1.28)	9 437 (1.29)	8 806 (1.22)	8 542 (1.20)	7 947 (1.14)	7 483 (1.07)	7 593 (1.11)	7 313 (1.14)	7 476 (1.19)
Turkey	10 001 (1.25)	10 112 (1.28)	9 835 (1.24)	9 768 (1.25)	9 587 (1.23)	9 017 (1.19)	8 524 (1.14)	8 141 (1.11)	7 347 (1.02)	6 966 (0.98)	6 342 (0.91)	5 918 (0.84)	5 881 (0.86)	5 601 (0.88)	5 641 (0.90)	8 427 (1.05)	8 034 (1.01)	7 994 (1.01)	7 756 (0.99)	7 724 (0.99)	7 200 (0.95)	6 691 (0.90)	6 322 (0.87)	5 618 (0.78)	5 301 (0.74)	4 774 (0.69)	4 375 (0.62)	4 398 (0.64)	4 175 (0.65)	4 191 (0.67)
Syria	462 (0.06)	424 (0.05)	406 (0.05)	499 (0.06)	498 (0.06)	560 (0.07)	733 (0.10)	908 (0.12)	1 050 (0.15)	1 090 (0.15)	1 152 (0.17)	1 067 (0.15)	1 071 (0.16)	1 047 (0.16)	1 082 (0.17)	382 (0.05)	340 (0.04)	305 (0.04)	371 (0.05)	388 (0.05)	458 (0.06)	621 (0.08)	820 (0.11)	968 (0.13)	1 040 (0.15)	1 082 (0.16)	964 (0.14)	996 (0.15)	970 (0.15)	995 (0.16)
Lebanon	991 (0.12)	1 019 (0.13)	938 (0.12)	972 (0.12)	1 001 (0.13)	959 (0.13)	861 (0.12)	884 (0.12)	849 (0.12)	819 (0.11)	745 (0.11)	877 (0.12)	869 (0.13)	935 (0.15)	978 (0.16)	750 (0.09)	678 (0.09)	627 (0.08)	656 (0.08)	700 (0.09)	639 (0.08)	632 (0.08)	610 (0.08)	546 (0.08)	585 (0.08)	542 (0.08)	637 (0.09)	694 (0.10)	710 (0.11)	820 (0.13)
Armenia	473 (0.06)	710 (0.09)	779 (0.10)	824 (0.11)	780 (0.10)	786 (0.10)	872 (0.12)	850 (0.12)	861 (0.12)	783 (0.11)	737 (0.11)	751 (0.11)	792 (0.12)	766 (0.12)	782 (0.12)	566 (0.07)	750 (0.09)	819 (0.10)	878 (0.11)	856 (0.11)	866 (0.11)	915 (0.12)	953 (0.13)	938 (0.13)	857 (0.12)	817 (0.12)	811 (0.12)	835 (0.12)	805 (0.13)	826 (0.13)
Iraq	172 (0.02)	217 (0.03)	209 (0.03)	208 (0.03)	245 (0.03)	267 (0.04)	353 (0.05)	385 (0.05)	434 (0.06)	424 (0.06)	373 (0.05)	382 (0.05)	343 (0.05)	337 (0.05)	325 (0.05)	137 (0.02)	196 (0.02)	193 (0.02)	166 (0.02)	202 (0.03)	245 (0.03)	302 (0.04)	328 (0.04)	390 (0.05)	376 (0.05)	343 (0.05)	325 (0.05)	294 (0.04)	288 (0.05)	280 (0.04)
Iran	289 (0.04)	246 (0.03)	239 (0.03)	276 (0.04)	240 (0.03)	253 (0.03)	249 (0.03)	237 (0.03)	224 (0.03)	251 (0.04)	229 (0.03)	219 (0.03)	241 (0.04)	238 (0.04)	192 (0.03)	231 (0.03)	205 (0.03)	217 (0.03)	215 (0.03)	194 (0.02)	226 (0.03)	246 (0.03)	265 (0.04)	222 (0.03)	241 (0.03)	260 (0.04)	252 (0.04)	253 (0.04)	261 (0.04)	251 (0.04)
Israel	269 (0.03)	227 (0.03)	214 (0.03)	228 (0.03)	215 (0.03)	201 (0.03)	213 (0.03)	179 (0.02)	184 (0.03)	179 (0.03)	150 (0.02)	160 (0.02)	149 (0.02)	145 (0.02)	137 (0.02)	220 (0.03)	184 (0.02)	139 (0.02)	184 (0.02)	193 (0.02)	175 (0.02)	157 (0.02)	139 (0.02)	124 (0.02)	142 (0.02)	129 (0.02)	119 (0.02)	123 (0.02)	104 (0.02)	113 (0.02)
America/Oceania	3 164 (0.39)	3 475 (0.44)	3 444 (0.44)	3 755 (0.48)	3 939 (0.50)	3 976 (0.52)	3 994 (0.54)	4 198 (0.57)	4 308 (0.60)	4 530 (0.63)	4 405 (0.63)	4 752 (0.68)	4 785 (0.70)	4 735 (0.74)	4 696 (0.75)	4 969 (0.62)	5 012 (0.63)	5 019 (0.64)	5 337 (0.68)	5 476 (0.70)	5 643 (0.74)	5 681 (0.76)	5 679 (0.78)	5 942 (0.83)	6 297 (0.88)	6 277 (0.90)	6 597 (0.94)	6 436 (0.94)	6 361 (0.99)	6 448 (1.03)
Brazil	545 (0.07)	649 (0.08)	692 (0.09)	706 (0.09)	772 (0.10)	788 (0.10)	837 (0.11)	881 (0.12)	940 (0.13)	1 019 (0.14)	1 061 (0.15)	1 099 (0.16)	1 165 (0.17)	1 137 (0.18)	1 197 (0.19)	1 124 (0.14)	1 172 (0.15)	1 145 (0.14)	1 267 (0.16)	1 252 (0.16)	1 264 (0.17)	1 359 (0.18)	1 437 (0.20)	1 461 (0.20)	1 601 (0.22)	1 567 (0.22)	1 685 (0.24)	1 636 (0.24)	1 628 (0.25)	1 646 (0.26)
Colombia	288 (0.04)	329 (0.04)	334 (0.04)	399 (0.05)	419 (0.05)	478 (0.06)	423 (0.06)	468 (0.06)	496 (0.07)	580 (0.08)	543 (0.08)	631 (0.09)	627 (0.09)	594 (0.09)	615 (0.10)	538 (0.07)	521 (0.07)	547 (0.07)	572 (0.07)	603 (0.08)	689 (0.09)	664 (0.09)	680 (0.09)	671 (0.09)	827 (0.12)	781 (0.11)	843 (0.12)	825 (0.12)	873 (0.14)	890 (0.14)
United States	531 (0.07)	544 (0.07)	523 (0.07)	577 (0.07)	558 (0.07)	470 (0.06)	532 (0.07)	541 (0.07)	559 (0.08)	550 (0.08)	535 (0.08)	572 (0.08)	559 (0.08)	646 (0.10)	629 (0.10)	681 (0.08)	666 (0.08)	730 (0.09)	699 (0.09)	749 (0.10)	715 (0.09)	739 (0.10)	698 (0.10)	773 (0.11)	734 (0.10)	778 (0.11)	841 (0.12)	750 (0.11)	753 (0.12)	794 (0.13)
Mexico	164 (0.02)	178 (0.02)	195 (0.02)	193 (0.02)	229 (0.03)	274 (0.04)	214 (0.03)	251 (0.03)	262 (0.04)	231 (0.03)	219 (0.03)	263 (0.04)	263 (0.04)	258 (0.04)	248 (0.04)	347 (0.04)	343 (0.04)	393 (0.05)	355 (0.05)	406 (0.05)	441 (0.06)	447 (0.06)	416 (0.06)	435 (0.06)	438 (0.06)	473 (0.07)	476 (0.07)	474 (0.07)	450 (0.07)	481 (0.08)
Canada	316 (0.04)	328 (0.04)	277 (0.04)	282 (0.04)	319 (0.04)	288 (0.04)	257 (0.03)	243 (0.03)	236 (0.03)	190 (0.03)	247 (0.04)	246 (0.04)	237 (0.03)	217 (0.03)	199 (0.03)	406 (0.05)	359 (0.05)	353 (0.04)	375 (0.05)	338 (0.04)	344 (0.05)	353 (0.05)	298 (0.04)	299 (0.04)	289 (0.04)	304 (0.04)	324 (0.05)	319 (0.05)	310 (0.05)	291 (0.05)
Venezuela	108 (0.01)	96 (0.01)	131 (0.02)	140 (0.02)	139 (0.02)	181 (0.02)	175 (0.02)	176 (0.02)	186 (0.03)	223 (0.03)	177 (0.03)	178 (0.03)	226 (0.03)	185 (0.03)	194 (0.03)	174 (0.02)	176 (0.02)	179 (0.02)	205 (0.03)	192 (0.02)	224 (0.03)	231 (0.03)	235 (0.03)	264 (0.04)	289 (0.04)	271 (0.04)	270 (0.04)	291 (0.04)	284 (0.04)	291 (0.05)
Argentina	176 (0.02)	197 (0.02)	196 (0.02)	237 (0.03)	239 (0.03)	213 (0.03)	215 (0.03)	240 (0.03)	219 (0.03)	235 (0.03)	193 (0.03)	258 (0.04)	217 (0.03)	243 (0.04)	222 (0.04)	237 (0.03)	266 (0.03)	243 (0.03)	263 (0.03)	274 (0.04)	259 (0.03)	237 (0.03)	223 (0.03)	225 (0.03)	266 (0.04)	228 (0.03)	305 (0.04)	253 (0.04)	244 (0.04)	272 (0.04)
Peru	139 (0.02)	137 (0.02)	146 (0.02)	160 (0.02)	178 (0.02)	191 (0.03)	182 (0.02)	193 (0.03)	181 (0.03)	228 (0.03)	210 (0.03)	227 (0.03)	211 (0.03)	186 (0.03)	206 (0.03)	303 (0.04)	297 (0.04)	274 (0.03)	322 (0.04)	319 (0.04)	334 (0.04)	323 (0.04)	354 (0.05)	347 (0.05)	351 (0.05)	350 (0.05)	342 (0.05)	356 (0.05)	321 (0.05)	333 (0.05)
Chile	229 (0.03)	249 (0.03)	204 (0.03)	224 (0.03)	197 (0.03)	238 (0.03)	196 (0.03)	220 (0.03)	179 (0.02)	215 (0.03)	190 (0.03)	166 (0.02)	185 (0.03)	193 (0.03)	158 (0.03)	263 (0.03)	278 (0.04)	216 (0.03)	246 (0.03)	235 (0.03)	247 (0.03)	217 (0.03)	222 (0.03)	189 (0.03)	200 (0.03)	217 (0.03)	193 (0.03)	211 (0.03)	173 (0.03)	175 (0.03)
Australia	139 (0.02)	119 (0.02)	128 (0.02)	139 (0.02)	132 (0.02)	107 (0.01)	145 (0.02)	107 (0.01)	121 (0.02)	125 (0.02)	106 (0.02)	117 (0.02)	104 (0.02)	100 (0.02)	102 (0.02)	123 (0.02)	134 (0.02)	112 (0.01)	125 (0.02)	132 (0.02)	106 (0.01)	135 (0.02)	132 (0.02)	119 (0.02)	112 (0.02)	119 (0.02)	131 (0.02)	115 (0.02)	126 (0.02)	120 (0.02)
Other countries in America	465 (0.06)	566 (0.07)	539 (0.07)	604 (0.08)	662 (0.08)	649 (0.09)	718 (0.10)	778 (0.11)	832 (0.12)	834 (0.12)	821 (0.12)	898 (0.13)	905 (0.13)	894 (0.14)	833 (0.13)	712 (0.09)	751 (0.09)	771 (0.10)	835 (0.11)	904 (0.12)	946 (0.12)	908 (0.12)	912 (0.12)	1 089 (0.15)	1 125 (0.16)	1 117 (0.16)	1 130 (0.16)	1 149 (0.17)	1 140 (0.18)	1 104 (0.18)
Other countries in Oceania	64 (0.01)	83 (0.01)	79 (0.01)	94 (0.01)	95 (0.01)	99 (0.01)	100 (0.01)	100 (0.01)	97 (0.01)	100 (0.01)	103 (0.01)	97 (0.01)	86 (0.01)	82 (0.01)	93 (0.01)	61 (0.01)	49 (0.01)	56 (0.01)	73 (0.01)	60 (0.01)	74 (0.01)	68 (0.01)	72 (0.01)	70 (0.01)	65 (0.01)	72 (0.01)	57 (0.01)	57 (0.01)	59 (0.01)	51 (0.01)

Note: In 2010 some foreigners not declared country : father – 17,536; mother – 3,754

== Social issues ==
=== Marriage, divorce and family types ===
Average age of first marriage in Metropolitan France

Evolution of Marriage (red) and Civil Union (blue) in France (INSEE).

In 2020, there was a total of 154,581 marriages in France.

=== Communal housing and segregation ===
In recent years, communitarianism has become more prevalent in France. Some suburbs, such as La Courneuve, Sarcelles, and Toulouse-Le Mirail, are almost exclusively populated by people from sub-Saharan Africa and North Africa. These housing projects, built by architects such as Le Corbusier, Aillaud, and Candilis, have become communal ghettos.

== Employment and income ==
Unemployment, youth ages 15–24:

Total: 20.8%. Country comparison to the world: 61st.
Male: 21.4%.
Female: 20% (2018 est.).

== Ethnic groups ==
People in metropolitan France according to INSEE (2024)
Born in France with French nationality	85.1%
Born in France with foreign nationality	1.3%
Born abroad with French nationality	2.4%
Immigrants who acquired French nationality	3.8%
Immigrants with foreign nationality	7.5%

Note: people born outside of France (including the overseas departments) are referred to as immigrants regardless of their nationality (French or foreign). People without French nationality are referred to as foreigners regardless of their birthplace (France or abroad).

=== Data collection ===
The last national census based on religion occurred in 1872 at the start of the Third Republic. After that, except for the antisemitic census of the Vichy government, the state of France stopped collecting data on people's religion or ethnicity. In 1978, a law banned the collection of individual data concerning someone's race, religion, trade union or political and philosophical opinion. However, estimates have been made of the ethnic and racial demography of the country in the present.

Some organizations, such as the Representative Council of Black Associations of France (French: Conseil représentatif des associations noires de France, CRAN), have argued in favour of the introduction of data collection on minority groups but this has been resisted by other organizations and ruling politicians, often on the grounds that collecting such statistics goes against France's secular principles and harks back to Vichy-era identity documents. During the 2007 presidential election, however, Nicolas Sarkozy, polled on the issue, stated that he favoured the collection of data on ethnicity. Part of a parliamentary bill that would have permitted the collection of data for the purpose of measuring discrimination was rejected by the Conseil Constitutionnel in November 2007.

However, that law does not concern surveys and polls, which are free to ask those questions if they wish. The law also allows for an exception for public institutions such as the INED or the INSEE whose job it is to collect data on demographics, social trends and other related subjects, on condition that the collection of such data has been authorized by the National Commission for Computer-stocked data and Freedom (CNIL) and the National Council of Statistical Information (CNIS).

=== Statistics ===
The modern ethnic French are the descendants of Celts, Iberians, Ligurians, Italic peoples (including Romans), and Greeks in southern France, later mixed with large groups of Germanic peoples arriving at the end of the Roman Empire such as the Franks, Burgundians, Alamanni, and Goths, Moors and Saracens in the south, and Scandinavians, Vikings, who became, by mixing with the local population, the Normans and settled mostly in Normandy in the 9th century.

However, genome-wide analyses of both ancient and present-day DNA indicate that the genetic make-up of modern French populations is overwhelmingly derived from groups already living in Gaul during the Late Bronze and Iron Ages; post-Roman inputs from Germanic, Scandinavian, North-African or other peoples account for only minor fractions, invalidating the notion of any massive later admixture.

In 1960 there was approximately 500,000 'coloured' people present in France, constituting 1.2% of the population. In 2004, French conservative think-tank Institut Montaigne estimated that there were 51 million (85%) people of European ethnic origin, 6 million (10%) North African people, 2 million (3.5%) West African and Central African peoples and 1 million (1.5%) people of Asian origin in Metropolitan France, including all generations of immigrant descendants. TIME magazine in 2009 estimated that there was an estimated range of 4 to 7 million Arabs, 3 to 5 million Africans, 1.5 million Asians and around 600,000 Jewish people. Solis, a marketing company, estimated the numbers for ethnic minorities (immigrants and 2nd generation) in France in 2009 as 3.26 million Maghrebis (5.23%), 1.83 million black people (2.94%) (1.08 million West Africans and 757,000 French from French West Indies), and 250,000 Turkish (0.71%).

In 2015, Michèle Tribalat released a paper estimating population of ethnic minorities in France in 2011 to constitute 30% if ancestry retracted to 3 generations but with age limit of 60. 15% were of other European origin and another 15% rest.

Newly released figures from France's national statistical agency, which pulled census data from 2019–2020, revealed that nearly one-third of children aged four years and below are of non-European origin, a number which stands in sharp contrast with those recorded in older generations.

The data, published by the National Institute of Statistics and Economic Studies (INSEE), indicates that among those aged four and below living in ordinary housing (all residences excluding those for students, the elderly, and asylum seekers) in metropolitan France, 41.6% were born outside of France themselves, or are descendants of non-French parents or grandparents, with 29.6% having origins outside of Europe.

By comparison, a mere 7.6% of 60 to 64-year-olds and 3.1% of those over the age of 80 were of non-European origin over three generations, meaning they themselves, their parents, or grandparents were born outside of Europe.

Figures also revealed that 16.2% of all children aged four and below living in France are of Maghreb descent—a term used to describe the predominately Arab regions of northwest Africa, including Morocco, Libya, Algeria, Mauritania, and Tunisia. Out of every ten same-agegroup children in France, one is an immigrant or the child of immigrants from elsewhere in Europe, with 7.3% having originated from sub-Saharan Africa, 4% from Asia, and 1.7% from the rest of the world.

The Paris region is a magnet for immigrants, hosting one of the largest concentrations of immigrants in Europe. As of 2006, about 45% of people (6 million) living in the region were either immigrant (25%) or born to at least one immigrant parent (20%).

Of European ethnic groups not indigenous to France, the most numerous are people of Italian family origin and it is estimated that about 5 million citizens (8% of the population) are at least partly of Italian origin if their parentage is retraced over three generations. This is due to waves of Italian immigration, notably during the late 19th century and early 20th century. Other large European groups of non-native origin are Spaniards, Portuguese, Romanians, Poles, and Greeks. Also, due to more recent immigration, between five and six million people of Maghrebi origin and approximately 800,000 Turks inhabit France.

An influx of Maghrebi Jews immigrated to France in the 1950s and after the Algerian War due to the decline of the French empire. Subsequent waves of immigration followed the Six-Day War, when some Moroccan and Tunisian Jews settled in France. Hence, by 1968, Maghrebi Jews were about 500,000 and the majority in France. As the majority of these new immigrants were already culturally French they needed little time to adjust to French society. Black people come from both the French overseas territories (French Guiana, Guadeloupe, Martinique, Réunion, and former colony Haiti) and Sub-Saharan Africa (especially Côte d'Ivoire, Mali, and Senegal). France has the largest black population in Europe.

There is a substantial Romani population in France. There is approximately 400,000 Roma living in France.

== Immigration ==
Since the 19th century, France has continued being a country of immigration. During the Trente Glorieuses (1946–1975), the country's reconstruction and steady economic growth led to the labor-immigration of the 1960s, when many employers found manpower in villages located in Southern Europe and North Africa. In 2008, the French national institute of statistics INSEE estimated that 11.8 million foreign-born immigrants and their direct descendants (second generation) lived in France representing 19% of the country's population. About 5.5 million are of European origin and 4 million of Maghrebi origin.

Proportion of immigrant population of France 1921–2021 View source data.

Immigration to France exceeded 200,000 in recent years, as shown in table below.

Region	2004	2005	2006	2007	2008	2009	2010	2011	2012	% 2012
Europe	80 500	78 660	80 120	79 290	80 330	75 040	88 820	94 580	105 830	46 % (including from Eastern Europe)
Africa	70 200	66 110	62 340	62 140	63 470	66 480	65 610	66 280	68 640	30 % (including from Maghreb)
Asia	30 960	30 120	30 520	32 070	30 180	32 960	29 810	32 430	32 060	14 % (including from China)
America and Oceania	19 810	19 990	20 460	18 770	21 440	20 450	26 270	23 360	23 070	10%
All countries	201 470	194 880	193 440	192 270	195 420	194 930	210 510	216 650	229 600	100%

=== Before World War II ===
In the 20th century, France experienced a high rate of immigration from other countries. The immigration rate was particularly high during the 1920s and 1930s. France was the European country which suffered the most from World War I, with respect to the size of its population, losing 1.3 million young men out of a total population of 40 million. France was also at the time the European country with the lowest fertility rate, which meant that the country had a very hard time recovering from the heavy losses of the war. France had to open its doors to immigration, which was the only way to prevent population decline between the two world wars.

At the time, France was the only European country to permit mass immigration. The other major European powers, such as the UK or Germany, still had high fertility rates, so immigration was seen as unnecessary, and it was also undesirable to the vast majority of their populations. The majority of immigrants in the 1920s came from Italy and Poland, though from the 1930s, some also came from elsewhere in southern and eastern Europe, and the first wave of colonial French subjects from Africa and Asia. This mass immigration was ended and partially reversed by the economic problems of the 1930s. By the end of the Spanish Civil War, some half-million Spanish Republican refugees had crossed the border into France.

Local populations often opposed immigrant manpower, leading to occasional outbursts of violence. The most violent was a pogrom against Italian workers who worked in the salt evaporation ponds of Peccais, erupted in Aigues-Mortes in 1893, killing at least nine and injuring hundreds on the Italian side.

=== After World War II ===
After World War II, the French fertility rate rebounded considerably, as noted above, but economic growth in France was so high that new immigrants had to be brought into the country. Most immigrants were Portuguese as well as Arabs and Berbers from North Africa. The first wave arrived in the 1950s, but the major arrivals happened in the 1960s and 1970s. One million European pieds-noirs also migrated from Algeria in 1962 and the following years during the chaotic independence of Algeria. France has over three million French of Algerian descent, a small percentage of whom are third-or fourth-generation French.

French law facilitated the immigration of thousands of French settlers (colons in French language), ethnic or national French from former colonies of North and West Africa, India and Indochina, to mainland France. 1.6 million European pieds noirs settlers migrated from Algeria, Tunisia and Morocco. In the 1970s, over 30,000 French settlers left Cambodia during the Khmer Rouge regime as the Pol Pot government confiscated their farms and land properties. However, after the 1973 energy crisis, laws limiting immigration were passed. In addition, the country's birth rate dropped significantly during this time.

Between 1956 and 1967, about 235,000 Sephardic North African Jews from Algeria, Tunisia and Morocco also immigrated to France because of the decline of the French colonial empire and following the Six-Day War. Hence, by 1968, Sephardic North African Jews were the majority of the Jews in France. As the new immigrants were already culturally French, they needed little time to adjust to French society.

In the late 1970s, the end of high economic growth in France caused immigration policies to be considerably tightened, starting with laws by Charles Pasqua passed in 1986 and 1993. New immigrants were allowed only through the family reunion schemes (wives and children moving to France to live with husbands or fathers already living in France), or as asylum seekers. Illegal immigration thus developed as immigration policy became more rigid. In 2006, The French Ministry of the Interior estimated clandestine immigrants in France amounted to anywhere between 200,000 and 400,000 and expected between 80,000 and 100,000 people to enter the country illegally each year.

The Pasqua laws are a significant landmark in the shift in France's immigration policy through the course of the 20th century. They are a sign of the securitization aspect of immigration, giving more power to the police, allowing them to perform random identity checks and deport immigrants without legal papers. The rise in anti-immigration sentiments was reinforced by a series of terrorist bombs in Paris in 1986, linked to Muslim immigrants in France.

Tightening immigration laws, as well as notions of "zero immigration", reflected national views that arose within the discussion around immigrant family reunification and national identity. Institut français des relations internationales (IFRI) immigration expert, Christophe Bertossi, states that stigmatized as both a challenge to social cohesion and a "burden" for the French economy, family immigration is increasingly restricted and constructed as a racial issue. The "immigration choisie" policy strives consequently to select migrants according to their profile, skills and, still indirectly, origins.

Nonetheless, immigration rates in the 1980s and 1990s were much lower than in the 1960s and 1970s, especially compared to other European countries. The regions of emigrations also widened, with new immigrants now coming from sub-Saharan Africa and Asia. In the 1970s, a small but well-publicized wave of Chilean and Argentine political refugees from their countries' dictatorships found asylum in France.

Ethnic Vietnamese started to become a visible segment of society after the massive influx of refugees after the end of the Vietnam War in 1975. The expulsions of ethnic Chinese from Vietnam in the 1970s led to a wave of immigration and the settlement of the high-rise neighbourhood near the Porte d'Italie, where the Chinatown of Paris is located. Located in the 13th arrondissement, the area contains many ethnic Chinese inhabitants.

According to the distinguished French historian of immigration Gérard Noiriel, in 1989 one third of the population currently living in France was of "foreign" descent.

According to Michèle Tribalat, researcher at INED, there were, in 1999, approximately 14 million persons of foreign ancestry (about a quarter of the population), defined as either immigrants or people with at least one immigrant parent or grandparent. Half of them were of European ancestry (including 5.2 million from South Europe (Italy, Spain, Portugal and former Yugoslavia)). The rest were from Maghreb (3 million), Sub-Saharan Africa (680,000), Turkey (320,000) and other parts of the world (2.5 million). Immigrants from the Maghreb are commonly referred to as beur, a verlan slang term derived from the word arabe (French for Arab).

The large-scale immigration from Islamic countries has sparked controversy in France. Nevertherless, according to Justin Vaïsse, in spite of challenges and setbacks like the riots in November 2005, in Parisian suburbs, where many immigrants live secluded from society with very few capabilities to live in better conditions, the integration of Muslim immigrants is happening as part of a background evolution and recent studies confirmed the results of their assimilation, showing that "North Africans seem to be characterized by a high degree of cultural integration reflected in a relatively high propensity to exogamy" with rates ranging from 20% to 50%. According to Emmanuel Todd, the relatively high exogamy among French Algerians can be explained by the colonial link between France and Algeria. One illustration of this growing resentment and job insecurity can be drawn from related events, such as the 2005 riots, which ensued in former President Chirac declaring a state of emergency. Massive demonstrations to express frustration over unemployment took place in March 2009. The importance of integration was brought to the forefront of the political agenda in Sarkozy's 2007 presidential campaign. Upon being elected, he symbolically created the French Ministry of Immigration, Integration, National Identity and Codevelopment. Integration is one of the pillars of its political aims.

Migration background	Year											
Migration background	1986		1999		2008		2011		2011 (three gene.)		2021	
Migration background	Number	%	Number	%	Number	%	Number	%	Number	%	Number	%
White					55,545,000	89.39%	56,143,000	89.02%	55,774,000	88.43%	59,291,000	90.51%
French (without migrant background)	46,511,000	83.94%	48,659,000	83.18%	50,183,000	80.76%	50,980,000	80.83%	48,663,000	77.16%	51,192,000	78.15%
Italian			1,399,000	2.39%	1,237,000	1.99%	1,191,000	1.89%	1,931,000	3.06%	1,716,000	2.62%
Spanish			893,000	1.53%	877,000	1.41%	786,000	1.25%	1,240,000	1.97%	1,716,000	2.62%
Portuguese			1,054,000	1.80%	1,241,000	2.00%	1,205,000	1.91%	1,326,000	2.10%	1,224,000	1.87%
Belgian, Luxembourgers, Swiss							444,000	0.70%	667,000	1.06%		
Polish							364,000	0.58%	631,000	1.00%		
German							307,000	0.49%	437,000	0.69%		
Other European					2,007,000	3.23%	866,000	1.37%	879,000	1.39%	5,159,000	7.88%
Maghreb			2,730,000	4.67%	3,552,000	5.72%	3,811,000	6.04%	4,189,000	6.64%	4,483,000	6.84%
Algerian			1,357,000	2.32%	1,713,000	2.76%	1,907,000	3.02%	2,235,000	3.54%	2,005,000	3.06%
Moroccan			974,000	1.67%	1,314,000	2.11%	1,378,000	2.18%	1,365,000	2.16%	2,478,000	3.78%
Tunisian			399,000	0.68%	525,000	0.84%	526,000	0.83%	589,000	0.93%	2,478,000	3.78%
Black			679,000	1.16%	1,239,000	1.99%	1,291,000	2.05%	1,288,000	2.04%	2,160,000	3.30%
Sub-Saharan			679,000	1.16%	1,239,000	1.99%	1,291,000	2.05%	1,288,000	2.04%	2,160,000	3.30%
Caribbean												
Other Black												
Asian					1,347,000	2.17%	1,452,000	2.30%	1,444,000	2.29%	1,761,000	2.69%
Turkish			322,000	0.55%	459,000	0.74%	501,000	0.79%	501,000	0.79%	571,000	0.87%
Chinese							122,000	0.19%			162,000	0.25%
Other Asian					888,000	1.43%	829,000	1.31%	943,000	1.50%	1,028,000	1.57%
American / Oceanian					452,000	0.73%	372,000	0.59%	374,000	0.59%	749,000	1.14%
American / Oceanian					452,000	0.73%	372,000	0.59%	374,000	0.59%	749,000	1.14%
Total: Foreign background	8,900,000	16.06%	9,838,000	16.82%	11,952,000	19.24%	12,090,000	19.17%	14,407,000	22.84%	14,313,000	21.85%
Total	55,411,000	100%	58,497,000	100%	62,135,000	100%	63,070,000	100%	63,070,000	100%	65,505,000 [this column is not summed up correctly and thus the percentages are wrong as well]	100%

=== Today ===
In 2014, the National Institute of Statistics (INSEE is its acronym in French) published a study, according to which the numbers of Spanish, Portuguese and Italians in France had doubled between 2009 and 2012.

According to the French Institute, the increase due to the euro area crisis pushed up the number of Europeans in France. Statistics on Spanish immigrants in France show a growth of 107% between 2009 and 2012, from 5300 to 11,000 people.

Of 229,000 foreigners in France in 2012, nearly 8% were Portuguese, British 5%, Spanish 5%, Italians 4%, Germans 4%, Romanians 3%, Belgians 3% and Dutch 2%.

With the increase of Spanish, Portuguese and Italians in France, in 2012 46% of immigrants were European, while the percentage for Francophone African immigrants reached 30%, of which Moroccans were 7%, Algerians 7%, and Tunisians 3%. Meanwhile, 14% of all immigrants who settled in France in that year were from Asian countries: 3% from China, 2% from Turkey, 10% from America and Oceania, Americans and Brazilians accounting for 2% each.

As of 2008, the French national institute of statistics INSEE estimated that 11.8 million foreign-born immigrants and their direct descendants (limited to second-generation born in France) lived in France representing 19% of the country's population. More than 5.5 million are of European origin and about 4 million of Maghrebi origin (20% of Algerian origin and 15% of Moroccan or Tunisian origin). Immigrants aged 18 to 50 count for 2.7 million (10% of population age 18–50) and 5 million for all ages (8% of population). The second-generation immigrants aged 18 to 50 make up 3.1 million (12% of 18–50) and 6.5 million for all ages (11% of population). Without considering citizenship at birth, people not born in metropolitan France and their direct descendants made up 30% of the population aged 18–50 in metropolitan France as of 2008.

The region with the largest proportion of immigrants is the Île-de-France (Greater Paris), where 40% of immigrants live. Other important regions are Rhône-Alpes (Lyon) and Provence-Alpes-Côte d'Azur (Marseille). The most important individual countries of origin as of 2007 were Algeria (702,000), Morocco (645,000), Portugal (576,000), Italy (323,000), Spain (262,000) and Turkey (234,000). However, immigration from Asia (especially China), as well as from Francophone Sub-Saharan Africa (Senegal, Mali) is gaining in importance.

42% of the immigrants are from Africa (30% from Maghreb and 12% from Francophone Sub-Saharan Africa), 38% from Europe (mainly from Portugal, Italy and Spain), 14% from Asia and 5% from America and Oceania. Outside Europe and North Africa, the highest rate of immigration is from Vietnam, Cambodia and Senegal.

The following table shows immigrants and second-generation immigrants by origin as of 2008 according to a study published by Insee in 2012. Third-generation immigrants, illegal immigrants, as well as ethnic minorities like black people from the French overseas territories residing in metropolitan France (800,000), Roms (500,000) or people born in Maghreb with French citizenship at birth (1 million Maghrebi Jews, Harkis and pieds-noirs) and their descendants, who are French by birth and not considered as immigrants or immigrant descendants, are not taken into account.

Net migration rate 1.06 migrant(s)/1,000 population (2021 est.) Country comparison to the world: 61st

=== Net migration of Metropolitan France, 1946–present ===
France Population Data
Year	Population on January 1	Net migration
1946	40,125,230	+25,000
1947	40,448,254	+130,000
1948	40,910,569	+45,000
1949	41,313,195	+35,000
1950	41,647,258	+35,000
1951	42,010,088	+30,000
1952	42,300,981	+20,000
1953	42,618,354	+19,071
1954	42,885,138	+50,872
1955	43,227,872	+120,000
1956	43,627,467	+170,000
1957	44,058,683	+220,000
1958	44,563,043	+140,000
1959	45,014,662	+130,000
1960	45,464,797	+140,000
1961	45,903,656	+180,000
1962	46,422,000	+860,200
1963	47,573,406	+214,599
1964	48,059,029	+185,000
1965	48,561,800	+110,000
1966	48,953,792	+125,000
1967	49,373,537	+92,000
1968	49,723,072	+102,308
1969	50,107,735	+151,574
1970	50,528,219	+179,911
1971	51,016,234	+142,586
1972	51,485,953	+102,314
1973	51,915,873	+106,448
1974	52,320,725	+30,608
1975	52,600,000	+13,626
1976	52,798,338	+57,386
1977	53,019,005	+44,038
1978	53,271,566	+19,361
1979	53,481,073	+34,765
1980	53,731,387	+43,974
1981	54,028,630	+55,710
1982	54,335,000	+60,865
1983	54,649,984	+56,000
1984	54,894,854	+45,000
1985	55,157,303	+38,000
1986	55,411,238	+39,000
1987	55,681,780	+44,000
1988	55,966,142	+57,000
1989	56,269,810	+71,000
1990	56,577,000	+80,000
1991	56,840,661	+90,000
1992	57,110,533	+90,000
1993	57,369,161	+70,000
1994	57,565,008	+50,000
1995	57,752,535	+40,000
1996	57,935,959	+35,000
1997	58,116,018	+40,000
1998	58,298,962	+45,000
1999	58,496,613	+60,000
2000	58,858,198	+70,000
2001	59,266,572	+85,000
2002	59,685,899	+95,000
2003	60,101,841	+100,000
2004	60,505,421	+105,000
2005	60,963,264	+95,000
2006	61,399,733	+115,025
2007	61,795,238	+74,659
2008	62,134,866	+66,930
2009	62,465,709	+44,222
2010	62,765,235	+43,354
2011	63,070,344	+47,426
2012	63,375,971	+90,831
2013	63,697,865	+106,880
2014	64,027,958	+38,699
2015	64,300,821	+53,025
2016	64,468,792	+87,964
2017	64,639,133	+166,654
2018	64,844,037	+211,349
2019	65,096,768	+139,849
2020	65,269,154	+227,847
2021 (p)	65,505,213	+193,000
2022 (p)	65,721,831	+193,000
2023 (p)	65,925,961	+193,000
2024 (p)	66,142,961	+152,000

Immigrants by origin (2008) in thousands	Immigrants	Second generation	Total	%
Spain	257	620	877	7.3%
Italy	317	920	1 237	10.4%
Portugal	581	660	1 241	10.4%
Other countries from EU27	653	920	1 573	13.2%
Other European countries	224	210	434	3.6%
Europe Total	2 032	3 330	5 362	44.9%
Algeria	713	1 000	1 713	14.3%
Morocco	654	660	1 314	11.0%
Tunisia	235	290	525	4.4%
Maghreb Total	1 602	1 950	3 552	29.7%
Subsaharan Africa	669	570	1 239	10.4%
Turkey	239	220	459	3.8%
SouthEast Asia	163	160	323	2.7%
Other Asian countries	355	210	565	4.7%
America/Oceania	282	170	452	3.8%
Other Regions Total	1 708	1 330	3 038	25.4%
Total	5 342	6 610	11 952	100.00%

Place of Birth	Year	
Place of Birth	2011	
Place of Birth	Number	%
Place of birth in reporting country (France)	57,611,142	
Place of birth not in reporting country	7,321,237	
Other EU Member State	2,119,454	
Outside EU but within Europe	313,555	
Outside Europe/ Non-European	5,201,782	
Africa	3,596,143	
Asia	925,183	
North America	77,569	
Caribbean, South or Central America	279,529	
Oceania	9,803	
Total	64,933,400	100%

Immigrants by country of birth as of 2022:

Country	Population
Algeria	887,800
Morocco	836,400
(European Union) Portugal	573,000
Tunisia	328,200
(European Union) Italy	279,300
(European Union) Spain	243,100
Turkey	233,000
Comoros	148,300
United Kingdom	145,200
(European Union) Romania	139,100
Ivory Coast	134,100
Senegal	133,700
(European Union) Belgium	119,300
(European Union) Germany	113,900
China	105,400
Cameroon	98,800
Haiti	98,200
Mali	96,500
Congo	88,900
DR Congo	87,700
Mauritius	85,100
Madagascar	85,100
(European Union) Poland	79,900
Vietnam	78,600
Russia	75,200
Serbia	73,900
Guinea	69,600
Brazil	61,400
Switzerland	55,000
Sri Lanka	52,700
Cambodia	51,100
Lebanon	49,100
India	48,600
Afghanistan	44,700
Syria	41,700
United States	40,600
Albania	39,500
Colombia	38,100
Moldova	36,800
Armenia	36,000
(European Union) Netherlands	35,600
Egypt	31,900
Laos	31,900
(European Union) Bulgaria	31,700
Cape Verde	31,600
Pakistan	31,400
Ukraine	30,700
Togo	26,500
Iran	23,800
Suriname	21,500

In 2004, a total of 140,033 people immigrated to France. Of them, 90,250 were from Africa and 13,710 from Europe. In 2005, immigration levels fell slightly to 135,890. The European Union allows free movement between the member states. While the UK (along with Ireland and Sweden and non-EU members Norway and Switzerland) did not impose restrictions, France put in place controls to curb Eastern European migration.

As at 1 January 2006, INSEE estimated that there were 3.5 million foreigners living in metropolitan France. Two out of five foreigners are from Portugal, Algeria or Morocco. Thus, EU nationals immigrating to France account for 1.2 million people, and 1.1 million people are from the three Maghreb countries of Morocco, Algeria and Tunisia. Immigrants are concentrated in Île-de-France, Rhone-Alpes, Provence and Côte d'Azur regions, accounting for 60% of the total immigrant population. Furthermore, there appears to be a lower rate of immigrants arriving from the EU since 1975 as opposed to an increase in African immigrants.

In the first decade of the 21st century, the net migration rate was estimated to be 0.66 migrants per 1,000 population a year. This is a very low rate of immigration compared to other European countries, the United States or Canada. Since the beginning of the 1990s, France has been attempting to curb immigration, first with the Pasqua laws, followed by both right-wing and socialist-issued laws. This trend is also demonstrated in anti-immigrant sentiments among the public. For example, the Pew Research Center in Washington, D.C. conducted a public opinion poll in February 2004 among French nationals. This poll measured the extent of support for restricting immigration among French nationals, by age cohort. 24% of individuals 18 to 29 were restricting immigration, with 33% of individuals 30 to 49 and 53% for both 50 to 64 and 65 and over. Nearly nine years later, a January 2013 poll conducted in France by Ipsos found that 70% of respondents said that there were "too many immigrants in France".

The immigration rate is currently lower than in other European countries such as United Kingdom and Spain; however, some say it is unlikely that the policies in themselves account for such a change. Again, as in the 1920s and 1930s, France stands in contrast with the rest of Europe. Back in the 1920s and 1930s, when other European countries had a high fertility rate, France had a low fertility rate and opened its doors to immigration to avoid a population decline. Today, it is the rest of Europe that has very low fertility rates, and countries like Germany or Spain avoid population decline only through immigration. In France, however, the fertility rate is still fairly high for European standards. It is, in fact, the highest in Europe after Ireland (the EU) and Albania (perhaps higher than Ireland's) and so most population growth is due to natural increase, unlike in the other European countries.

The difference in immigration trends is also because the labour market in France is currently less dynamic than in other countries such as the UK, Ireland or Spain. One reason for this could be France's relatively high unemployment, which the country has struggled to reduce for the past two decades. There is also a parallel dynamic between immigration and unemployment. Immigrants tend to be subjected to higher rates of unemployment. In 2008, the immigrant unemployment rate in France was a startling 13%, twice as high as for the national population (6%). One can further analyse the trend in relation to education. In the ministry's 2010 report on professional inclusion for immigrants, 19.6% of immigrants without any education were unemployed while 16.1% of immigrants who had graduated high school were unemployed. Only 11.4% of immigrants with an undergraduate degree or higher were unemployed.

For example, according to the UK Office for National Statistics, between July 2001 and July 2004, the population of the UK increased by 721,500 inhabitants, of which 242,800 (34%) was due to natural increase, 478,500 (66%) to immigration. According to the INSEE, between January 2001 and January 2004 the population of Metropolitan France increased by 1,057,000 inhabitants of which 678,000 (64%) was due to natural increase, 379,500 (36%) from immigration.

The latest 2008 demographic statistics have been released, and France's birth and fertility rates have continued to rise. The fertility rate increased to 2.01 in 2012 and, for the first time, surpasses the fertility rate of the United States.

==== North and South Americans in France ====
Americans total more than 100,000 permanent residents in France, Canadians 11,931, followed by Latin Americans, a growing subgroup, the most numerous of which are Brazilians, at 44,622, followed by Colombians, at 40,000, Venezuelans, at 30,000, Peruvians, at 22,002, Argentineans, at 11,899, and Chileans, 15,782.

==== Europeans in France ====
In 2014 The National Institute of Statistics (INSEE, for its acronym in French) published a study, according to which has doubled the number of Spanish immigrants, Portuguese and Italians in France between 2009 and 2012.

According to the French Institute, the increase due to the euro area crisis pushed up the number of Europeans installed in France.

Statistics on Spanish immigrants in France show a growth of 107% between 2009 and 2012, i.e. in this period went from 5300 to 11,000 people.

Of the total of 229,000 foreigners in France in 2012, nearly 8% were Portuguese, British 5%, Spanish 5%, Italians 4%, Germans 4%, Romanians 3%, 3% Belgians.

With the increase of Spanish, Portuguese and Italian in France, the weight of European immigrants arrived in 2012 to 46%, while this percentage for African reached 30%, with a presence in Morocco (7%), Algeria (7%) and Tunisia (3%).

Meanwhile, 14% of all immigrants who settled in France that year were from Asian countries: 3% of China and 2% in Turkey, while in America and Oceania constitute 10% of Americans and Brazilians accounted for higher percentage, 2% each.

==== Maghrebis in France ====
People of Maghrebi origin form the largest ethnic group in the country after those of European origin.

According to Michèle Tribalat, a researcher at INED, there were 3.5 million people of Maghrebi origin (with at least one grandparent from Algeria, Morocco or Tunisia) living in France in 2005 corresponding to 5.8% of the total French metropolitan population (60.7 million in 2005). Maghrebis have settled mainly in the industrial regions in France, especially in the Paris region. Many famous French people like Edith Piaf, Isabelle Adjani, Arnaud Montebourg, Alain Bashung, Dany Boon and many others have Maghrebi ancestry.

Below is a table of population of Maghrebi origin in France, numbers are in thousands:

Country	1999	2005	% 1999/2005	% French population (60.7 million in 2005)
Algeria	1,577	1,865	+18.3%	3.1%
Immigrants	574	679		
Born in France	1,003	1,186		
Morocco	1,005	1,201	+19.5%	2.0%
Immigrants	523	625		
Born in France	482	576		
Tunisia	417	458	+9.8%	0.8%
Immigrants	202	222		
Born in France	215	236		
Total Maghreb	2,999	3,524	+17.5%	5.8%
Immigrants	1 299	1 526		2.5%
Born in France	1 700	1 998		3.3%

In 2005, the percentage of young people under 18 of Maghrebi origin (at least one immigrant parent) was about 7% in Metropolitan France, 12% in Greater Paris and above 20% in French département of Seine-Saint-Denis.

2005	Seine-Saint-Denis	Val-de-Marne	Val-d'Oise	Lyon	Paris	France
Total Maghreb	22.0%	13.2%	13.0%	13.0%	12.1%	6.9%

According to other sources, between 5 and 6 million people of Maghrebin origin live in France corresponding to about 7–9% of the total French metropolitan population.

==== Immigration policy ====
As mentioned above, the French Ministry of Immigration, Integration, National Identity and Codevelopment was created immediately following the appointment of Nicolas Sarkozy as president of France in 2007. Immigration has been a relevant political dimension in France's agenda in recent years. Sarkozy's agenda has sharpened the focus placed on integration of immigrants living in France as well as their acquisition of national identity. The state of immigration policy in France is fourfold. Its pillars of immigration policy are to regulate migratory flows in and out of France, facilitate immigrants' integration and promote French identity, honor the French tradition's principle of welcoming political asylum and promote solidarity within the immigrant population (principle of co-development). In its 2010 Budget report, the Ministry of Immigration declared it would fund €600 million for its immigration policy objectives, a figure representing 60 million more than in 2009 (otherwise an 11.5% increase from 2009 figures).

In July 2006, President Sarkozy put into effect a law on immigration based upon the notion of "chosen immigration", which allows immigration into France to a restricted field of employment sectors, notably the hotel and restaurant industries, construction and seasonal employment. The following summer of 2007, Sarkozy amended the law to require the acquisition of the French language as a pre-condition. According to Christophe Bertossi, immigration expert in France's Institut français des relations internationales (IFRI), "there is a dominant trend in the French policy to stem family migration, notably conditioned after the 2007 law by a minimum level of French language tested and by the demonstration that he/she endorses the main French constitutional principles".

Despite Sarkozy's law, immigration from former colonies in the Maghreb and West Africa would end up steadily increasing under the presidencies of Nicolas Sarkozy, François Hollande and Emmanuel Macron.

France, along with other EU countries, have still not signed their agreement to the United Nations Convention on the Protection of the Rights of All Migrant Workers and Members of Their Families of 1990. This convention is a treaty to protect migrant workers' rights, in recognition of their human rights.

Alternative policies have been discussed in formulating immigration policy, such as a quota system. At the beginning of 2008, as the government was rethinking its orientation on immigration policy with the creation of the new ministry, the idea of a quota system was introduced as a possible alternative. In early 2008, a proposal was made to Parliament to decide each year how many immigrants to accept, based on skill and origin. However, this quota policy contradicts the French Constitution. A commission was formed in February 2008 to study how the Constitution could be changed to allow for a quota system. The main difficulty is the origin principle of establishing a quota "constituting a breach in the universalistic ideology of the French Republic".

On 18 January 2008, the government published a list of 150 job titles that were encountering difficult supply of labour. Most immigrants living in France today are reported to cover the following sectors: agriculture, service to persons in need (childcare, the elderly), construction, education, health and services to businesses. Thus, the government is seeking to match immigrants with the economic makeup of France. The current administration could also seek to integrate migrants and their families through education and training, making them more competitive in the job market. To tackle critical labour shortages, France also decided to participate in the EU Blue Card.

Therefore, the outlook towards immigrants in France is shifting as unemployment continues to dominate the political agenda, along with political incentives to strengthen French national identity. Recent incidents, such as the 2005 civil unrest and Romani repatriation have shed light on France's immigration policies and how these are viewed globally, especially in congruence or discontinuity with the EU. A longitudinal study has been conducted since March 2010 to provide qualitative research regarding the integration of new immigrants. The report is being finalized at the end of December 2010 and will be most relevant to provide insight into further immigration policy analysis for the French government.

== Languages ==
French is the only official language of France, and is constitutionally required to be the language of government and administration. There is a rising cultural awareness of the regional languages of France, which enjoy no official status. These regional languages include the Langues d'oïl, Occitan, Franco-Provençal, Corsican, Catalan, Basque, Breton, Germanic languages like Alsatian, and several languages spoken in Overseas France. Immigrant groups from former French colonies and elsewhere have also brought their own languages.

== Religion ==
Religion in France in 2021 by the CIA
1. Catholicism (47.0%)
2. Islam (4.00%)
3. Protestantism (2.00%)
4. Buddhism (2.00%)
5. Orthodox (1.00%)
6. Judaism (1.00%)
7. Other Religions (1.00%)
8. No religion or unspecified (42.0%)

France has not collected religious or ethnic data in its censuses since the beginning of the Third Republic. France guarantees freedom of faith and religion via the 1789 Declaration of the Rights of Man and of the Citizen and by the principle of laïcité (or "freedom of conscience") enforced by the 1880s Jules Ferry laws and the 1905 law on the Separation of the Churches and the State. France does not have a state religion.

Church attendance is fairly low, and the proportion of the population that is not religious has grown over the past century. A 2011 IFOP survey found that 44% of the French people did not believe in God, contrasted to 20% in 1947. Another IFOP survey of 18–30 year-olds in 2020 found that 36% agree with the statement that "Religion represents something very important in my daily life."

Christianity is the largest religion in France, comprising roughly half of the population. France's predominant faith has been Catholicism since the early Middle Ages. According to a poll conducted in 2009 for the French Catholic magazine La Croix, 64% of the population is Catholic and 3.1% is Protestant.

Islam is the 2nd largest religion in France. A 2016 survey held by Institut Montaigne and IFOP found that 5.6% of the French population had an Islamic background, while 5.3% declared they were Muslims by faith.

The other religions make up less than 5% of the population. As of 2015, Buddhism has around 1 million adherents, Judaism has around 500,000 adherents, with approximately 40% identifying as Sephardic, 26% as Ashkenazi, and 14% as a mix from both communities. Jehovah's Witnesses estimate they have approximately 120,000 members. Orthodox Christians number between 80,000 and 100,000; most are associated with the Greek or Russian Orthodox Churches. The Church of Scientology estimates it has 45,000 members. The Church of Jesus Christ of Latter-day Saints (Mormons) estimates its membership at 36,000 in metropolitan France and 22,000 in overseas departments and territories. According to the Sikh community, there are 30,000 Sikhs, with the largest concentration in the Parisian suburbs.

== List of France's largest aires urbaines (metropolitan areas) ==
The following is a list of the twenty largest aires urbaines (metropolitan areas) in France, based on their population at the 2015 census. Population at the 2006 census is indicated for comparison.

Between 2006 and 2011, Toulouse, Rennes, Montpellier, Nantes, Bordeaux and Lyon had the fastest-growing metropolitan areas in France.

Rank (2015)	Rank (2006)	Aire urbaine (metropolitan area)	Population (2015)	Population (2006)	Yearly change (2006–2011)	Land area (km^{2})
1	1	Paris	12,532,901	11,956,493	+0.56%	17,174
2	2	Lyon	2,291,763	2,085,107	+0.98%	6,019
3	3	Marseille – Aix-en-Provence	1,752,938	1,692,459	+0.33%	3,174
4	4	Toulouse	1,330,954	1,169,865	+1.34%	5,381
5	5	Lille (French part)	1,215,769	1,152,507	+0.12%	926
6	6	Bordeaux	1,184,708	1,086,106	+0.99%	5,613
7	7	Nice	1,005,891	995,968	+0.16%	2,585
8	8	Nantes	949,316	841,404	+1.00%	3,302
9	9	Strasbourg (French part)	780,515	749,766	+0.38%	2,198
10	12	Rennes	719,840	637,673	+1.29%	3,747
11	10	Grenoble	690,050	659,459	+0.47%	2,621
12	11	Rouen	663,743	643,499	+0.36%	2,367
13	13	Toulon	622,895	598,514	+0.28%	1,196
14	15	Montpellier	599,965	529,401	+1.18%	1,673
15	14	Douai – Lens	539,715	545,636	−0.10%	679
16	17	Avignon	527,731	501,866	+0.52%	2,083
17	16	Saint-Étienne	515,585	508,284	+0.01%	1,689
18	18	Tours	492,722	469,244	+0.47%	3,184
19	19	Clermont-Ferrand	479,096	454,553	+0.55%	2,420
20	20	Nancy	435,336	432,481	+0.10%	2,367

Urbanization
urban population: 81% of total population (2020)
rate of urbanization: 0.72% annual rate of change (2015–20 est.)

== See also ==
- French people – officially a nationality, also discusses overseas French descendants.
- List of French people of immigrant origin
- List of French people
- Racism in France
- List of fifteen largest French metropolitan areas by population
- INSEE code
- Pieds-noirs, the name for French settlers in Algeria
- Caldoches
- Population of Paris
- Demographics of Paris
- Jews in France
- French immigration to Puerto Rico
- French Portuguese
- French Canadian
- French American
- Franco-Mauritian
- Roma in France
- Immigration statistics in France
