= Eugenics in France =

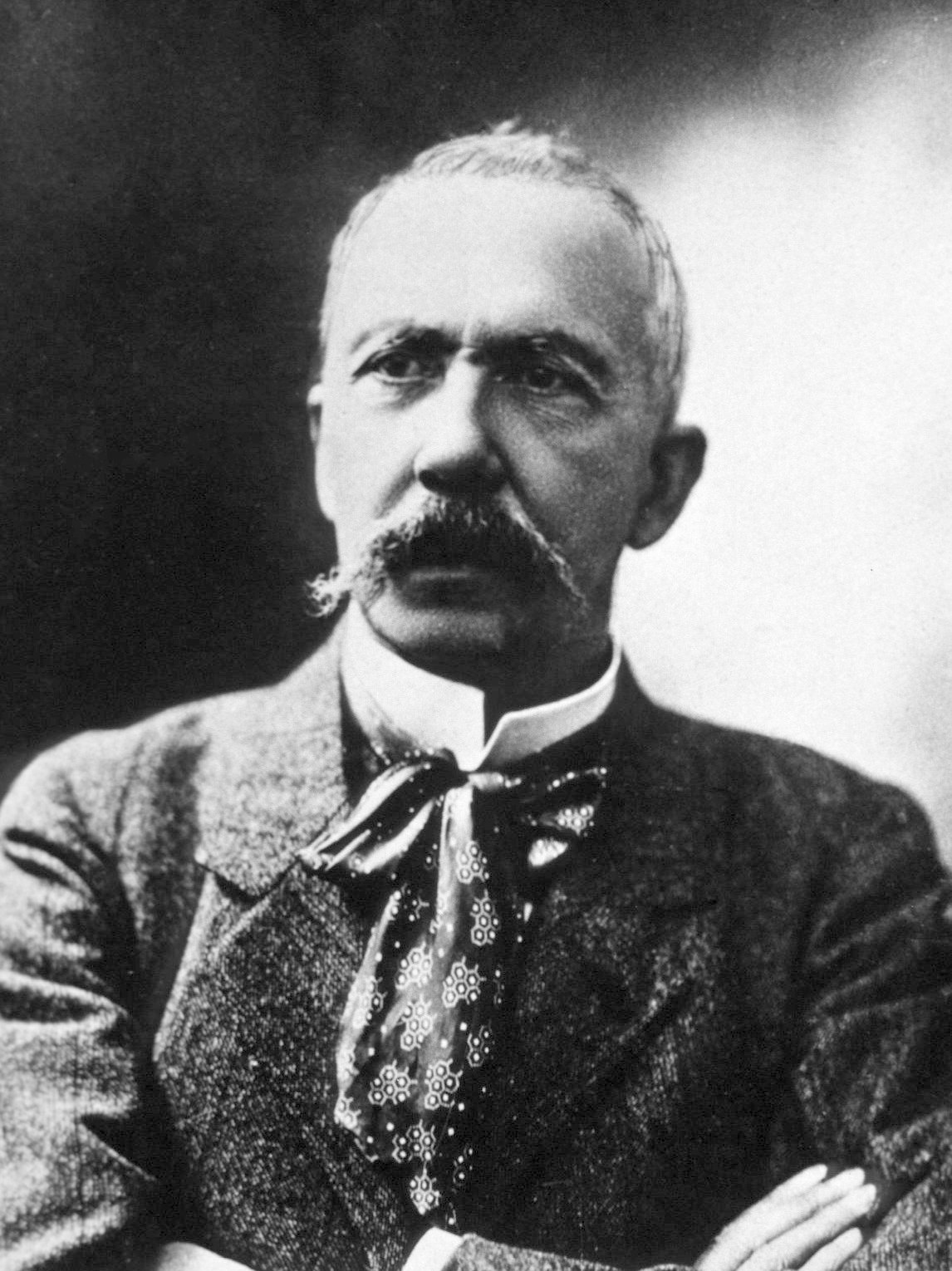
Charles Richet, winner of the Nobel Prize for Medicine in 1913, and President of the French Eugenics Society from 1920 to 1926.

Despite its political failure under the Third Republic, eugenics in France experienced early and thorough theoretical development. This medical eugenics ideology advocated for the formation of a human elite under the guidance of the French state as early as the late 18th century. Subsequent awareness of the theories of British anthropologist and statistician Francis Galton, the first theorist of eugenics, led to the creation of the French Society of Eugenics in 1913.

Despite the numerous calls from French eugenics theorists for interventionist measures that persisted until the first half of the 20th century, this ideology exerted a negligible influence on French citizens, in contrast to its impact on those in Anglo-Saxon countries and the Third Reich. France's adoption of a single law inspired by eugenics was limited to the establishment of a mandatory prenuptial certificate under the Vichy regime. The reasons for this failure are numerous and are particularly linked to the influence of Catholicism, neo-Lamarckism, and depopulation resulting from wars.

The most prominent proponents of eugenics included Nobel Prize-winning physician Charles Richet, who served as president of the French Society of Eugenics and advocated for the elimination of disabled children, and Alexis Carrel, who directed the French Foundation for the Study of Human Problems during the Vichy regime. In the late 19th century, Paul Robin personified the neo-Malthusian branch of French eugenics. Pediatrician Adolphe Pinard developed an ambitious project for controlling reproduction, and military doctor Charles Binet-Sanglé proposed the creation of a "human stud farm." Notwithstanding the subsequent trial of Nazi doctors in Nuremberg for crimes against humanity, the eugenics ideology continued to be defended, albeit briefly, by biologist Jean Rostand during the 1950s. This defense was facilitated by a lack of awareness regarding the atrocities committed in the name of eugenics on German soil, which resulted in a paucity of official condemnations of these practices in France.

The advent of a novel form of eugenics in France, akin to that observed in other Western countries, has given rise to a series of ethical dilemmas concerning medical practices since the 1990s, particularly in the aftermath of the Perruche case. Following the enactment of the inaugural bioethics legislation in 1994, France formally denounced all forms of collective eugenic selection as "crimes against the human species." Nevertheless, the nation permits the practice of individual choice of births. The discourse surrounding eugenics has been reinvigorated by inquiries concerning medical practices such as prenatal diagnosis (PND), preimplantation diagnosis (PGD), and selective abortion, formally recognized as medical termination of pregnancy (MTP) in French legislation, which is authorized at any stage in instances of suspected severe genetic diseases or disabilities. This has led to a discourse surrounding the ethical considerations of preimplantation genetic diagnosis (PGD), a process that involves the screening of embryos for specific genetic abnormalities, and selective abortion, defined as the termination of a pregnancy to avoid giving birth to a child with a suspected or detected disability, such as Down syndrome or dwarfism. This has prompted extensive deliberations among medical professionals, ethicists, philosophers, association leaders, and political figures, leading to the refinement of bioethical legislation in France.

== Sources and definition ==
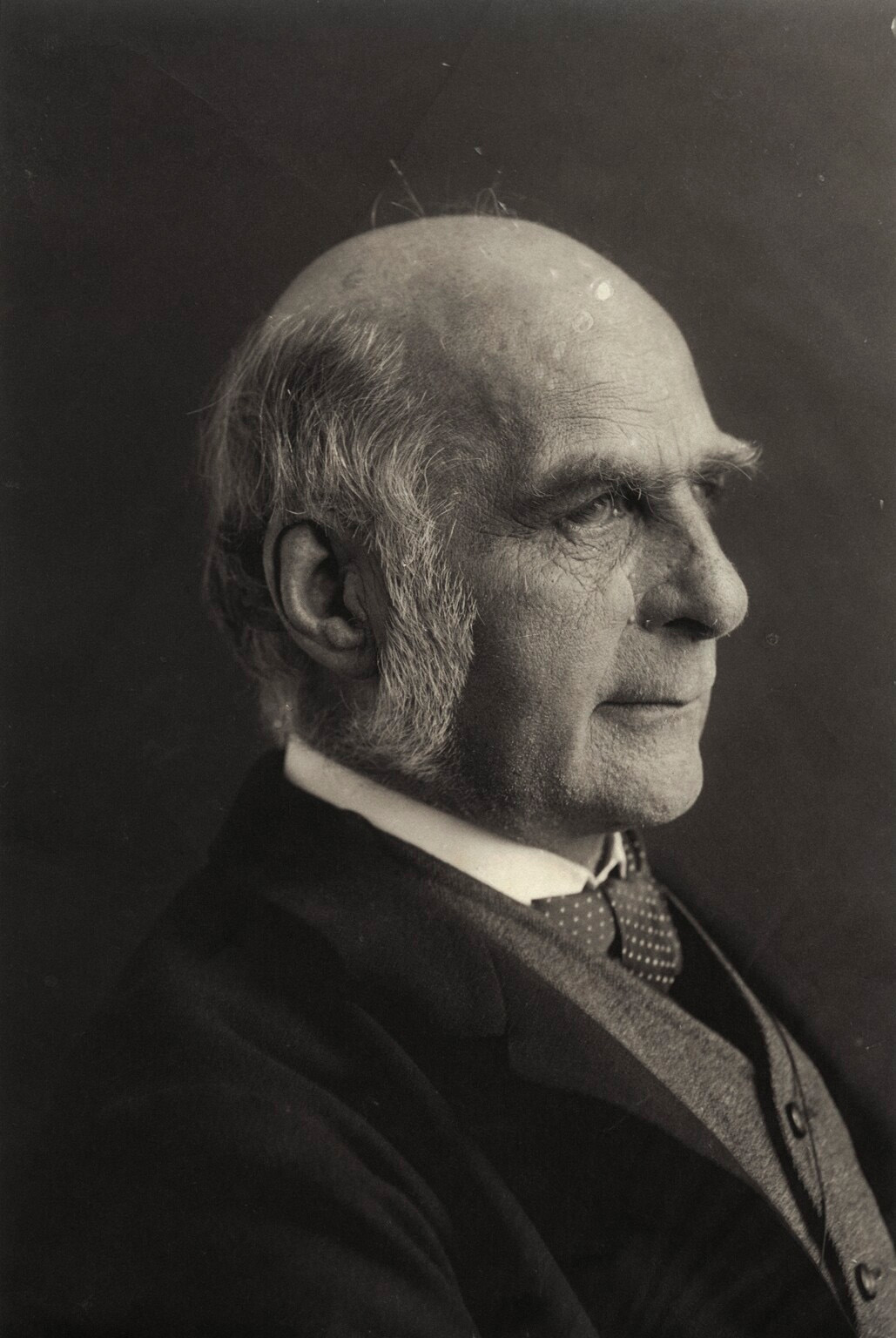
Francis Galton, first theorist of eugenics.

In France, in particular, eugenics is a taboo subject, described as "shameful, long stigmatized after World War II," according to historian Anne Carol, and "anathematized in French historiography," according to historian Valentine Hoffbeck. This field of research was opened by Jacques Léonard, a historian specializing in medicine and health, who officially led a postgraduate program (D.E.A.) in 1984 dedicated to the origins of eugenics in France at the University of Rennes-II. It has only attracted the attention of historians—mostly French—since the 1990s. Previously, it was approached through the lens of political science.

Anne Carol, whose thesis focuses on French eugenics, highlights the difficulties posed by this subject, particularly in terms of anachronism (reinterpreting the past in light of knowledge about the Nazi genocide). According to her, this creates two major methodological pitfalls: “systematically denouncing the worst” and praising French eugenics because France did not experience ‘criminal excesses.’

The promotion of eugenics in French society was primarily carried out by doctors, leading it sometimes to be labeled as “medical eugenics.” Most defenders of historical eugenic ideology came from the Faculty of Medicine in Paris and, more rarely, from General Statistics. According to Anne Carol, the strong involvement of doctors in this movement represents a French specificity compared to the development of eugenics in other countries, particularly the United Kingdom, where statisticians mainly drove its defense. At first glance, the association between "eugenics" and "medical" seems contradictory—the former referring to the physical elimination of individuals, and the latter to care, healing, ethics, and the duty of assistance.

=== International definitions of eugenics ===
The definition of eugenics proposed by its British theorist, Francis Galton, remains a subject of considerable debate. The concept encompasses any influence on "human selection," whether through genetic or environmental factors. Additionally, Galton's definition underwent a gradual evolution. In 1904, he characterized eugenics as "the science that deals with all influences that improve the innate qualities of a race." It is imperative to discern between the "positive" form of eugenics, which prioritizes the selection of "superior" individuals, and the "negative" form, which involves the physical removal of those deemed to be "dysgenic."

=== Terminology ===
Race et milieu social, one of Georges Vacher de Lapouge's writings developing the notion of eugenics in France.

A terminological challenge emerges when exploring the history of eugenics in France. The English word "eugenics," first translated into French in 1886, has been introduced to the French language in two forms, both channelled by the racist theorist Georges Vacher de Lapouge. The first, "eugénique," was used to denote individuals who exhibited above-average intellectual abilities, while the second, "eugénisme," was employed to describe the inverse phenomenon of degeneration.

There are families of degenerates … . There are families of criminals. In others, talent is inherited by birthright, like health, strength, and beauty … . These are the eugeniques, and eugenics is the smile of heredity, just as degeneration is its curse.

Before 1914, the term eugénisme was seldom used in French. Initially, publications advocating human selection employed a variety of expressions or neologisms, including "human breeding," "viriculture," "hominiculture," "anthropogenetics," and "biocracy." Adolphe Pinard, in particular, preferred the term "puériculture," which he described as the pursuit of "knowledge related to reproduction, preservation, and improvement of the human species" over eugénique or eugénisme. Pediatricians could thus conceal their eugenic objectives. In his doctoral thesis in medicine, Dr. Louis Simon proposed the term eugénétique.

=== French eugenic ideological currents ===
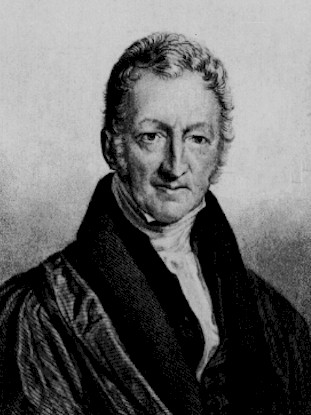
Thomas Malthus, whose ideas on the poor later inspired the development of eugenics in France and other countries.

According to the historian and sociologist Pierre-André Taguieff, eugenics is an inherently interventionist ideology that is state-based. The ideology of eugenics traditionally draws from the ideology of Thomas Malthus (Malthusianism), who believed that the poor were responsible for their plight because they reproduced despite lacking the material means to support themselves. Additionally, it draws from interpretations of Charles Darwin's theories, known as social Darwinism, which argue that only the strongest and best-adapted individuals survive. Eugenics theorist Francis Galton drew from both of these ideologies to assert that humanity's natural tendency to help the poor and "weak" must be counteracted to reduce the number of unfit individuals and increase those capable of improving the human species.

Pierre-André Taguieff identifies three distinct eugenic currents in France: a Darwinian, socialist, and Aryanist current championed by the racial anthropologist Georges Vacher de Lapouge; a natalist, Lamarckian, and patriotic current followed The first current, as identified by Taguieff, is a Darwinian, socialist, and Aryanist current championed by the racial anthropologist Georges Vacher de Lapouge. The second current is a natalist, Lamarckian, and patriotic current followed by hygienists, physicians (including pediatrician Adolphe Pinard), and educators, who opposed birth control. The third current is a neo-Malthusian, pacifist, and libertarian eugenics influenced by feminism and particularly promoted by educator Paul Robin.

Ethicist Gwen Terrenoire identifies five ideological currents: a medical current led by Adolphe Pinard, a racist current led by Vacher de Lapouge and later by Charles Richet, a neo-Malthusian current promoted by Paul Robin and continued by Édouard Toulouse, an interventionist current advocating sterilizations and marriage controls promoted by the French Eugenics Society during the 1930s, and a biocratic current led by Alexis Carrel.

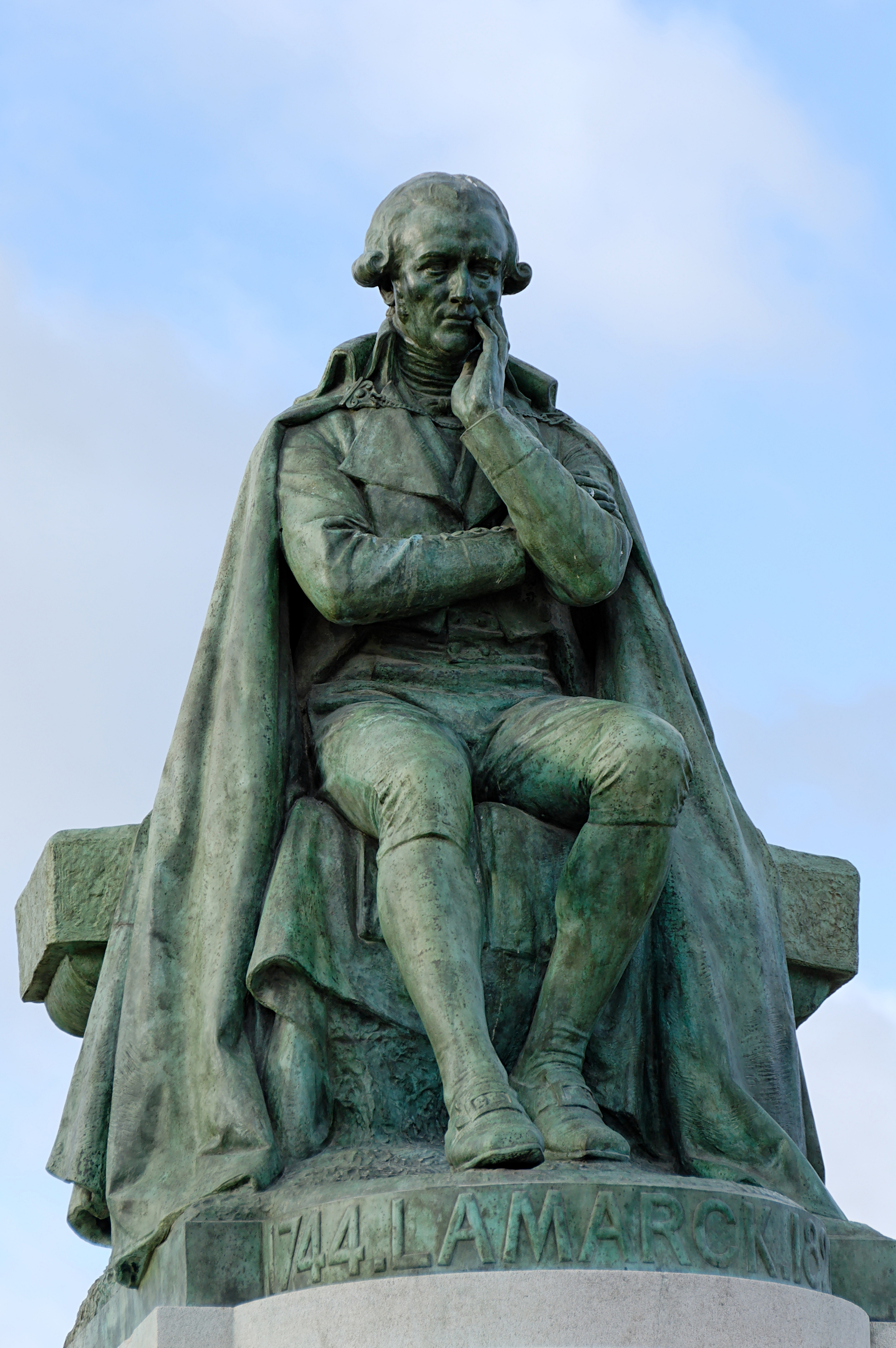
Jean-Baptiste de Lamarck, whose interpretation of the texts and statements gave rise to neo-Lamarckism, an ideology that had a profound influence on the history of eugenics in France.

Taguieff's observations reveal that certain currents within these movements were characterized by mutual exclusivity. In contrast to the predominantly Darwinian approach found in Anglo-Saxon eugenics, French ideology exhibited a stronger inclination towards Lamarckian principles. This neo-Lamarckism, which emerged as a response to the prevailing hereditary theories of the era, significantly influenced the development of French eugenics by emphasizing the concept of environmental degeneration and the role of social influences. This distinctive approach marked a notable distinction between French eugenics and other European movements within the same period.

Historian and sociologist Alain Drouard examined the neo-Malthusian eugenics current more closely, highlighting significant overlaps between neo-Malthusianism and negative eugenics, as well as continuity in the associative commitments of proponents of both ideologies.

== History ==
France's implementation of eugenic principles within its legal framework was comparatively modest when evaluated against other nations. For instance, France did not adopt legislation authorizing voluntary or compulsory sterilization for mental disability or criminality, a practice that was prevalent in numerous Western countries. According to Taguieff, the adoption of eugenics in France might be perceived as a non-introduction, given its distinct historical and social context. The contrast with Britain and, more notably, the United States is particularly salient: France did not witness a comparable eugenics movement that influenced significantly its political policies. Historian of science Alexandre Moatti offers a nuanced perspective on this observation, highlighting that despite the limited practical applications, the theoretical development of eugenic ideas in France was both early and highly sophisticated.

=== Origins of French eugenics before Francis Galton ===
According to Anne Carol, a distinct form of eugenics emerged in France that was distinct from Galton's thought. This eugenics addressed unrelated issues and emerged as a by-product of the evolution of medicine itself. The primary motivation behind this development was to combat "human degeneration" and regulate unions and procreation. Notwithstanding the absence of a specific term for this concept during this period, the late 19th century French medical literature advocated theories that could be classified as "incipient eugenics." William Max Nelson, a lecturer at the University of Toronto, in collaboration with historians Richard S. Fogarty and Michael A. Osborne from the University of California, opts to characterize this phenomenon as "proto-eugenics."

According to Anne Carol, the earliest contributions to French eugenics can be traced back to the 17th century. During this period, treatises on the "art of procreation" began to be published, primarily intended for parents in private. These treatises contain extensive lists of factors believed to contribute to "good offspring" and introduce the concept of "degeneration" of the human species. The Latin poem La Callipédie, first published in 1655, offers counsel on the selection of progenitors, underscoring the importance of physical integrity.

Beginning in the late 18th century, treatises began to address legislators, proposing collective measures in the "public interest." For example, Charles-Augustin Vandermonde's Essay on the Way to Perfect the Human Species (1756) is an illustration of this phenomenon. In 1801, Robert Le Jeune published his Essay on Megalanthropogenesis, a neologism of his creation. In this essay, he advocated for forming a human elite under state guidance through marriage incentives. In that same year, physician P. Mahon articulated his opposition to the union of individuals afflicted with "contagious or hereditary" ailments, proposing explicitly eugenic measures of avoidance. Another source of concern lay in the French colonial empire, where racialists like Guillaume Poncet de la Grave (1725–1803) led active campaigns against interracial marriages between Black men and French women, claiming this would expose French blood to "corruption" and produce "disfigured" children. In Supplement to Bougainville's Voyage (1796), Denis Diderot describes a fictional Tahitian chief, Orou, who promotes sexual relations between Tahitian women and French men to strengthen his people and "regenerate" their intelligence. During the first half of the 19th century, pre-eugenic manuals emphasized Love within the couple, which was believed to produce beautiful and healthy children.

Some pre-galtonic eugenics publications in French

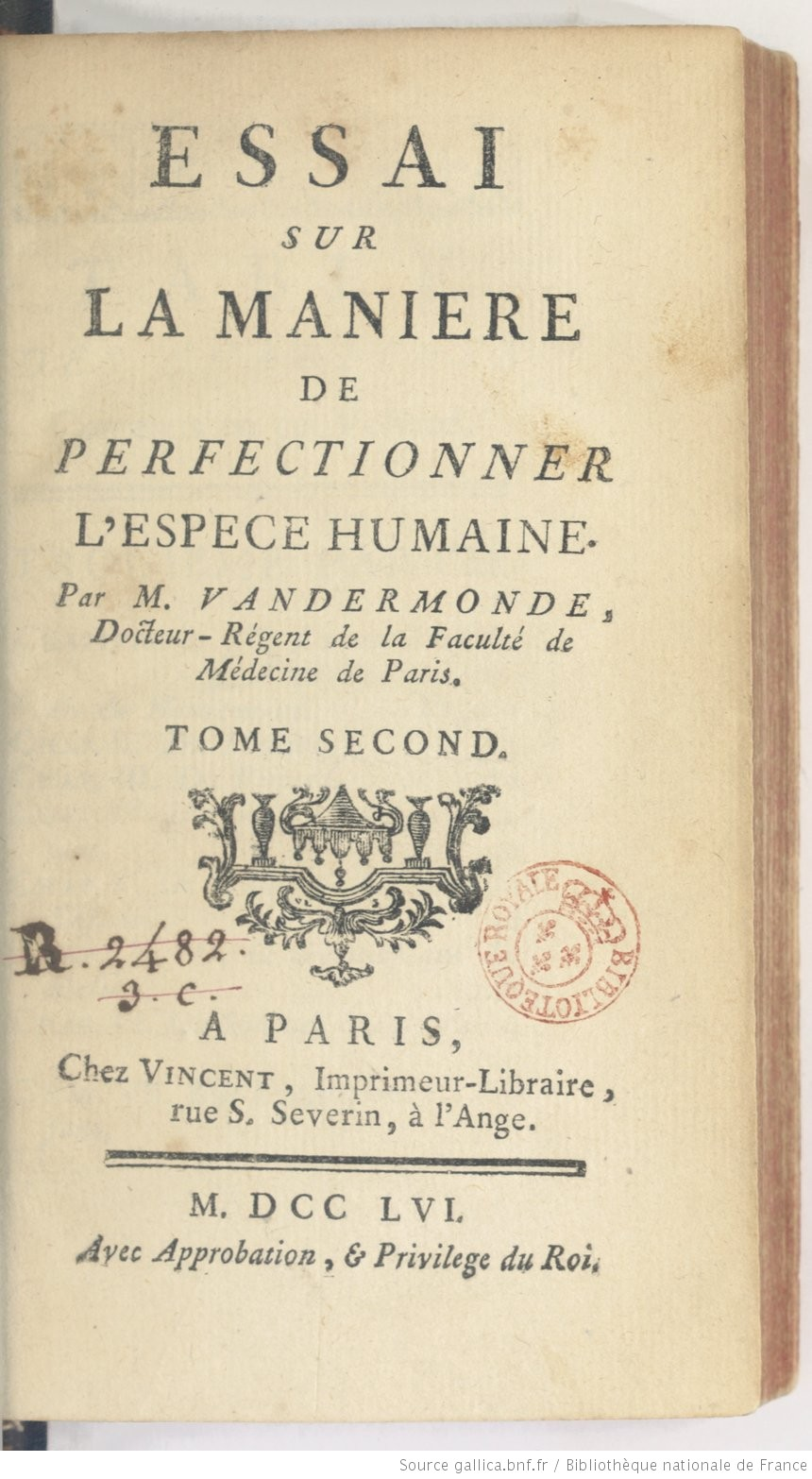
Essai sur la manière de perfectionner l'espèce humaine by Charles-Augustin Vandermonde, 1756.

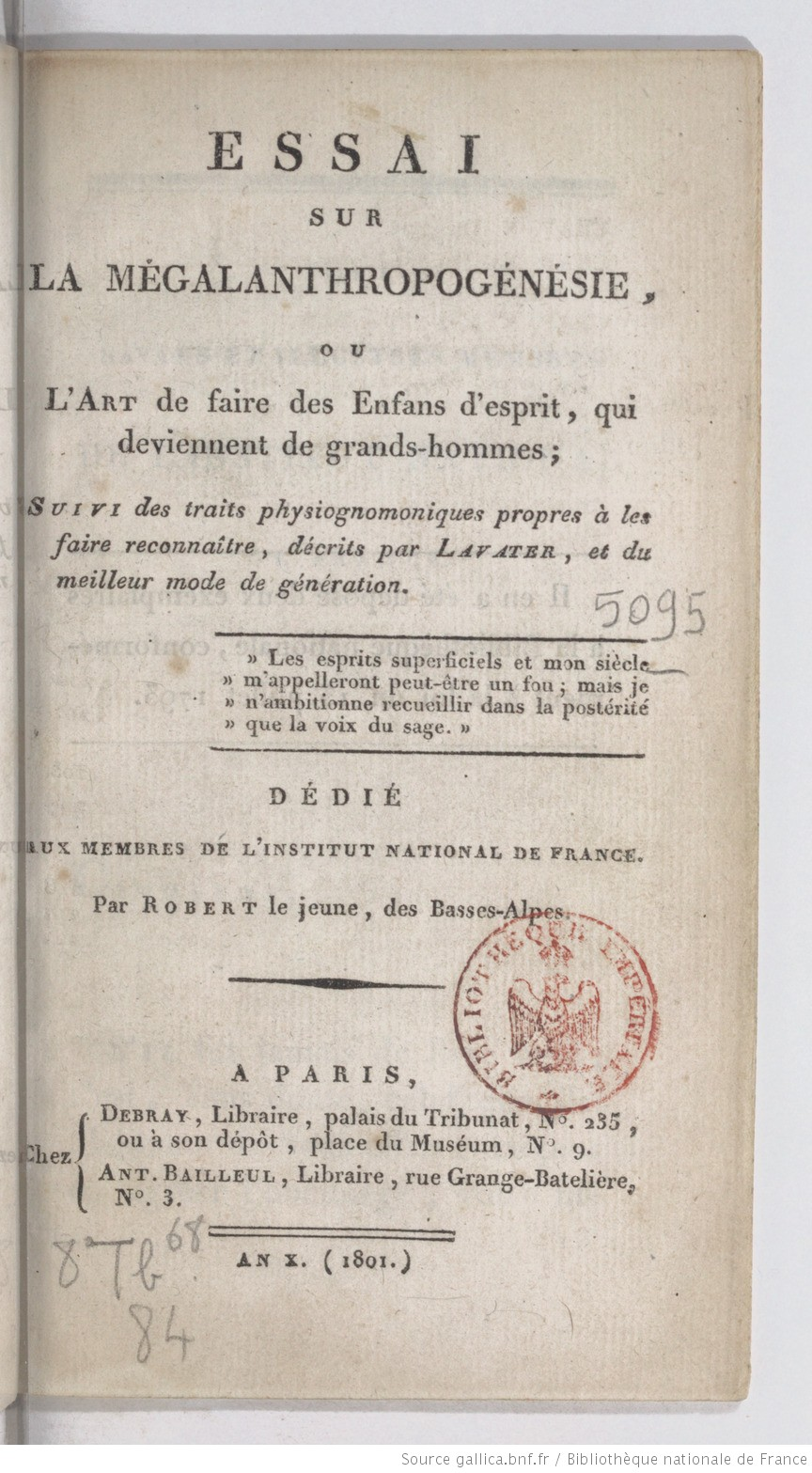
Essay on megalanthropogenesis by Louis-Joseph-Marie Robert, 1801.

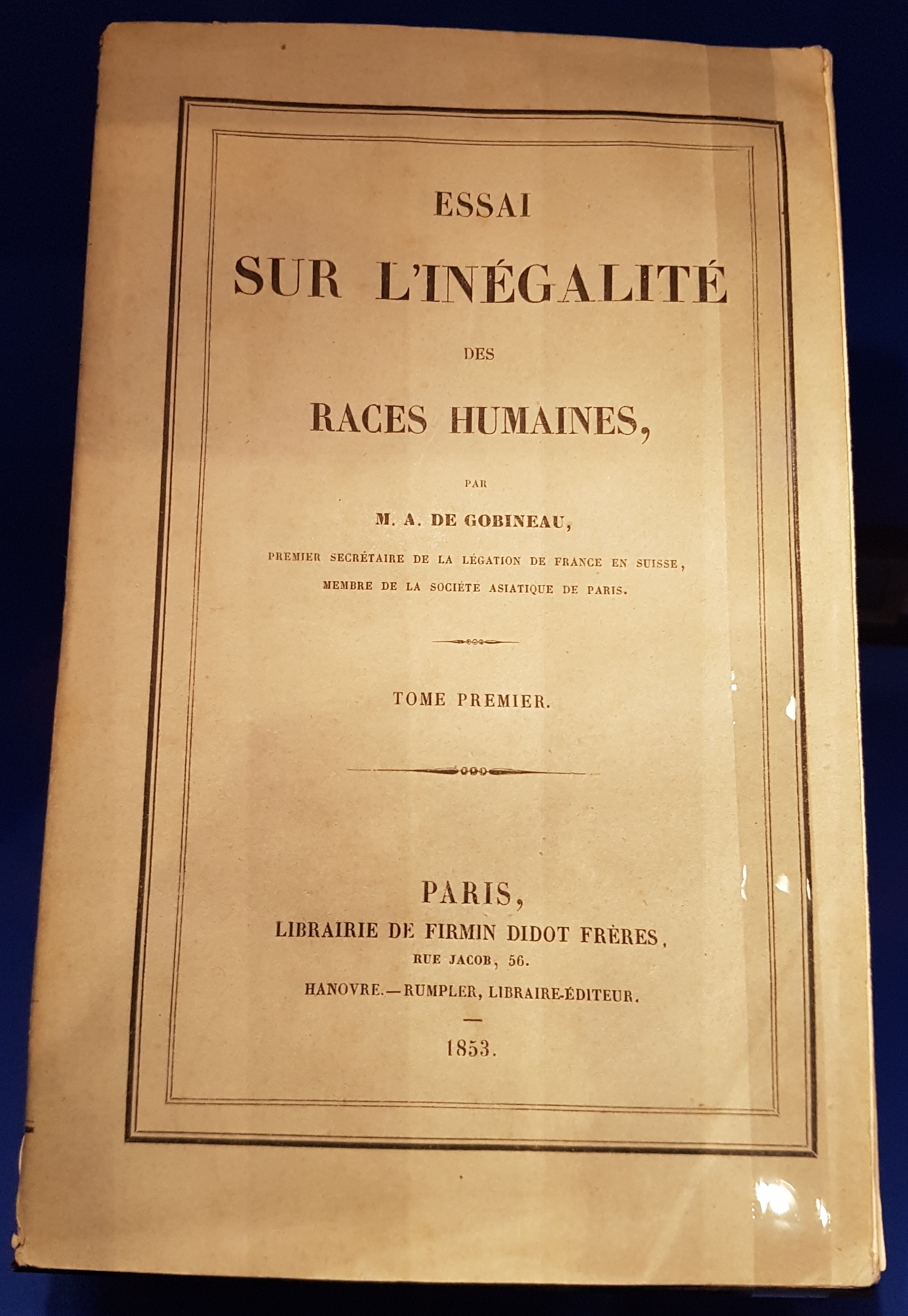
Essay on the inequality of human races by Arthur de Gobineau, 1853-1855.

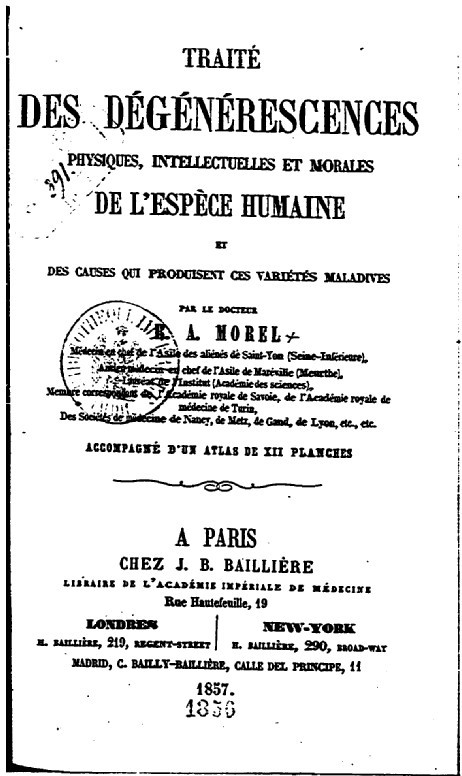
Traité des dégénérescences by Bénédict Morel, 1857.

During the first half of the nineteenth century, pre-eugenic manuals placed significant emphasis on the concept of love within couples, positing that this emotional bond was instrumental in yielding offspring who were both aesthetically pleasing and robust. Arthur de Gobineau's influential Essay on the Inequality of Human Races (1853–1855) introduced a racial dimension to this discourse, establishing classifications and unveiling what Catherine Bachelard-Jobard, a legal scholar, has termed "conceptual articulations characteristic of eugenics." The notion of human degeneration was revived by psychiatrist Bénédict Morel in his 1857 Treatise on Degeneration, which advocated for the establishment of public health programs to prevent it. His alienist disciples expanded on this notion within their field. In 1863, Dr. Rey published Degeneration of the Human Species and its Regeneration, recommending the elimination of sick progenitors and incentives for "regenerative" unions. The theory of degeneration gained significant traction among journalists, politicians, and the general public, fostering a milieu conducive to the emergence of a medical approach to deviant behavior in the mid-nineteenth century. Medicine was positioned as the sole bulwark against these so-called deviations.

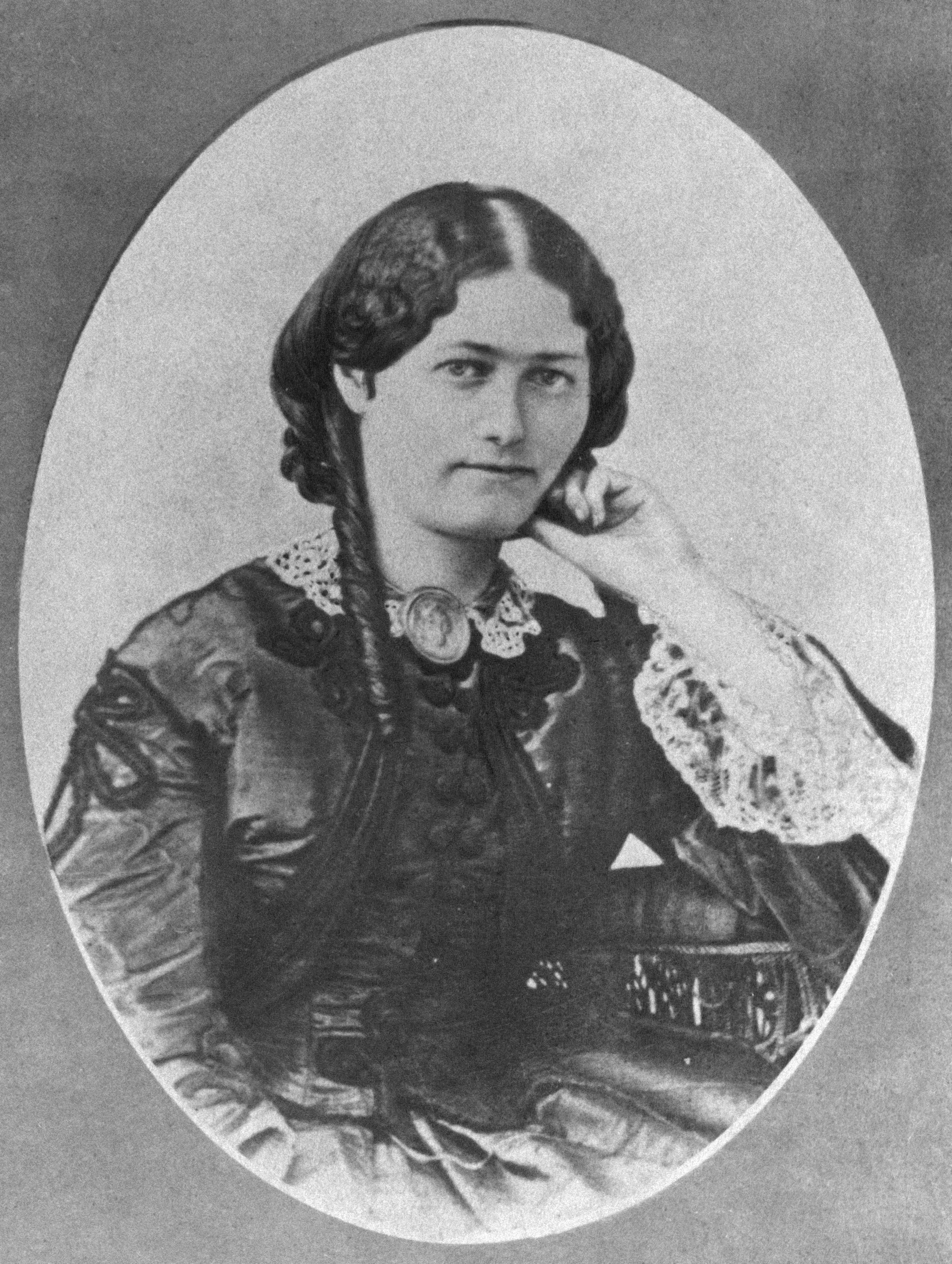
Clémence Royer, photographed here in 1865 at the age of 35 by Nadar, three years after her preface to Charles Darwin's work, is considered to be the author of one of the first eugenics texts published in France.

One of the earliest French texts that can be considered truly eugenic is Clémence Royer's preface to Charles Darwin's work in 1862, in which she expressed a desire to eliminate the weak and infirm. In 1863 and 1864, the young physician Eugène Dally argued that the criminal nature of some individuals could not be changed. Dally introduced the legal concept of moral responsibility and proposed the establishment of asylums to confine incurable deviants for life. The innate or acquired nature of criminality fueled debates of the time, which gradually radicalized toward preventing criminals from being born and reproducing due to the "ineffectiveness" of imprisonment.

The objective of reducing infant mortality constituted a significant concern, thereby enabling medical professionals to intervene during pregnancy and subsequently with very young children. This led to the conceptualization of puericulture, initially formulated as a medical science focused on the hygienic upbringing of young children, which was introduced by A. Caron in 1865 to reduce the number of "degenerate" children. A third source contributing to eugenics lay in venereology, as the desire to prevent the spread of syphilis inspired proposals for premarital screening tests. After France's defeat by Germany in 1870, military medicine entered these debates, promoting a hygienist discourse. According to Anne Carol, individuals advancing these convergent arguments regarded eugenics as the ultimate solution to the problems they raised. The advances in horticulture and animal breeding likely influenced these ideas.

In this context Jacques Léonard asserts that "Galton's eugenics did not fall on virgin soil in France." William H. Schneider, the emeritus professor of history, perceives it as a response to social concerns regarding degeneration and the decline of the population. This perspective is informed by slower population growth compared to Germany following the defeat in the Franco-Prussian War of 1870.

=== Early attempts at implementation ===
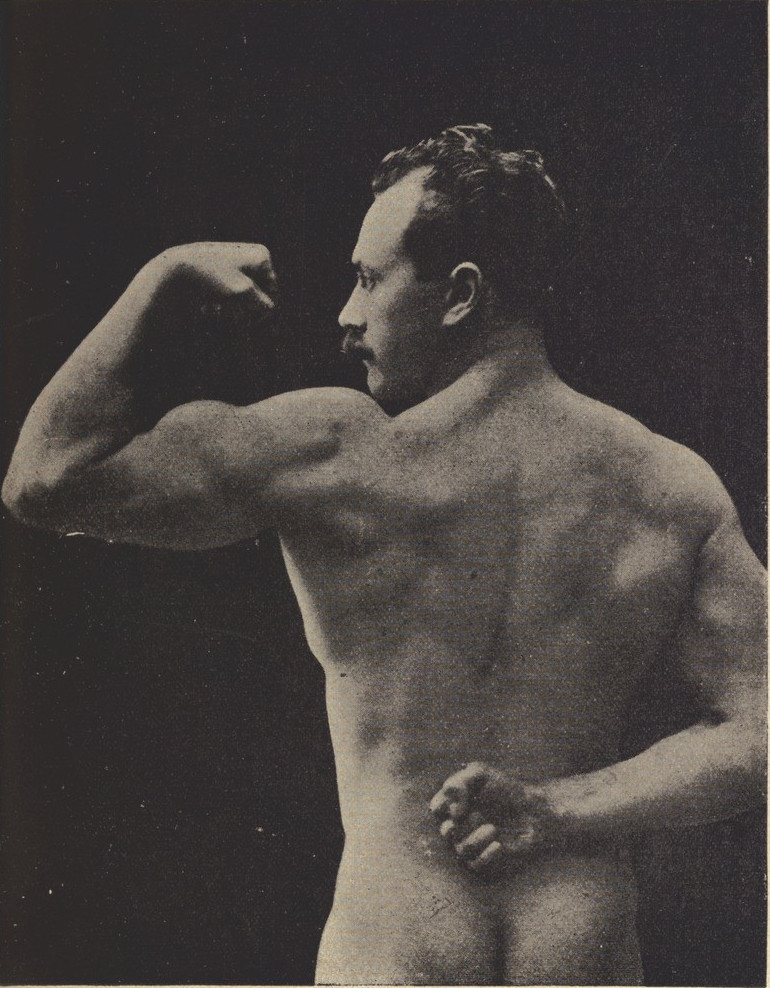
Prof. Edmond Desbonnet posing in his own hygienist and eugenicist work, L'art de créer le Pur-Sang humain, in 1907.

The French eugenics movement, which emerged from the 1880s onward, was founded based on publications and medical concerns, drawing upon the theories of Francis Galton (and his definition of eugenics, formulated in 1883) and Charles Darwin. It was influenced by various national specificities, particularly the influence of natalists, Malthusians, socialists, and hygienists. During the 1890s, these ideas were influenced by the rise of nationalist anti-Semitism, and from the 1900s, the principles of Mendelian genetics were incorporated. A central tenet of this movement was the pursuit of control over human reproduction, marking a departure from the laissez-faire approach. According to Schneider, this movement was not as organized as a eugenic one, but rather a converging of efforts in the fight against "degeneration."

In 1884, Alfred Naquet achieved legal recognition of eugenics as a valid grounds for divorce, presenting it as a health concern that threatened loved ones (e.g., drunkenness, madness). Between 1886 and 1888, the racist theorist Georges Vacher de Lapouge introduced the terms "eugenic" and "eugenics" into French in his publications, which were featured in the Revue d'anthropologie. The neo-Malthusian movement was significantly influenced by Paul Robin, who established the "League for Human Regeneration" in 1896, along with the journal Régénération. In that same year, Maurice Barrès also employed the term "eugenics" in his Cahiers. The establishment of the National Alliance Against Depopulation in 1896 gave rise to recurrent ideological conflicts between neo-Malthusians and natalists. The neo-Malthusians engaged in intense propaganda, disseminating posters, poems, and labels, even affixing them to churches, as reported by the natalists.

At the beginning of the 20th century, concerns regarding eugenics in France were initially provoked by discourse concerning the nation's declining population. This discourse was subsequently reinforced by prominent demographers. Eugenicists expressed concern that marital decisions might be influenced by factors such as commercial interests and financial status, rather than by love and physical attraction.

In 1901, retired medical professor J. Servier proposed in the Archives d'anthropologie criminelle that criminals undergo castration to eliminate "degenerate procreators." In 1902, Paul Robin shocked attendees at a family assistance congress by suggesting the sterilization of parents who "burden humanity with degenerates." Eugenic law proposals met with limited success, particularly the proposed therapeutic abortion for "bad heredity" submitted in 1909. In 1907, Professor Edmond Desbonnet and Dr. Rouhet published L'Art de créer le Pur-Sang humain, a work that constituted an ode to a "neo-Lamarckian eugenic art," according to art professor Fae Brauer. This work praised Western beauty, juxtaposed with the concept of the "Pure-Blooded Body" and Greek statuary. The authors lauded romantic unions between "strong and beautiful" men and women, aligning with a prevailing ethos of eugenics and the glorification of physical beauty. This work is part of a broader series of publications that equated the breeding of humans with the breeding of animals, particularly horses. Examples include L'élevage humain by Maurice Boigey in 1917 and Le haras humain by Charles Binet-Sanglé in 1918.

=== French Society of Eugenics ===
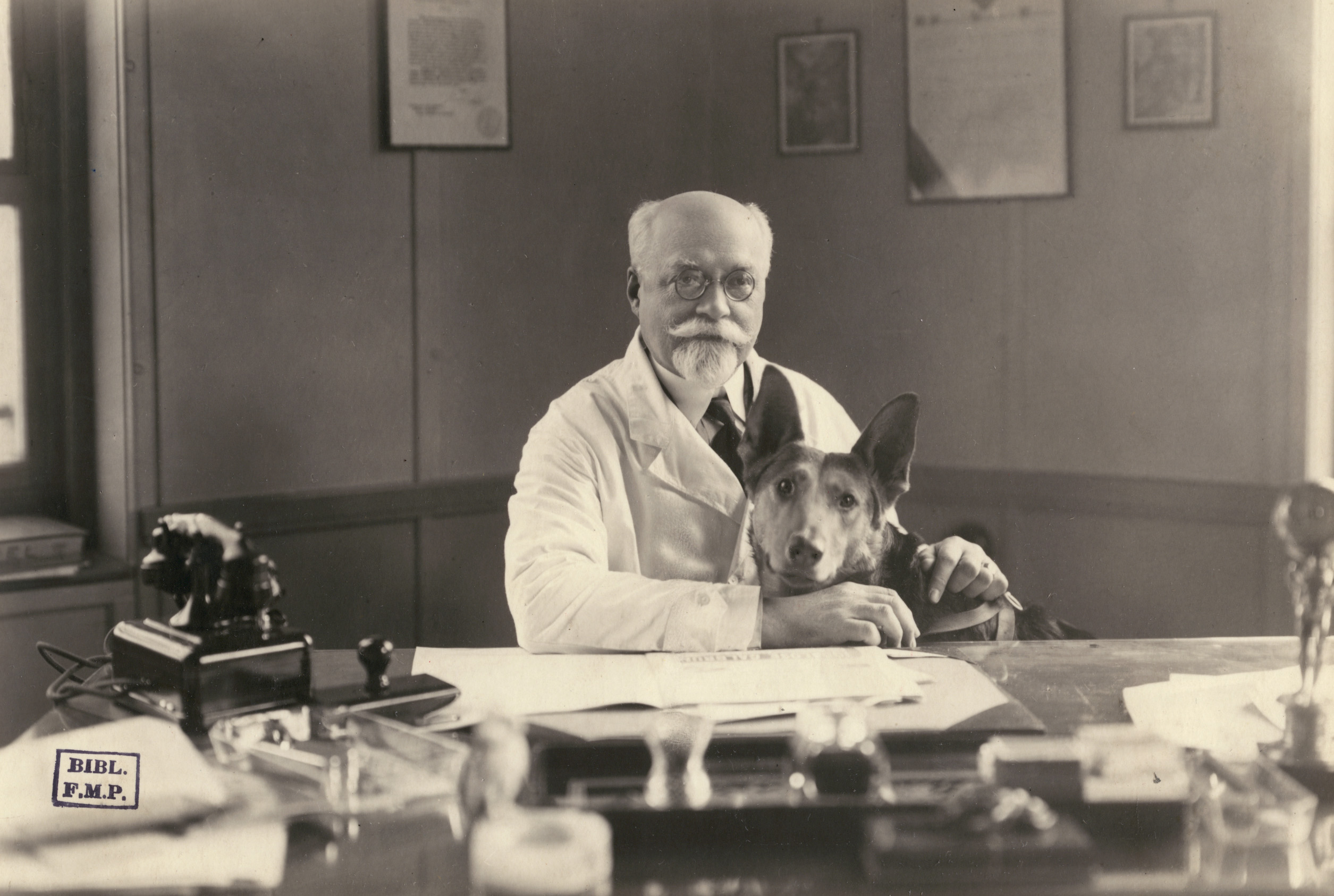
Justin Sicard de Plauzoles, one of SFE's members.

The inaugural international eugenics congress, convened in London in 1912, attracted a French delegation of 40 individuals, predominantly medical professionals, who constituted the "founding core" of the French Society of Eugenics (SFE). Upon their return to France, several participants were convinced of the necessity to organize their forces. The official establishment of the SFE transpired on 29 January 1913, with approximately 60% of its constituents being medical professionals, including the pediatrician Adolphe Pinard and the Nobel Prize-winning physician Charles Richet. Statistician Lucien March engaged in government commissions dedicated to depopulation with Adolphe Pinard. Justin Sicard de Plauzoles, president of the French National League Against Venereal Danger, was also a member of the SFE. De Plauzoles was alarmed by the supposed higher reproduction rate of the "lower classes." Most of the pioneering members of the SFE were "strongly anticlerical, and for some, violently anti-Christian." Richet, along with other eugenics theorists, opposed the concept of Christian charity.

Two conflicting perspectives emerge: one advocating for public and authoritarian intervention, and the other promoting private and incentive-based action. The SFE proposes a preventive and "scientific" approach to address social issues. Given the horrors associated with sterilization practices in other countries, proponents of French eugenics generally favor measures involving the spatial separation of criminals, the "insane," and alcoholics. The SFE exerts considerable ideological influence, and eugenic discourse deeply permeates French medicine. The discourse encompasses a range of contentious subjects, including the castration of criminals, the "reproductive duty" of men considered superior, and recommendations to deploy the least fit individuals, including those with physical and mental disabilities, to the front lines during World War I, a practice euphemistically referred to as "purging" the French population. Eugène Apert, who served as president of the SFE from 1934, placed immigration at the forefront of his concerns.

The French Society of Eugenics encountered limited success due to a lack of financial resources. In 1926, it was absorbed by a division of the International Institute of Anthropology, subsequently leading to the society's dissolution in June 1940.

=== Association for sexological studies ===
A sexological movement, supported by its association, scholarly society, and publication, aimed to "rationalize social and sexual life through science" and was created in the 1930s on the initiative of psychiatrist Édouard Toulouse, an active member of the French Society of Eugenics. Toulouse sought to limit procreation among "mentally deficient" individuals.

The association was established in response to the Catholic Church and conservative parties' opposition to the dissemination of information regarding this "rationalization." Its membership included psychoanalysts and prominent feminist figures, who believed that "the science of human reproduction can only accelerate female emancipation." Even though sexologists "placed significant emphasis on feminist demands," notable disagreements within the association emerged, such as "contraceptive prophylaxis," which only gained the support of a minority of feminists, while for sexologists, birth control was the sine qua non of eugenics and marital happiness. Despite the support of prominent figures, including members of the French psychoanalytic movement (Paul Schiff and Marie Bonaparte), the association had very little impact.

=== A turning point in the 1930s ===
Schneider identifies an ideological turning point in the 1930s, with the expression of much harsher ideas, as negative eugenic measures (forced sterilizations, etc.) began to be discussed among the French medical elites. He attributes the cause of this to the economic crisis.

According to Alexandre Moatti, the eugenics of the 1930s foreshadowed transhumanism, particularly through the writings of engineer Jean Coutrot in 1937, and those of Alexis Carrel in 1935.

=== Under the Vichy regime ===
The Vichy regime was predicated on eugenic ideology, as evidenced by its racist policies, family program, and the multidisciplinary research program of the French Foundation for the Study of Human Problems. The use of IQ tests increased significantly during this period. Renowned eugenicist Dr. René Martial, a lecturer at the Institute of Hygiene at the Paris Faculty of Medicine, furthered his eugenic theories by incorporating Mendelian genetics. These theories influenced racist policies, leading to significant advancements in the study of "many developments on the French race, miscegenation, and the 'unassimilable' Jews."

==== French foundation for the study of human problems ====
In 1941, Alexis Carrel was appointed "regent" of the recently established French Foundation for the Study of Human Problems. This foundation adopted a cautious approach, opting to discontinue the proposed establishment of a "genetics and eugenics" section in the fall of 1942. Nevertheless, it engaged in a collaborative endeavor with the prevailing regime, investigating the "genetic qualities" of immigrant families residing in the Paris suburbs during the deportations to Drancy.

==== Prenuptial certificate ====
The only eugenics-inspired law passed during the Vichy era was a diluted version of the 1926 prenuptial certificate, which was adopted in 1942. This law mandated a medical examination before marriage, though its implications were limited to the absence of any binding value based on any pathologies noted by the doctor. The preamble to the law noted that "for the first time, a measure of eugenics appears in French legislation: the medical examination certificate before marriage."

==== Mortality in psychiatric institutions ====
A relatively obscure fact is that thousands of people interned in French psychiatric asylums died of starvation under the Vichy regime due to food restrictions. This excess mortality affected between 40,000 and 50,000 people across France: 40,000 according to Max Lafont and Lucien Bonnafé; while according to Claude Quétel and Olivier Bonnet, their number is closer to 50,000. The majority of these deaths occurred between 1941 and 1943. Among the artists who perished were Sylvain Fusco, Léona Delcourt, Séraphine de Senlis, and Camille Claudel.

Jewish victims found themselves "at the intersection of eugenics, Christian anti-Judaism, and Nazi racist and anti-Semitic policies." In the single Vinatier hospital, 6,000 victims perished from these restrictions, which were deliberately imposed, as other hospitals received larger food rations.

According to Max Lafont, this cannot be regarded as a purely eugenics policy, as these individuals did not perish as a consequence of a systematic eradication program. Rather, they succumbed to negligence or oversight, which elicited minimal resistance. However, Catherine Bachelard-Jobard contends that this phenomenon may be rooted in a eugenic ideology, which relegates these individuals to "beyond the normality" established by medical professionals and the regime.

=== Eugenics after World War II ===
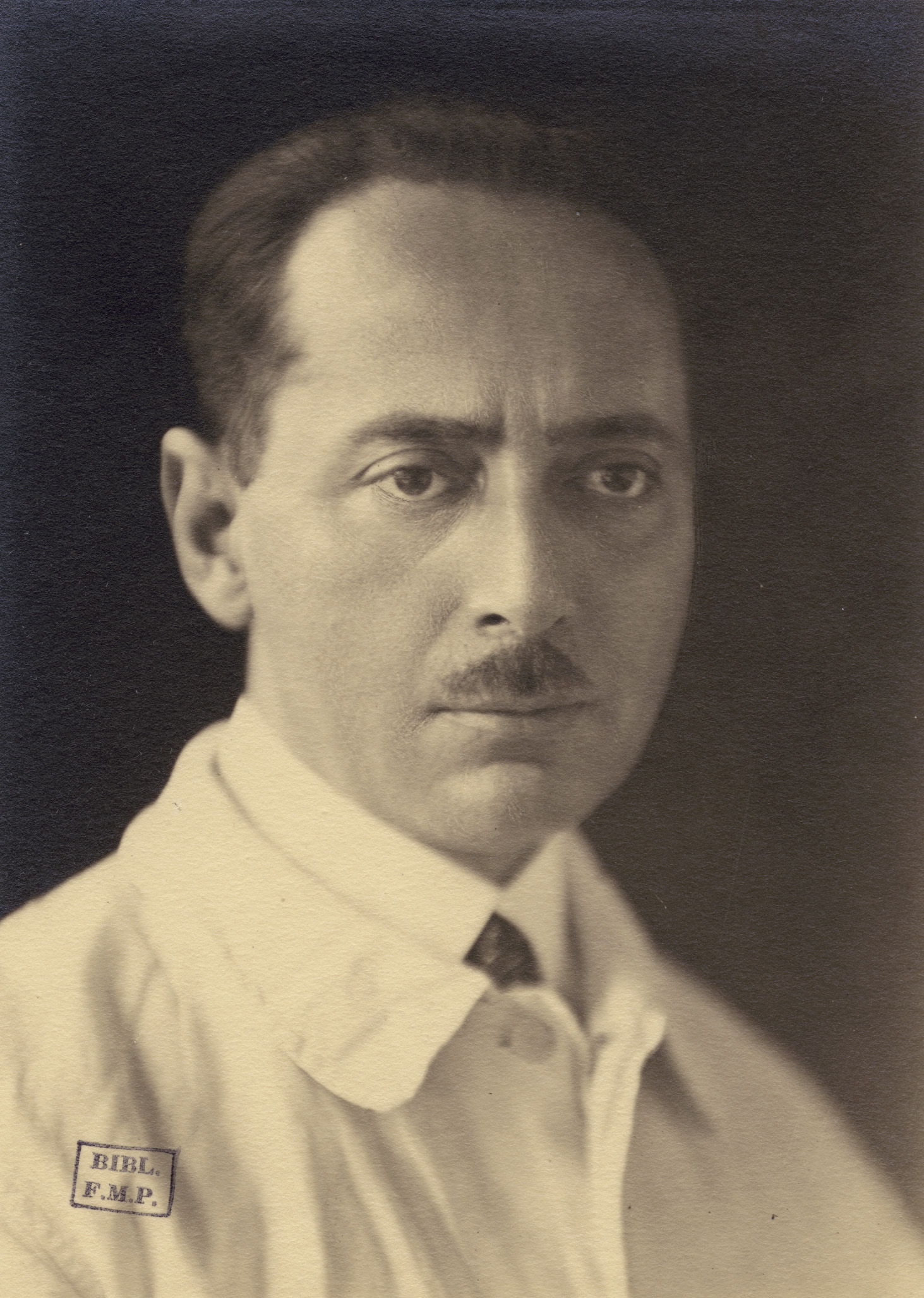
Geneticist Raymond Turpin, active member of the SFE.

The knowledge of the horrors perpetrated by the Nazi regime led to the discrediting of eugenics as a crime against humanity following World War II. However, most researchers at the French Foundation for the Study of Human Problems evaded the purges and were subsequently employed by the National Institute for Demographic Studies (INED). Notably, Paul Schiff, who had firmly condemned eugenics in an article published in 1946 in ‘’Les Temps modernes’’, denounced "the somewhat disdainful silence" of his colleagues (psychoanalysts and alienists) in the face of Nazi practices.

According to science historians Patrick Tort and Alexandre Moatti, a robust ideological denial of the inhuman character of eugenics itself enabled prominent figures who promoted this ideology, most notably biologist Jean Rostand, to persist in its defense during the "Trente Glorieuses"; the notion of enhancing the human genetic heritage remained pervasive. Historian and Inserm research director Jean-Paul Gaudillière further asserts that the careers of Eugène Apert and Raymond Turpin underscore the historical accuracy of a nuanced perspective, one that acknowledges the complexity of the rupture caused by World War II and the consequences of the criticism of Nazi eugenics. The historiography of eugenics in France is characterized by the emergence of a heredity-based medicine that is intertwined with "natalist" pediatrics, which privileges the mother-child complex.

Raymond Turpin, a Parisian and active member of the French Society of Eugenics before the war, was one of the French geneticists responsible for the discovery of the cause of Down syndrome. In 1956, Turpin expressed concern about the survival rates of handicapped babies:

Progressive improvements in general hygiene and nutrition, increasing possibilities in the fight against sterility, in utero mortality, and neonatal mortality, counteract natural selection, and one is right to expect a better survival rate for fragile eggs and embryos, which provide a significant contingent of malformed newborns.

— Raymond Turpin

During the 1970s, a logic informed by scientific progress and eugenics, which sought to "track chromosomal anomalies as errors of nature requiring correction," gradually gained traction in France. Concurrently, various far-right political movements continued to assert their affiliation with Alexis Carrel. Gwen Terrenoire posits that the impetus to diverge from eugenic ideology was more pronounced in Germany and the United States than in France. The reality of Nazi eugenics remains largely unknown in France, though it is frequently cited in bioethics debates.

== Analyses of the political failure of eugenic theory in France ==
Eugenics theorists largely failed in their attempts to establish their ideas politically and implement them under the Third Republic.

The reasons for this failure are varied, but they are particularly linked to neo-Lamarckism, fears of depopulation (a pro-natalist movement), and the influence of Catholicism. Humanist doctors opposed their eugenicist counterparts, and French doctors adhered to the tradition of liberal medical practice and rejected interventionism. The application of eugenics in Nazi Germany during the 1930s further discredited the movement, partly due to the historic rivalry with Germany.

=== Depopulation ===
According to the philosopher Jean Gayon, the ease with which eugenics was implemented in other countries can be attributed to different social fears. In the United States, eugenics was linked to immigration, while in England, it was associated with the working classes. In France, however, the primary concern was the health and development of children, which was more compatible with a hygienist intervention policy than with eugenics. Schneider and Taguieff posit that the prevailing concern regarding depopulation represented the primary impediment to the adoption of eugenics measures. In addition, Carol's research underscores how the depopulation that ensued in the aftermath of World War I engendered a societal environment that proved to be incongruent with the pursuit of sterilization and abortion policies. Consequently, the penalization of abortion was further strengthened in 1923, while a series of incentives for parenthood were instituted during the 1930s.

=== Influence of catholicism ===
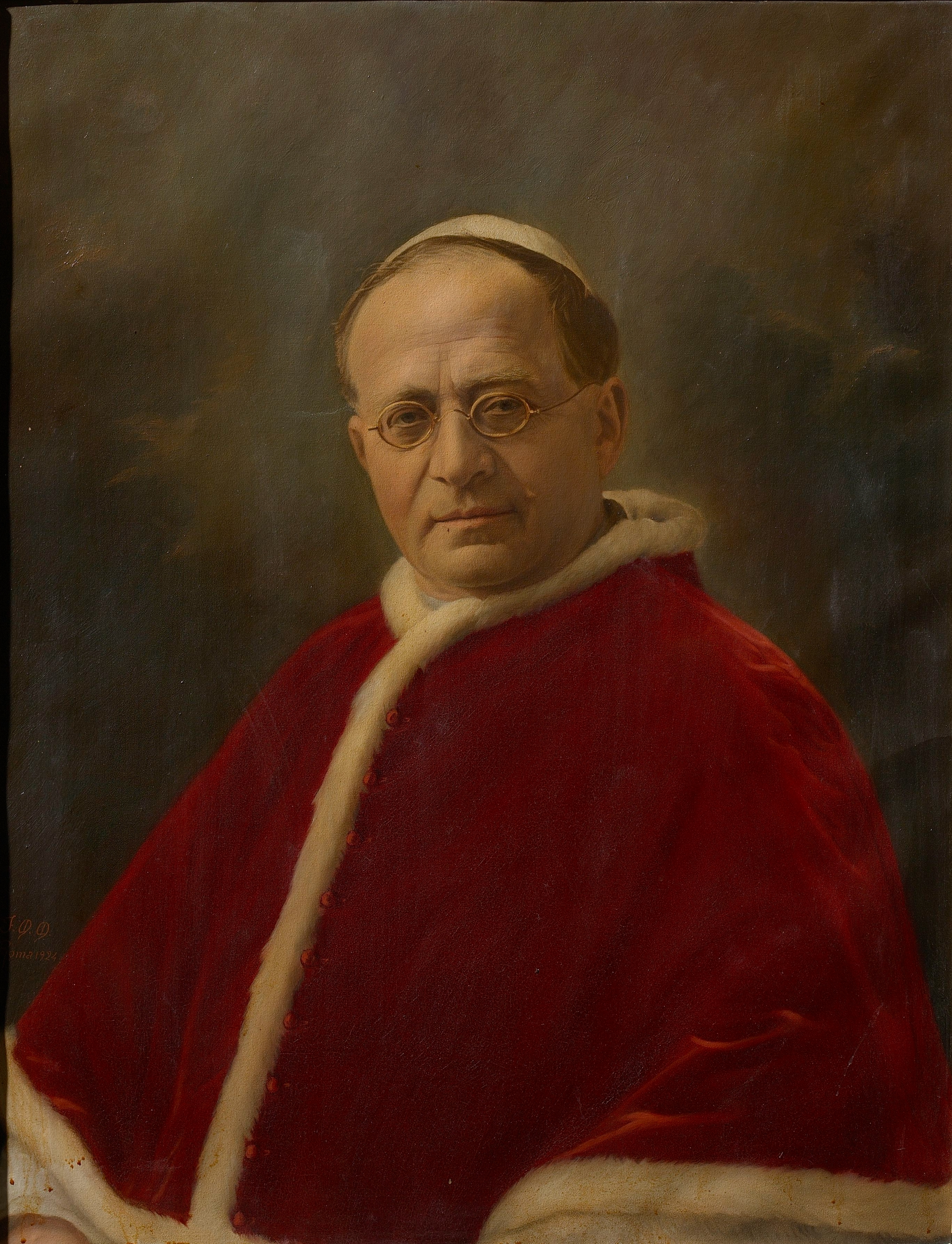
Pope Pius XI condemned eugenics in his Casti connubii, in 1930.

Ethicist Gwen Terrenoire posits that the disaffection of Catholic doctors, who were once regarded as the "first allies" of the French eugenics movement, and the subsequent official condemnation of eugenics by Catholic institutions, largely account for its political failure in France. Pierre-André Taguieff observes that the failure of eugenics is pervasive in all Latin Catholic countries, where Catholicism generally condemns birth control and non-reproductive sexual acts. French doctors align with Catholic values that prioritize family, morality, and social virtues. In contrast, Protestant countries were more receptive to the concept of eugenic sterilization. The emergence of eugenics discourse at the close of the 19th century posed a challenge to Christian moral doctrine, as the Church feared that science would supersede it.

In May 1930, the Christian Marriage Association convened a national congress in Marseille, to deliberate on the relationship between the Church and eugenics. The conclusions of this congress affirmed eugenics, but only under the condition that it served to "ensure the multiplication of humanity" (i.e., "pro-life eugenics"), and firmly condemned birth control. Subsequently, in December 1930, Pope Pius XI officially condemned eugenics in Casti Connubii. This papal condemnation effectively curtailed the potential support that French Catholics might have previously extended to the eugenics ideology. Subsequently, in the following year, the Holy Office issued a similar condemnation, further solidifying the Church's stance on the matter. Jesuit theologian René Brouillard vehemently opposed eugenic sterilization, denouncing it as "absolutely repugnant" in his 1931 Causerie de morale. From 1934 onward, numerous Catholic doctors also voiced their disapproval, denouncing the application of eugenics in Germany.

French Catholics similarly rebuffed the eugenic proposal for a prenuptial examination law. Nevertheless, a handful of marginal figures, including Alexis Carrel, endeavored to harmonize their faith with eugenic convictions. Catholic representatives persisted in their opposition to any manifestation of eugenics and birth selection in France, predicated on the tenet of the sanctity of human life.

== Main theorists of historical eugenics ==
Pierre-André Taguieff and science historian Patrick Tort identify two primary proponents of historical eugenic ideology in France: Charles Richet and Alexis Carrel. Tort also contends that these two figures should not overshadow the sustained advocacy of eugenics after World War II by prominent figures such as Jean Rostand.

=== Georges Vacher de Lapouge ===
Georges Vacher de Lapouge is recognized as the inaugural theorist and propagandist of eugenics in France. He introduced a doctrine that integrated elements of Darwinism, socialism, and Aryanism, a term denoting racial prejudice. Vacher de Lapouge conceptualized eugenics as a social science and was the first to disseminate the ideas of Francis Galton. Through his publications in Revue d'anthropologie, he introduced the terms "eugenic" and "eugenics," and subsequently promoted his theories based on social Darwinism, notably in his 1896 book Les Sélections Sociales. In this work, he advocated for the selective reproduction of certain physical traits, such as those exhibited by the Aryan, dolichocephalic, and blonde populations. He theorized that this "elite" group would serve to "perpetuate the race," effectively replacing "inferior races" with "superior races." Vacher de Lapouge regarded eugenics as the sole means to avert potential interracial conflicts. However, his views were met with skepticism due to his perceived pro-German stance, which led to his marginalization within France. Vacher de Lapouge initially developed his theory without being privy to the principles of Mendelian genetics. The racist premise on which he based his ideas was scientifically discredited by 1935.

The anthropo-sociology movement he created later influenced Charles Richet and Alexis Carrel.

=== Adolphe Pinard ===
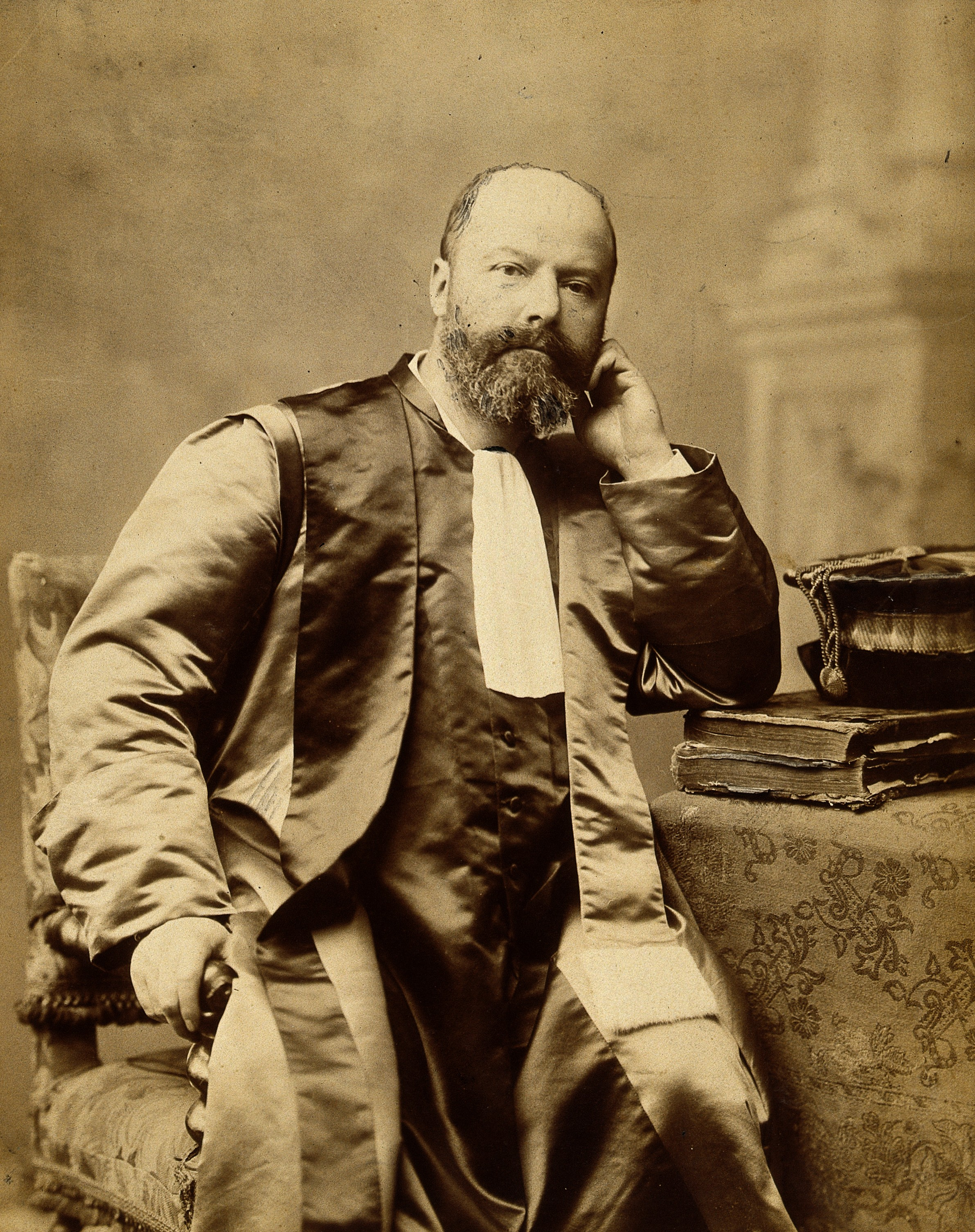
Adolphe Pinard, from a photograph by Pierre Petit.

Adolphe Pinard, a founding vice-president of the SFE, emerged as a prominent proponent of a "positive" and natalist eugenic ideology. He reinterpreted the concept of puericulture (childcare) as part of an "ambitious project of medical control over procreation," to exert influence over the child from the moment of conception. Pinard, who concurrently held the position of deputy, undertook the initiative of assembling a cadre of SFE-affiliated medical professionals to develop a certification program, the objective of which was to empower these individuals with substantial regulatory authority over marital unions and the selection of prospective parents. The proposed legislation, introduced by Pinard in 1926, was never deliberated in the Chamber of Deputies.

=== Charles Richet ===
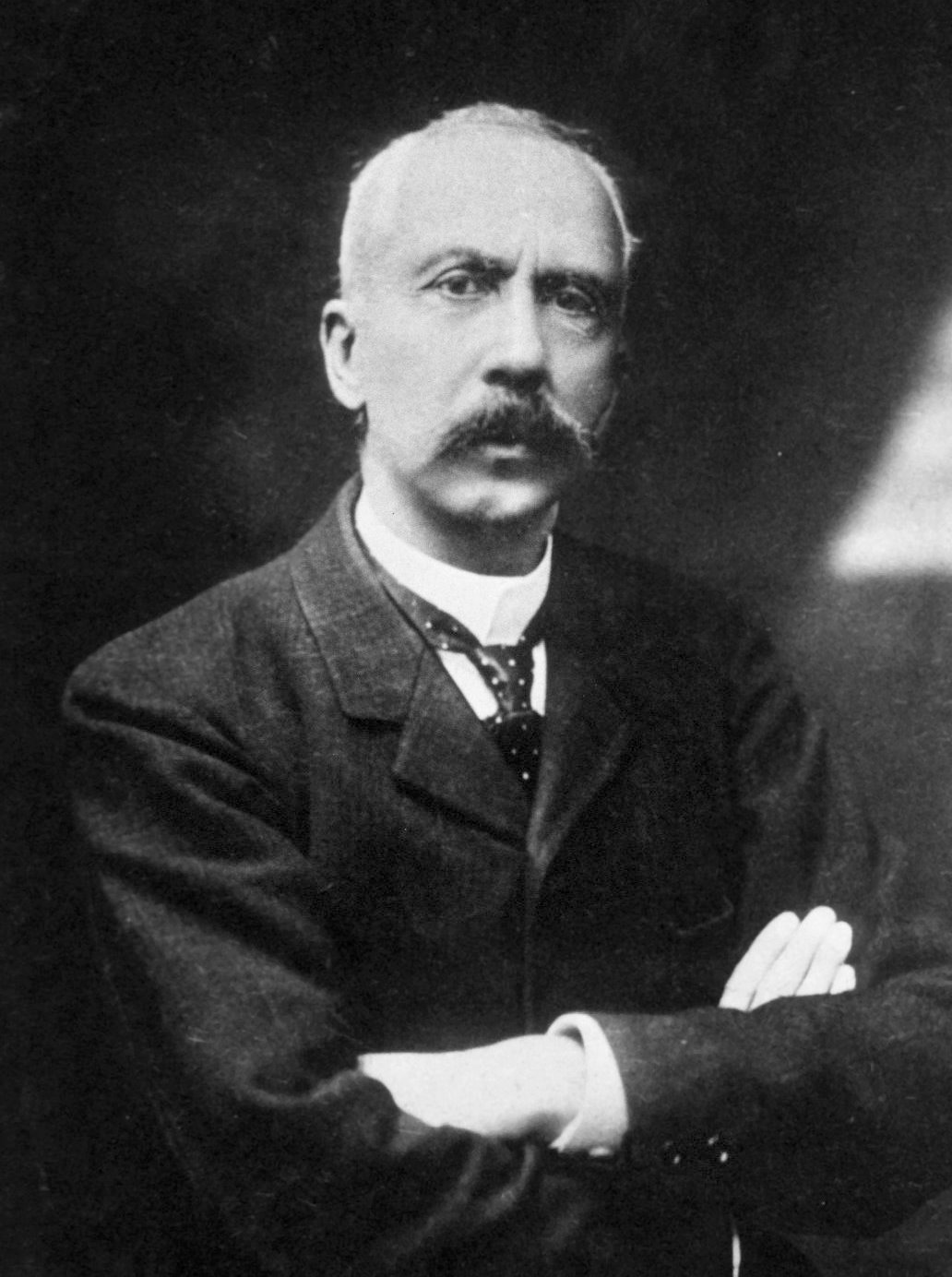
Charles Richet, winner of the Nobel Prize for Medicine in 1913, and President of the French Eugenics Society from 1920 to 1926.

In 1913, Charles Richet published ‘’La Sélection humaine’’, a text that has been characterized as one of the "most violently eugenic" works ever published in France. In this work, Richet advanced several controversial proposals, including the execution of "abnormal children," the prohibition of marriage for the "incurable" and other "degenerates," the deportation of the dysgenics to Corsica or Ireland, and the implementation of forced sterilizations:

The first step in selection is the elimination of the abnormal. By resolutely proposing the suppression of the abnormal, I will certainly offend the sensitivities of our time. I will be called a monster because I prefer healthy children to sickly ones, and I see no social necessity in keeping these sickly children alive. [...] There is bad living material that deserves no respect or compassion. Eliminating them decisively would be doing them a service, for they can only lead miserable lives.

— Charles Richet, La Sélection humaine

He also defends a racist ideology, decrying the mixing of "superior human races with inferior human races." In his 1922 article La Sélection humaine, he lists a long list of individuals to be excluded: "too tall, too short, hunchbacked, lame, weak, ugly, born criminals, epileptics, lazy, clumsy..."

=== Charles Binet-Sanglé ===
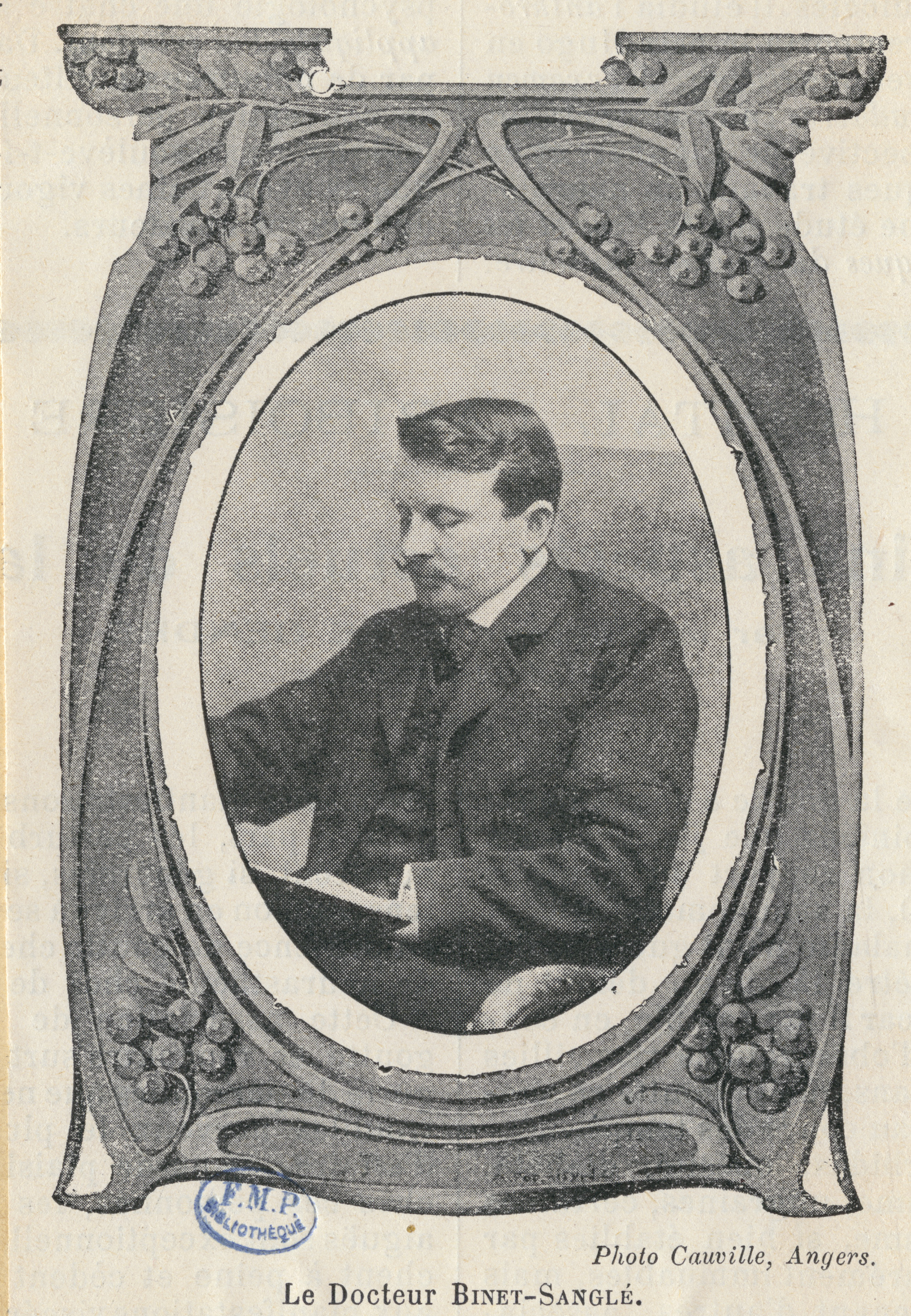
Charles Binet-Sanglé, from a photograph of Cauville.

In L'Art de mourir, Charles Binet-Sanglé advanced a defense of suicide and proposed a technique for its execution. Specifically, he advocated for the use of gassing on individuals deemed to be "deformed," following a period of persuasion regarding their perceived social harm. In 1918, Binet-Sanglé proposed the establishment of a "human stud farm," a concept aimed at facilitating the impregnation of 103 women annually by elite reproductive men. This proposal was met with ridicule and mockery in the press.

=== Alexis Carrel ===
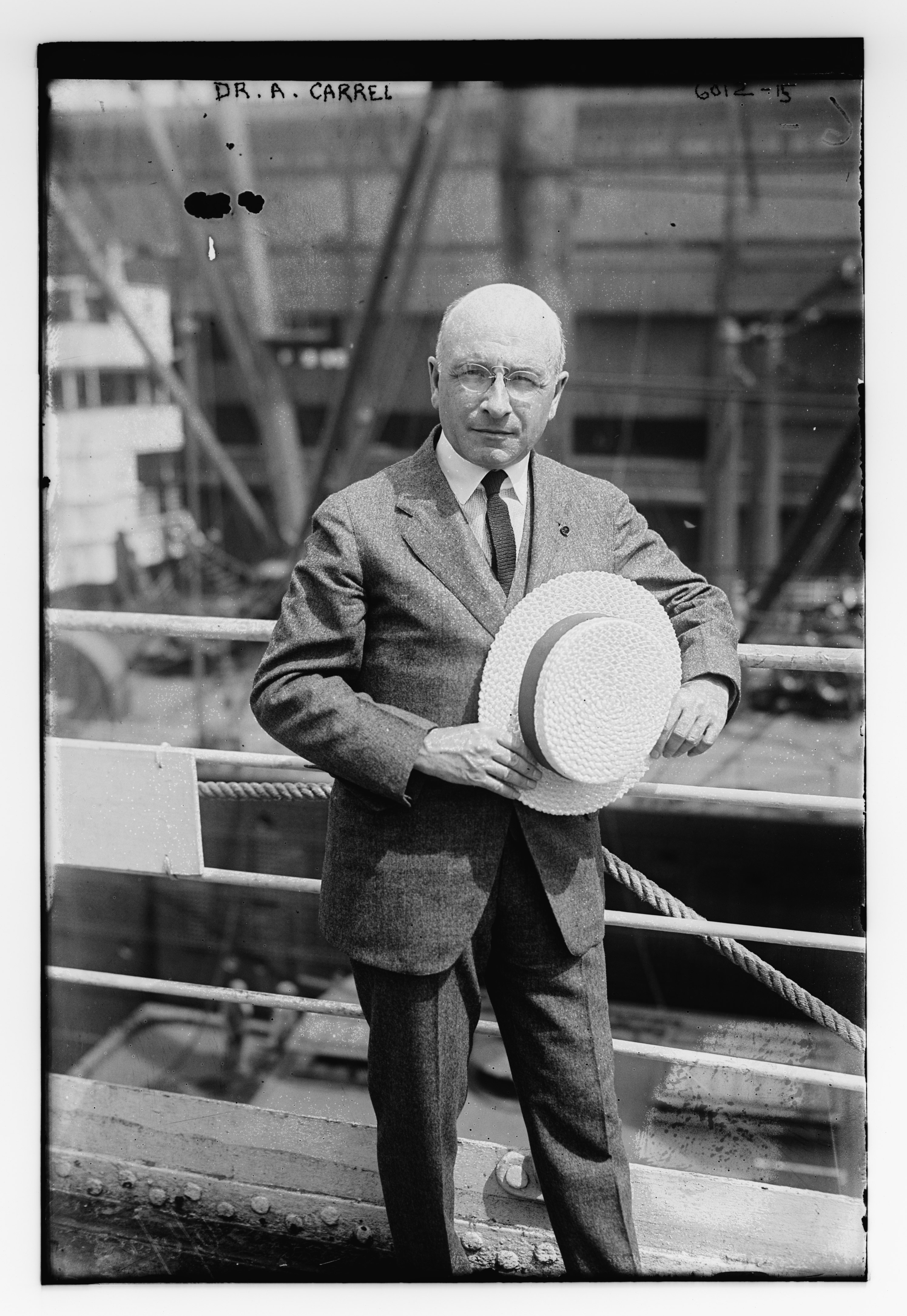
Alexis Carrel, France's leading eugenics theorist after 1941.

Alexis Carrel, awarded the 1912 Nobel Prize in Medicine, gained significant influence and notoriety. Influenced by American ideas, he advocated for the establishment of a voluntary eugenic aristocracy. In his 1935 work Man, The Unknown, Carrel proposed the gassing of criminals and the mentally ill. This book, a major success in France, was translated into approximately twenty languages:

A naive effort is made by civilized nations to preserve useless and harmful beings. Abnormals hinder the development of normals. It is necessary to face this problem.

— Alexis Carrel, Man, The Unknown

For Carrel, confronting the issue entailed the implementation of a form of "salvational eugenics," which entailed the state's interventionist role, guided by the principles of medicine and biology. Carrel was among the first to introduce transhumanist concepts such as "biocracy" and "androtechnics," advocating for the elimination of tens of thousands of individuals considered to be detrimental to humanity's future through forced sterilization or euthanasia. Carrel's philosophical standpoint was characterized by an exclusive focus on what he considered to be the "normal" man—in both biological and moral terms—as being deserving of inclusion in society.

The demise of the subject in November 1944 effectively insulated him from allegations of collaboration. During the 1990s, a concerted effort was initiated by researchers, associations, and political parties to rename French streets that had been dedicated to Alexis Carrel, citing his eugenic perspectives. This initiative frequently invoked the reductio ad Hitlerum argument.

=== Jean Sutter ===
Dr. Jean Sutter, a renowned figure in the field of population genetics, was a disciple of Alexis Carrel and a former collaborator of the French Foundation for the Study of Human Problems. In 1946, Sutter published an article titled The Quality Factor in Demography, which was followed by his seminal 1950 book Eugenics: Problems, Methods, and Results. This publication coincided with the Nuremberg trials of Nazi doctors, a significant event in the history of medicine and society. In this book, Sutter criticized Nazi ideology, asserted the disappearance of eugenics as a scientific methodology, and its survival as an ideology, while avoiding the term "race" and preferring "population."

=== Jean Rostand ===
Despite the probable awareness of Nazi Germany's eugenics practices, the biologist and philosopher Jean Rostand published the following in 1953:

[...] One may wonder if, sooner or later, humanity will not take control of its physical and moral progress by practicing on itself an 'artificial selection' similar to what it applies to domestic animals when aiming to reinforce traits deemed advantageous. Whether through negative eugenics, by eliminating the defective, or positive eugenics, by favoring the reproduction of the best, the collective conscience remains quite resistant. For now, any control over human reproduction would provoke social discomfort disproportionate to any potential benefit. It is possible, however, that in the future, such scruples may weaken. Undoubtedly, a 'eugenic awareness' is forming, and humans will gradually come to illuminate their sense of responsibility toward their offspring or the species.

— Jean Rostand, What I Believe

Patrick Tort's interpretation of this text is that it firmly established the notion of distinguishing between desirable eugenics and criminal eugenics, the latter of which is associated with Nazi atrocities.

== Since the 1990s ==
The discourse surrounding eugenics underwent a resurgence in the 1990s, coinciding with significant advancements in molecular biology and biotechnology. A substantial portion of this discourse revolves around divergent interpretations of the term "eugenics." Historically, eugenics was founded on racist principles, positing heredity and the biological incompatibility of social classes—two concepts that have since been wholly repudiated.

According to the definition of eugenics as a practice aimed at optimizing the human genetic heritage, none of the contemporary biotechnologies can be classified as such. However, if the definition is broadened to encompass the control of human reproduction to avert the birth of children with medical conditions or disabilities, then the aforementioned biotechnologies can be considered eugenic. Physician Jacques Milliez contends that any practice involving the selection of human beings before birth constitutes a eugenic approach and that contemporary thinking has introduced a distinction between two forms of eugenics. The first form is deemed unacceptable, having been implemented by the Nazis and considered a criminal act. The second form is regarded as a medical act and is considered morally acceptable. In contrast, Henri Atlan reserves the term "eugenics" for practices before 1945. The debate also encompasses the question of the unity and continuity between the historical, authoritarian form of eugenics and modern medical practices.

=== Perruche case ===
The Perruche case is a protracted legal proceeding involving Nicolas Perruche, a child born in 1989 with severe disabilities resulting from rubella contracted by his mother. This case has ignited a discourse surrounding the notion of "prejudice of being born," ableism, and eugenics. The Perruche ruling established that a disabled child could be subject to prejudice due to their birth and be deemed a medical error. This ruling has been interpreted by some authors as a form of encouragement regarding abortion. In particular, it has been suggested that specialists in prenatal diagnosis may be prompted to recommend medical termination of pregnancy "at the slightest doubt regarding the normality of the child."

=== Ban on forced sterilizations ===
The question of the possibility of sterilizing people with mental disabilities has repeatedly arisen in France, with such requests almost always originating from a third party, typically a parent. In 1994, the European Union prohibited any irreversible harm to the reproductive organs of individuals, a prohibition that was incorporated into the French Civil Code during the same period. While forced sterilization was imposed in various countries in the early 20th century for eugenic reasons, the motivations of parents requesting it at the end of the 20th century in France are not based on eugenics. However, the French Association of Handicap People (APF) denounced the lack of a clear ban on these practices in 1996 and 1997, stating that "each adjustment with ethics is ultimately a further step toward de facto eugenics. The recent history of eugenics should nonetheless make us vigilant."

A survey conducted in Gironde reveals that, in the 1990s, one in three mentally disabled women underwent sterilization, with a further two in three residing in specialized care facilities. In 1997, the satirical newspaper Charlie Hebdo reported, citing researcher Nicole Dietrich, that 15,000 women in French institutions for mentally disabled individuals had been sterilized under duress, either at the request of their families or on the initiative of the institution's medical staff. Therefore, the practice of sterilizing mentally disabled individuals has been "largely tolerated" in France, due to issues of managing promiscuity and sexuality in specialized facilities:

Thus, in France, sterilizations of mentally disabled women are a reality.

— Catherine Bachelard-Jobard, Eugenics, Science, and Law

Following the enactment of the Law of 4 July 2001, which imposed stringent regulations on the practice, and despite the absence of an official assessment since that time, a 2006 La Croix survey indicated that "illegal sterilizations appear to be improbable." Nevertheless, it remains feasible for parents to undergo this procedure in a foreign nation where it is permissible. While the cited rationale is ostensibly the well-being of the disabled individual, in practice, the procedure is more frequently undertaken for the convenience of the parents or the institution that has assumed their care.

=== Liberal eugenics ===
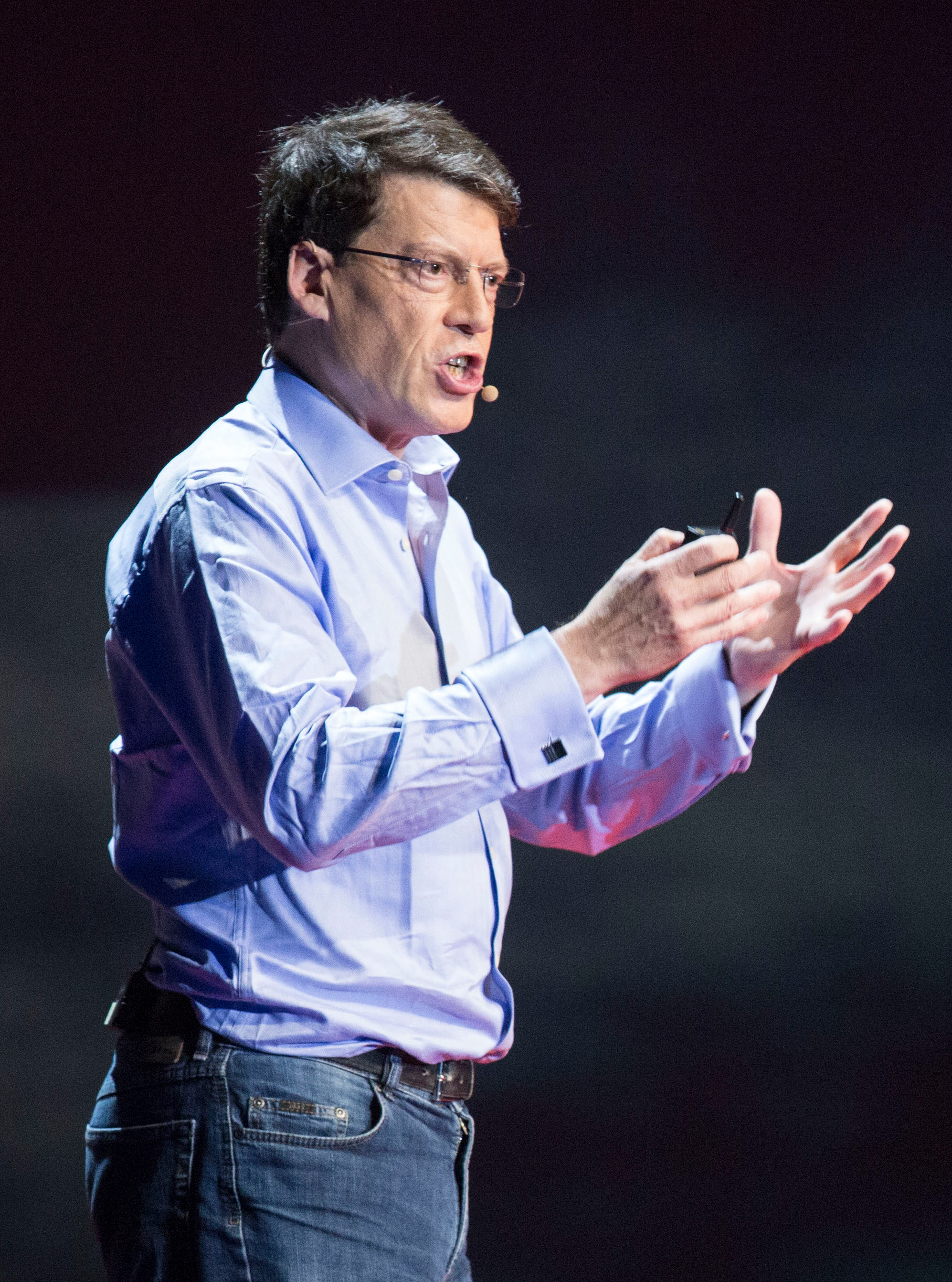
Laurent Alexandre promotes transhumanism and the use of liberal eugenics.

The concept of a novel form of eugenics, occasionally referred to as "liberal eugenics," is predicated on the autonomy of parents to elect to deliver a child, or not, if said child is identified as potentially disabled or ill before birth. According to the French philosopher Jean Gayon, this "new eugenics" emerges from the convergence of advancements in prenatal screening techniques and the decriminalization of abortion, which enables pregnant French women to terminate their pregnancy if a "serious, proven or presumed anomaly" is detected in the fetus.

More than with fashion trends, the freedom space for citizens will be very limited if it becomes possible to choose one's child: who wants to procreate a child with Down's syndrome? Who prefers a small, asthmatic, or myopic child? It is easier to accept a social norm than to demand difference, especially when it concerns a child for whom one already feels responsible.

— Jacques Testart

Ethics professor Gregory Katz-Bénichou posits that "the nascent orthogenics of the 21st century extends the eugenic theses of previous centuries." He asserts the existence of an uninterrupted lineage between the historical eugenic ideology espoused by Georges Vacher de Lapouge and the preventive medicine of the 21st century, particularly concerning the establishment of a medical boundary between the normal and the pathological. This boundary is often conflated with a moral boundary between what is considered good (normal) and what is regarded as bad (abnormal). This conflation results in the elimination of the abnormal being perceived as morally acceptable. Jacques Milliez postulates a continuity between the writings of Charles Richet, who advocated for the "elimination of the abnormal," and the arguments justifying medical abortion for disability or illness, despite a difference in intentionality. In contrast, Pierre-André Taguieff argues that eugenics is inherently incompatible with liberalism.

Jurist Catherine Bachelard-Jobard posits that the question of whether modern medical practices are eugenic "seems unsolvable." She asserts that the issues involved pertain more to clarifying the concepts of normality, severity (of illness or disability), quality of life, exclusion and discrimination, the place of disabled people, the possibility of giving birth to a disabled child, and finally, the protection of the embryo.

During the 2010s, a technophilic discourse inspired by eugenics and marked by an advocacy for new technologies capable of manipulating living beings emerged within the French public sphere. Noted urologist-surgeon Laurent Alexandre has been a vocal proponent of genetic selection, citing Israel as a paradigm of a "eugenic country" that has successfully eradicated Tay-Sachs disease as an example. Gaïa Lassaube, a sociology PhD student, has critiqued Alexandre's arguments, labeling them as "pseudoscientific," and suggesting that they serve to "liberate a relaxed eugenic discourse." In his column titled "Gifted Women Have Fewer Children," published in L'Express on 31 January 2018, Laurent Alexandre advocated for easier access to gamete preservation and assisted reproductive technology for women with doctorates. This column was heavily criticized by child psychiatrist Patrick Ben Soussan, who compared Alexandre's transhumanist ideas to those of Francis Galton.

== Legislation ==
The concept of eugenics was introduced in the French law of 29 July 1994, the first French bioethics law, in the section concerning respect for human bodies (Chapter III, Section I, Article L 511-1). The adoption of this law sparked long debates aimed at defining the concept of eugenics in a way that would prevent its abuses while not hindering biomedical research. This law was revised in 2003, with the 214-1 amendment to Article 28 of Book II of the criminal code, adopted as part of the bioethics law, which introduced the notion of "eugenics crime." The current Penal Code addresses the issue of eugenics in Subtitle II of Title I, Book II, entitled "Crimes Against the Human Species":

- Article L 214-1: "The implementation of a eugenic practice aimed at organizing the selection of people is punishable by thirty years of criminal imprisonment and a fine of 7.5 million euros."
- Article L 214-3: "This penalty is increased to life imprisonment and a fine of 7.5 million euros when committed in an organized group."

The Civil Code, Article 16-4, states that "no one can harm the integrity of the human species. Any eugenic practice aimed at organizing the selection of people is prohibited." European laws (European Bioethics Convention) and texts from supranational organizations (UNESCO) influence French bioethics laws, although they are not legally binding. The National Consultative Ethics Committee (CCNE) is regularly consulted.

Although the prohibition of eugenics appears to be solemn and unquestionable, the French position is more ambiguous. French law also provides incentives and legal exceptions to avoid giving birth to children with malformations or presumed disabilities.

The legislation under scrutiny prohibits the implementation of collective eugenic selection, yet it does not extend to the prohibition of eugenic ideology or individual eugenic practices. Catherine Bachelard-Jobard posits the hypothesis that the legislation may be aimed at Galtonian and Nazi eugenics, that is, state-planned selection, a scenario that would be difficult to implement in France. She concludes that "The scope of this principle text is ultimately very limited. The legislator articulates a principle that prohibits state eugenics, while permitting all prevailing practices, contingent upon the autonomy of parents and their aspiration to procreate a healthy offspring." The formulation "organization of the selection of people" is strategically employed to forestall any conflation of the practice of medical abortion (IMG) with eugenics. Moreover, the concept of "protection of the genetic heritage of humanity" is devoid of any constitutional significance.

== Ethical questions regarding disability or illness ==
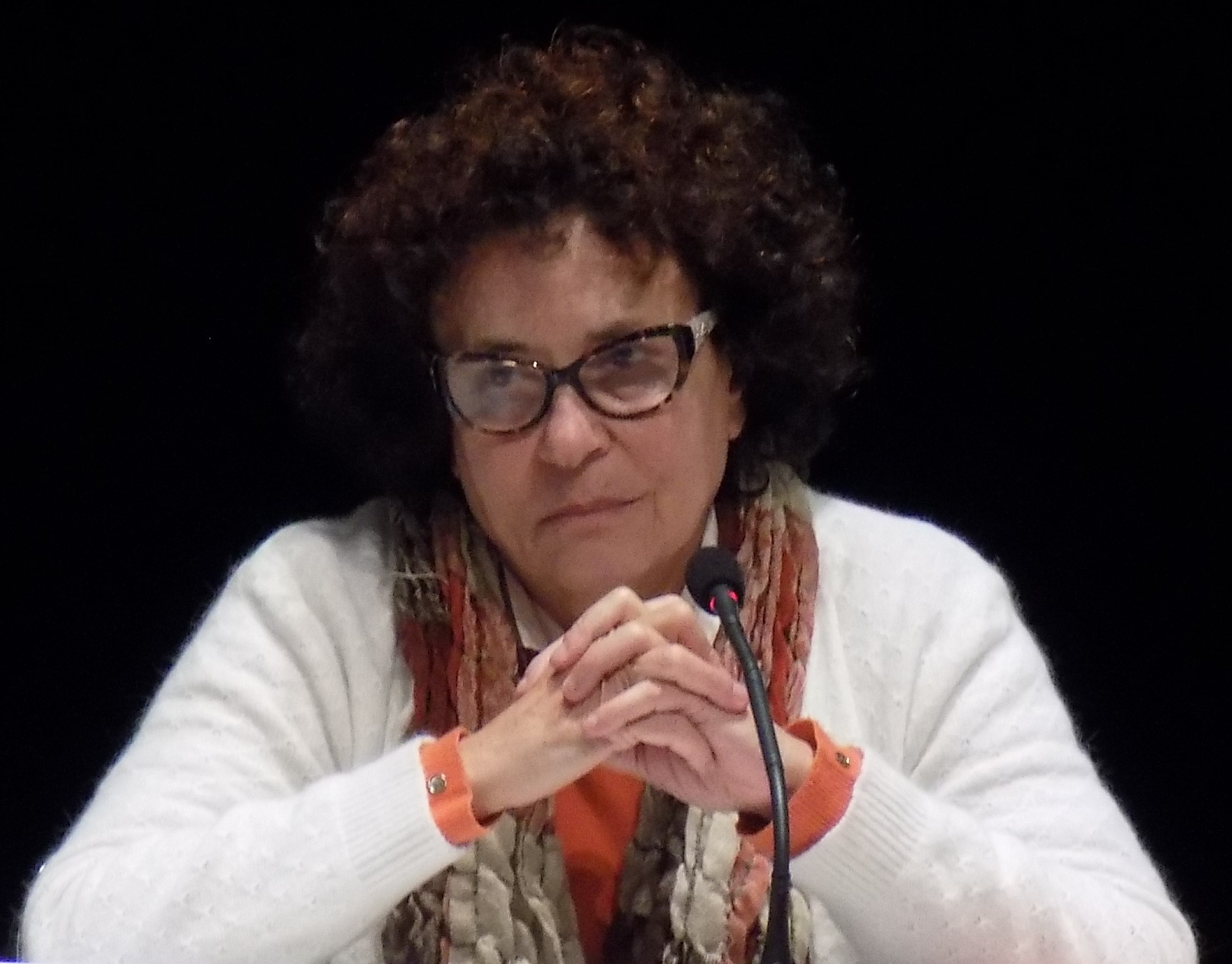
Lawyer Marie-Angèle Hermitte (pictured here in 2015), member of the French National Consultative Ethics Committee (CCNE).

The fundamental inquiries concerning contemporary eugenic hazards are contingent upon the establishment of criteria to delineate between what is "normal" and "pathological," in addition to the societal rejection of those deemed abnormal. A further inquiry pertains to the universal consideration of certain mutated genes within the human species as defective and therefore subject to elimination, given the potential for genetic diseases to confer a situational selective advantage. It is imperative to acknowledge the inherently subjective nature of these definitions (disability, normality, etc.).

According to the bioethics study published by the French Council of State in 2009, eugenics "can also be the collective result of a series of converging individual decisions made by future parents, in a society where the search for the 'perfect child,' or at least one free from many serious afflictions, prevails." Doctor in law (CNRS) Marie-Angèle Hermitte discusses the creation of criteria for the legitimacy of abortion defined in prenatal screening centers in France, which anthropologist Charles Gardou describes as "the broad outlines of a doctrine of tolerable or desirable eugenics." For Gregory Katz-Bénichou, "Everyone will opt for the advantage of eugenic exemption. Theoretically, the choice remains individual, but in practice, it tends to become collective and systematic […]. 21st-century eugenics spreads in a peaceful medico-parental consent, protected by democratic values."

French law aims to limit eugenics by applying birth selection only to embryos with 'serious diseases.' But what is a 'serious disease'? How should the disabling nature of a pathology be ranked? By reserving eugenic practices only for 'diseases of particular gravity,' French law seeks to introduce a firm restriction on normative abuses. But doesn't it, on the contrary, introduce an elastic concept that time and customs will eventually stretch?

— Gregory Katz-Bénichou, L'inepte et l'inapte

French society's acceptance of birth selection, a practice aimed at avoiding certain genetic disorders and disabilities, such as Down syndrome, Duchenne muscular dystrophy, and cystic fibrosis, has given rise to a series of profound ethical questions. Among these is the potential extension of this practice to other diseases or disabilities in the future. Additionally, it has led to inquiries into the expectations of future parents regarding medical interventions, particularly the demand for embryo selection based on predetermined criteria, such as the prevention of diseases like asthma or diabetes. This ethical question also touches on the association between happiness and health, the hypothesis that an individual without disease or disability would, by nature, be happy, potentially leading to practices such as embryo selection and the euthanasia of elderly individuals. Finally, eugenic birth selection based on the search for normality raises the question of its compatibility with the very notion of natural selection, since the regular birth of "abnormal" individuals constitutes the norm in the absence of medical interventions.

Another salient question in the French discourse on eugenics is economic. In January 1994, the High Council of Public Health articulated its position on the matter, stating, "A cost-benefit analysis, when it merely contrasts the collective cost of amniocentesis and karyotyping with the cost of caring for disabled children who would not have been screened — and under the assumption that a positive diagnosis is always followed by medical abortion — shows that prenatal diagnostic (DPN) activity is fully justified for the community."

=== Down syndrome ===
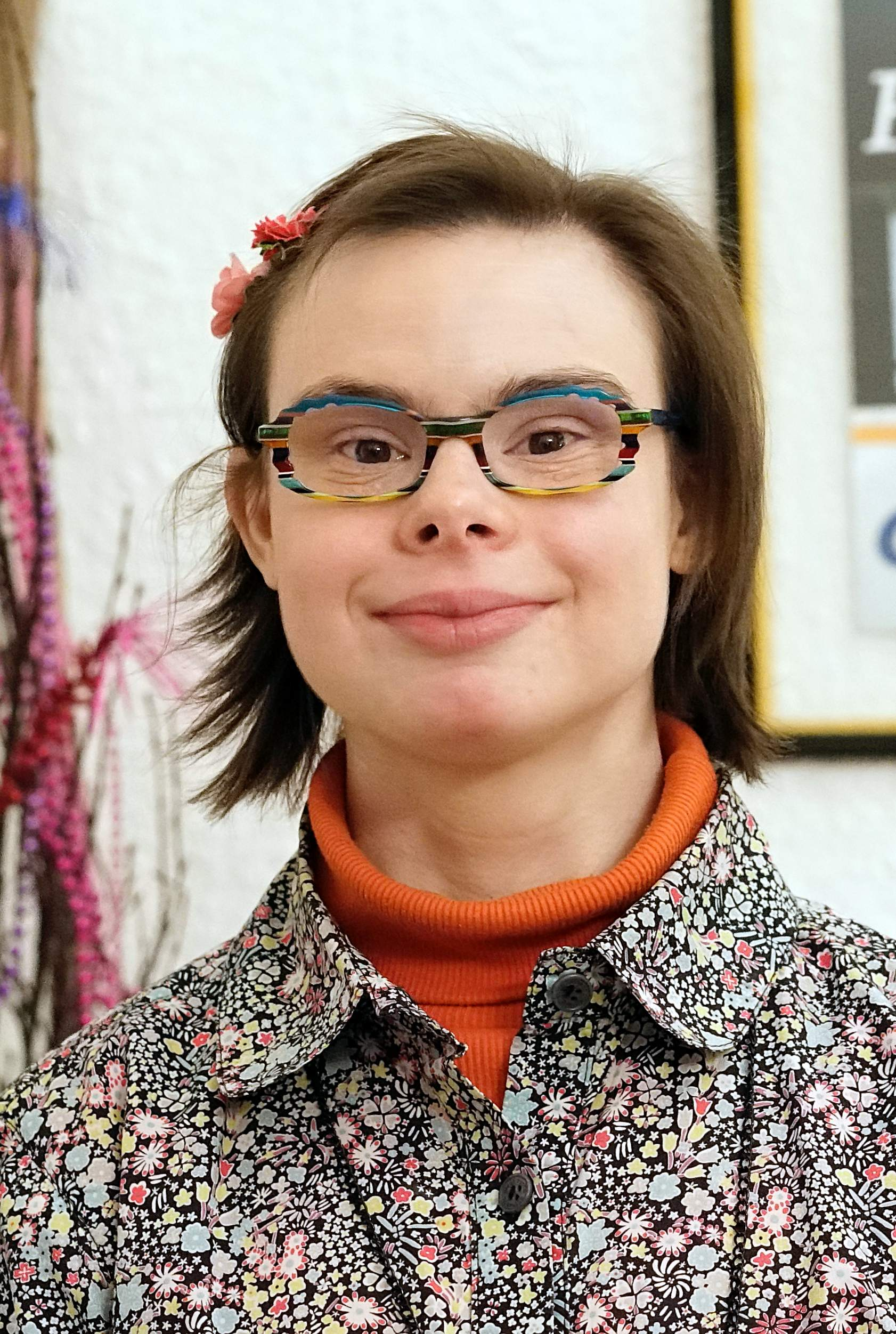
Éléonore Laloux, a French activist and politician with Down syndrome, politically involved in the revision of bioethics laws.

A social debate has emerged surrounding the ethical implications of screening for Down syndrome in France, with concerns that it could constitute negative eugenics. In his 18 October 1996 progress report, ‘’Screening for Down syndrome using maternal serum markers’’, Jean-François Mattei stated that pregnant women undergoing Down syndrome screening may enter a medical pathway with unclear implications and potentially unbeknownst to them. Unless they explicitly consent to an abortion, the procedure may take on an "eugenic essence, even under the guise of the doctor's desire to do good." When the future mother is adequately informed of the non-obligatory nature of screening and the option of pregnancy termination, this screening for Down syndrome is regarded as not having a eugenic objective.

In 2009, two decrees were issued, followed by the 2011 revision of the bioethics law in July. These legal developments led to the incorporation of the obligation for healthcare professionals to inform pregnant women about the existence of Down syndrome screening into French law. This screening is systematically offered in a social context of the growing acceptability of medical abortion, both among healthcare professionals and the general population.

==== Evolution of births of children with Down syndrome ====
The number of births of children with Down syndrome is challenging to estimate due to the fragmented nature of the data. According to F. Goujard, the average number of births decreased from 800 to 900 children in 1990 to an average of 500 to 600 children in 2001, following the adoption of the nuchal translucency and serum markers diagnostic method. This change represented a reduction of approximately one-third in births. According to Gregory Katz-Bénichou, in 1999, 1,335 trisomic fetuses were aborted (95% of those screened), 357 children with Down syndrome were born, including 287 who were not screened, and 70 from couples who chose to give birth to a child diagnosed with Down syndrome (5%). In 2009, France had the highest abortion rate for Down syndrome detection in Europe. During the 2018 bioethics debates, Professor Israel Nisand mentioned 22 births of children with Down syndrome in Alsace and stated that approximately 2,000 embryos or fetuses with Down syndrome are detected each year, and more than 96% of these pregnancies are terminated. In 2020, individuals with Down syndrome in France, encountering difficulties in locating peers, perceived themselves to be victims of eugenics.

==== Positions taken ====
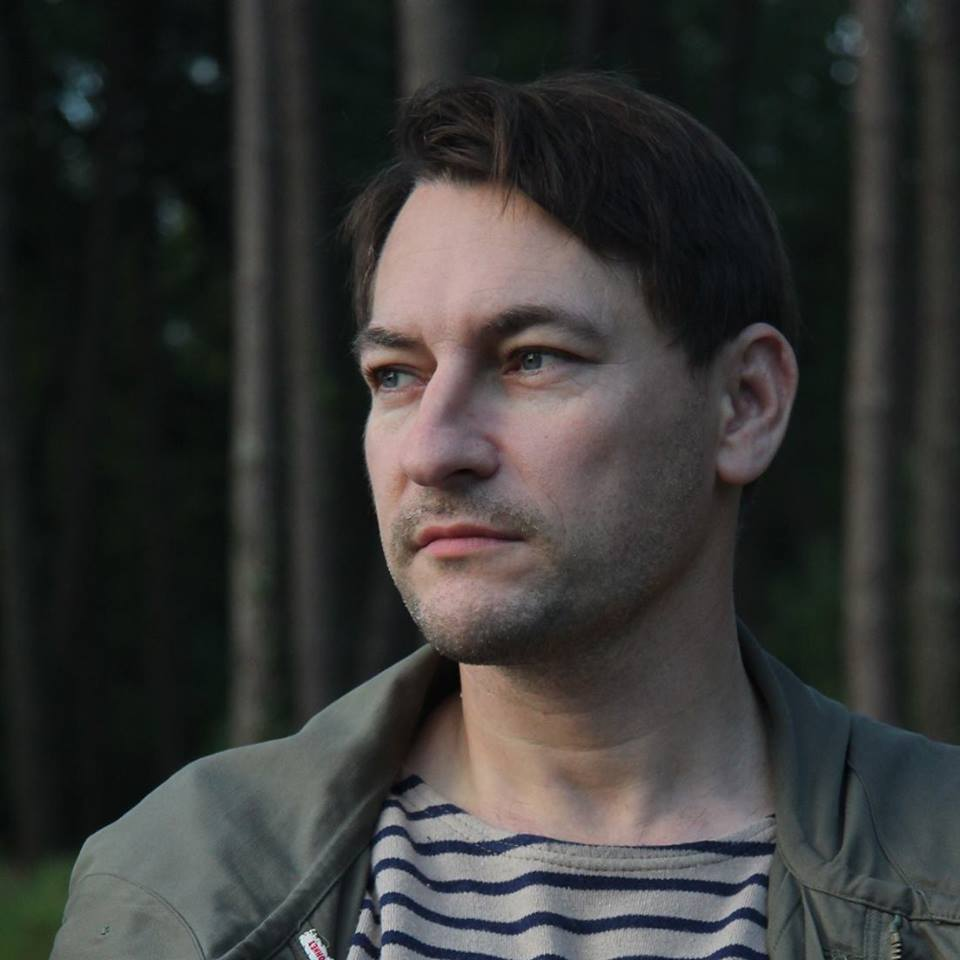
Bruno Deniel-Laurent accuses France of organizing "state eugenics" against Trisomy 21.

A variety of associations and public figures have articulated their perspectives on France's policy concerning Down syndrome. The intricacies of this discourse are further compounded by the political and religious commitments of the primary actor, the Jérôme-Lejeune Foundation. This foundation asserts that France is "at the forefront of eugenics" due to its bioethical legislation, which it contends results in "the elimination of an entire population of individuals selected based on their genome," a practice that it deems synonymous with the very definition of eugenics.

"It is impossible to avoid the Lejeune Foundation when working on the subject of Down syndrome [...] with its eternal obsession: abortion, prenatal tests [...] the rhetoric of the pro-life far-right, its inappropriate comparisons, frequently made in speeches, to the Nazi Reich’s Aktion T4 program for the elimination of the disabled," says Yann Barte critically in Les Triso, les Catho, Éléonore et moi.

For jurist Catherine Bachelard-Jobard, in the context of screening and reducing the birth of children with Down syndrome, "we are undoubtedly very close to the definition of eugenics." Jacques Milliez refers to a "doubtful eugenics," as systematic screening aims to "eliminate a targeted human category." Israel Nisand declares that he is "not far from thinking that France is practicing state-sponsored eugenics in this regard."

According to Gregory Katz-Bénichou, "eugenics is gradually gaining ground in a biomedicine ensuring the filtering of births," and "this diagnosis, which was meant to remain individual and freely consented to by the future mother, has transformed into mass screening whose systematic logic leads mothers to abort nearly all trisomic fetuses." Writer Bruno Deniel-Laurent argues, in his work Éloge des phénomènes, that this situation constitutes "state-sponsored eugenics" against people with Down syndrome. For Jacques Testart, who calls it a "sly and consensual desire for eugenics," it "reveals a growing intolerance among populations towards physical or mental marginalities grouped under the term 'disabilities'." Physician Didier Sicard adds that "parents who wish for the birth of these children must, in addition to the suffering associated with the disability, expose themselves to the community's judgment and a form of social cruelty born from the fact that they did not accept the proposal made by science and ratified by law."

=== Short stature ===
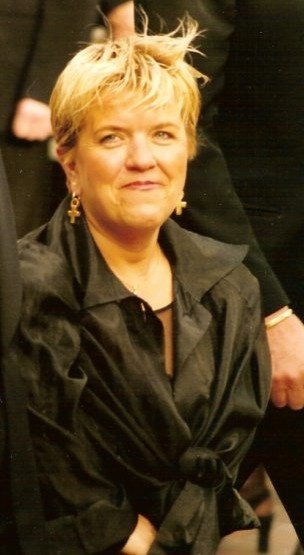
Mimie Mathy, French personality with achondroplasia.

In 1996, the French physician Pierre Maroteaux published a scathing critique of eugenics as it pertains to individuals with short stature. In his article, Maroteaux compellingly argued that the prevailing societal attitudes concerning height, weight, and social status have led to a situation where individuals who do not conform to these standards face significant challenges, including the denial of basic rights. In her 1997 thesis, Corinne Assouline observes that the detection of pseudoachondroplasia, a condition marked by very short stature and a distinctive facial appearance without intellectual disability, is accepted in 80% of cases as grounds for medical abortion. This practice gives rise to ethical concerns, as the primary motivations for abortion are aesthetic (morphotype), which could potentially result in "complete eradication." In 2001, philosopher Alain Etchegoyen highlighted the widespread prescription of growth hormones to children with a form of dwarfism, a practice that he argued was influenced by advertising and eugenic drift in France.

=== Congenital deafness ===
Psychoanalyst André Meynard challenges the notion of liberal eugenics about individuals born deaf. He contends that selective abortion and the use of cochlear implants after birth can lead to the gradual extinction of individuals whose first language is sign language. This phenomenon, he argues, can be viewed as a form of eugenics that favors the extinction of non-verbal individuals and the predominance of those who can speak.

== Ethical and legal questions by medical technique ==
Since the mid-20th century, there has been an increasing medicalization of pregnancies and births in France. France has been recognized as the first country to adopt genetic science as a tool to assist in procreation, through the use of medically assisted reproduction (MAR), which facilitates the selection of sperm donors. Jacques Testart, a vocal critic of the eugenic implications of certain medical techniques, particularly preimplantation genetic diagnosis (PGD), has long warned against the role of doctors and scientists as mere "executors of the normative fantasy." This position contrasts with that of Pierre-André Taguieff, who opposes eugenics based on a divergent definition of the term.

=== Prenatal diagnosis / screening (DPN) ===
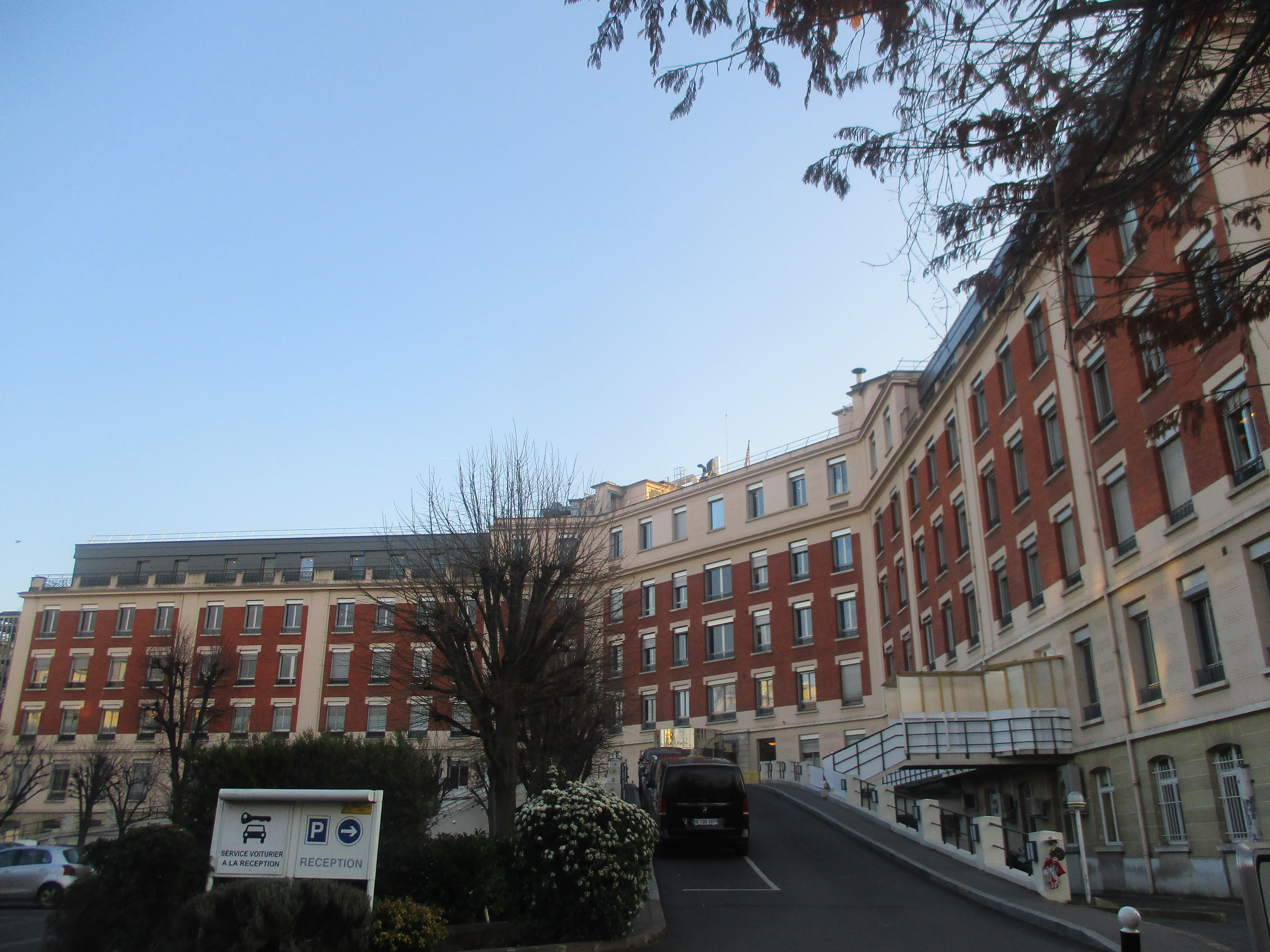
The American Hospital in Paris, whose prenatal diagnosis unit offers screening outside the scope of approval permitted by French law.

According to French law, prenatal diagnosis "aims to detect in utero a serious condition in the embryo or fetus" (Article L. 162-16, first paragraph, in the Public Health Code). This 1994 law excludes personal convenience diagnoses aimed at knowing the characteristics of the unborn child. However, this approach is not without its limitations, as it can result in false positives, leading to diagnoses of diseases or disabilities that are non-existent, and false negatives, failing to detect diseases or disabilities. Jurist Catherine Bachelard-Jobard challenges the eugenic intentions of prenatal diagnosis, asserting that its primary objective is not to enhance the genetic composition of the French population but rather to prevent serious diseases. Nevertheless, it must be acknowledged that this practice also enables the selective birth of children, thereby attaining a eugenic objective.

The amniocentesis technique was introduced in France in the 1970s, with its primary application being the detection of Down syndrome. This development marked a significant revolution in the field of genetic counseling, as it enabled the identification of fetuses suspected of being disabled or diseased before their birth. In the subsequent years, the scope of prenatal screening expanded to encompass a range of additional conditions, including sickle cell disease, thalassemia, hemophilia, Duchenne muscular dystrophy, and fragile X syndrome, among others. Following the diagnosis, a medical abortion is typically offered to the expectant mother.

According to Didier Sicard, president of the National Consultative Ethics Committee in 2007, "The primary objective of prenatal screening is the elimination of fetal anomalies, not their treatment. This underscores a disconcerting prospect: the potential for eradication. This phenomenon may be particularly salient in France compared to other nations."He further elaborates that "in France, the widespread adoption of screening is predicated on the notion of 'proposition,' yet in practice, it has effectively evolved into a near-obligatory procedure." During the 2018 bioethics debates, Israel Nisand, drawing on his experience with prenatal screening, asserted that France is engaging in eugenics to a degree that no other liberal state has previously reached. He further elaborated that this practice is chiefly employed to prevent the birth of children with malformations, of which 50% are considered severe, thereby ensuring the well-being of the population.

In 2013, the prenatal diagnostic unit at the American Hospital of Paris, a private facility, began offering prenatal blood screening for Down syndrome, despite lacking approval from French health authorities. This action has been described by medical journalist Jean-Yves Nau as a form of "democratic eugenics," which he believes accelerated the arrival of a world reminiscent of the film Gattaca. Since at least 2018, the unit has also offered screening for certain mutations associated with autism, followed by a proposed medical abortion for the future mother.

=== Medical abortion (IMG) ===
In France, the regulatory framework surrounding medical abortion (IMG) differs from that of voluntary abortion (IVG). This distinction arises because medical abortion, most commonly initiated following a prenatal diagnosis, is authorized at any point during the pregnancy, as outlined under Article L. 162-12 of the Public Health Code.

According to the views expressed by historian and sociologist Alain Drouard, therapeutic abortion can be considered a form of eugenics.

The decision of future parents to pursue IMG is not driven by eugenic intentions; rather, it is informed by their capacity and readiness to embrace a child with disabilities or health challenges. The eugenic implications emerge as a result of the criteria that influence parents' decisions to opt for IMG, with this choice being shaped by their personal preferences (along with their economic and social circumstances), rather than those of the unborn child. This shift in criteria is evidenced by the increasing number of abortions performed on fetuses deemed to have conditions that do not meet the criteria for severe and incurable diseases, such as cleft lip or limb shortening, which may indicate a form of dwarfism. Additionally, there has been a discernible shift in the use of IMG in cases of curable diseases, such as phenylketonuria.

=== Preimplantation Genetic Diagnosis (PGD) ===
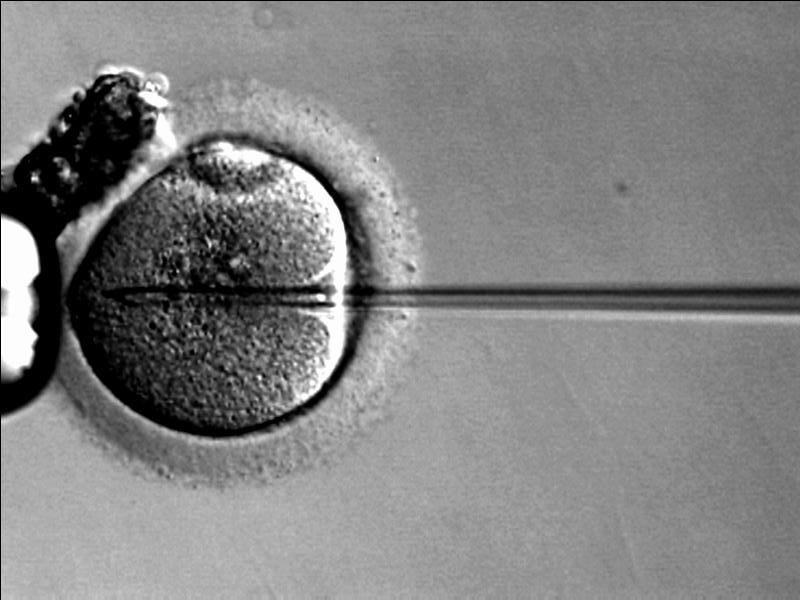
In vitro fertilization by intracytoplasmic sperm injection.

Preimplantation genetic diagnosis (PGD) has been authorized in France since 1994, within a strictly regulated medical framework, for couples at risk of transmitting a genetic disease to their future child. It involves taking one or two cells from an embryo resulting from in vitro fertilization, on the third day. PGD is the medical practice with the most threatening eugenic potential.

According to the Biomedicine Agency, three-quarters of the 918 PGD requests it examined in 2016 were approved, with 774 embryo transfers, 251 pregnancies, and 199 live births.

Deputy Philippe Berta proposed preimplantation screening for aneuploidies (and thus trisomies) during the 2019 bioethics law revision, which sparked debate over its eugenic nature but was not adopted.

=== Selection of gametes ===
Doctors Pierre Jalbert and Georges David have posited that techniques based on sperm and egg donation give rise to a eugenic question, given the selection process that occurs among donors under medical supervision, encompassing factors such as fertility and "genetic quality," with matching criteria. This eugenic question assumes particular relevance in the context of "genetic defects," which result in the exclusion of certain donors. Jacques Testart has characterized this selection as a "practice [that] subtly resumes the improvement project of Galtonian eugenics." The position of the Center for the Study and Conservation of Human Eggs and Sperm (CECOS) in France is to exclude only "serious and incurable diseases."

=== Gene therapy and germline therapy ===
Germline therapy, a procedure that was initially studied and promoted by geneticist Daniel Cohen in 1993 and subsequently by physician Jacques Milliez in 1999, involves the correction of genetic defects directly in the father's sperm. This approach holds the potential for orthogenic effects prior to the sorting of embryos.

=== CRISPR-Cas9 and other genomic engineering tools ===
The recent development of tools for editing the human genome (termed "genetic scissors"), with the most notable example being CRISPR-Cas9, has given rise to a novel ethical concern. These tools could potentially become "privileged instruments for a form of eugenics." Genome editing techniques are particularly associated with "positive" eugenics, enabling the selection of individuals based on the expression of genes associated, for instance, with intelligence.

== See also ==
- Eugenics
- New eugenics
- Prenatal testing
- Disability in France

== Bibliography ==
=== Books ===
- Bachelard-Jobard, Catherine (2001). L'eugénisme, la science et le droit [Eugenics, science and law]. Partage du savoir (in French). Presses Universitaires de France. ISBN 978-2-13-063850-6. OCLC 907647395.
- Carol, Anne (1995). Histoire de l'eugénisme en France : Les médecins et la procréation XIXe – XXe siècles [History of eugenics in France: Doctors and procreation 19th-20th centuries]. L'Univers historique (in French). Paris: Le Seuil.
- Gardou, Charles (2012). Connaître le handicap, reconnaître la personne [Understanding disability, recognizing the person]. Connaissances de la diversité (in French). Toulouse: Eres. ISBN 978-2-7492-2493-0. Archived from the original on 31 December 2024.
- Milliez, Jacques (1999). L'euthanasie du foetus : médecine ou eugénisme ? [Fetal euthanasia: medicine or eugenics?] (in French). Paris: Éditions Odile Jacob. ISBN 2-7381-0682-X. Archived from the original on 31 December 2024.
- Rosental, Paul-André (2016). Destins de l'eugénisme [The destiny of eugenics]. La Librairie du XXIe siècle (in French). Paris: Le Seuil. ISBN 978-2-02-095027-5.
- Schneider, William (1990a). Quality and Quantity, The quest for biological regeneration in twentieth-Century France. Cambridge: Cambridge University Press. ISBN 0-521-37498-7.
- Testart, Jacques (2018). Des hommes probables : De la procréation aléatoire à la reproduction normative [Probable men: From random procreation to normative reproduction] (in French). Média Diffusion. ISBN 978-2-02-141547-6.

=== Articles and chapters ===
- Carol, Anne (1990). "Les enfants de l'amour : à propos de l'eugénisme au XIXe siècle" [Children of love: about eugenics in the 19th century]. Romantisme (in French). 20 (68): 87–95. doi:10.3406/roman.1990.6128. Archived from the original on 15 March 2024.
- Carol, Anne (1996). "Médecine et eugénisme en France, ou le rêve d'une prophylaxie parfaite (XIXe – première moitié du XXe siècle)" [Medicine and eugenics in France, or the dream of perfect prophylaxis (19th – first half of the 20th century)]. Revue d'histoire moderne et contemporaine (in French). 43 (4): 618–631. doi:10.3406/rhmc.1996.1842. ISSN 0048-8003. Archived from the original on 9 July 2024.
- Déchaux, Jean-Hugues (2017). "L'hypothèse du "bébé sur mesure"" [The “made-to-measure baby” hypothesis]. Revue française des affaires sociales (in French) (3). La documentation française: 193–212. doi:10.3917/rfas.173.0193. Archived from the original on 4 January 2022.
- Drouard, Alain (1992). "Aux origines de l'eugénisme en France : le néo-malthusianisme (1896–1914)" [The origins of eugenics in France: neo-Malthusianism (1896–1914)]. Population (in French). 47 (2): 435–459. doi:10.2307/1533917. JSTOR 1533917. Archived from the original on 7 December 2024.
- Fogarty, Richard S; Osborne, Michael A (2010). "Eugenics in France and the Colonies". The Oxford Handbook of the History of Eugenics. Oxford University Press: 332–346. doi:10.1093/oxfordhb/9780195373141.013.0020. ISBN 978-0-19-537314-1. Archived from the original on 10 July 2024.
- Hoffbeck, Valentine (2013). "Le catholicisme à l'épreuve de l'eugénisme en France et en Allemagne (1919–1934)" [Catholicism put to the test by eugenics in France and Germany (1919–1934)]. Revue d'Allemagne et des pays de langue allemande (in French). 45 (45–2): 433–448. doi:10.4000/allemagne.1754. ISSN 0035-0974. Archived from the original on 15 July 2021.
- Katz-Bénichou, Gregory (2007). "L'inepte et l'inapte" [The inept and the unfit]. Corps normalisé, corps stigmatisé, corps racialisé (in French). De Boeck Supérieur. doi:10.3917/dbu.boets.2007.01.0313. ISBN 978-2-8041-5550-6. Archived from the original on 21 April 2023.
- Léonard, Jacques (1986). "Les origines et les conséquences de l'eugénique en France" [The origins and consequences of eugenics in France]. Annales de démographie historique (in French). 1985 (1): 203–214. doi:10.3406/adh.1986.1633. ISSN 0066-2062. Archived from the original on 3 December 2024.
- Moyse, Danielle (2001). "Maintenir le terme d'« eugénisme » pour désigner la présente gestion sélective des naissances ?" [Maintain the term "eugenics" to designate the present selective management of births?]. Bien naître – bien être – bien mourir. Propos sur l'eugénisme et l'euthanasie [Being born well – being well – dying well. Proposals on eugenics and euthanasia]. Réponses philosophiques (in French). Toulouse: ERES. pp. 33–44.
- Mucchielli, Laurent (2006). "Criminology, Hygienism, and Eugenics in France, 1870-1914: The Medical Debates on the Elimination of "Incorrigible" Criminals". Criminals and their Scientists (in French). Cambridge University Press. pp. 207–230. ISBN 978-1-139-05240-5. Archived from the original on 17 June 2018.
- Schneider, William (1982). "Toward the Improvement of the Human Race: The History of Eugenics in France". The Journal of Modern History (in French). 54 (2): 268–291. doi:10.1086/244134. ISSN 0022-2801. PMID 11614784. Archived from the original on 4 January 2022.
- Schneider, William (1986). "L'eugénisme en France : le tournant des années trente" [Eugenics in France: the turn of the thirties]. Sciences Sociales et Santé (in French). 4 (3): 81–114. doi:10.3406/sosan.1986.1041. Archived from the original on 10 July 2024.
- Schneider, William (1990). "The Eugenics Movement in France, 1890-1940". The Wellborn Science: Eugenics in Germany, France, Brazil, and Russia. Oxford University Press. ISBN 0195053613.
- Taguieff, Pierre-André (1991). "L'introduction de l'eugénisme en France : du mot à l'idée" [The introduction of eugenics in France: from word to idea]. Mots. Les Langages du Politique (in French). 26 (1): 23–45. doi:10.3406/mots.1991.1592. Archived from the original on 10 July 2024.
- Taguieff, Pierre-André (1994a). "Eugénisme ou décadence ? L'exception française" [Eugenics or decadence? The French exception]. Ethnologie française (in French). 24 (1): 81–103. JSTOR 40989526.
- Taguieff, Pierre-André (2015). "Eugénisme ou décadence ? L'exception française" [Eugenics or decadence? The French exception]. Ni gauche, ni droite : Les chassés-croisés idéologiques des intellectuels français et allemands dans l'Entre-deux-guerres [Neither left nor right: the ideological crossroads of French and German intellectuals in the interwar period]. Politiques et élites (in French). Maison des Sciences de l’Homme d’Aquitaine. pp. 31–58. doi:10.4000/books.msha.19804. ISBN 978-2-85892-587-2.
- Terrenoire, Gwen (2005). "L'eugénisme en France avant 1939" [Eugenics in France before 1939]. Revue d'histoire de la Shoah (in French). 183 (2): 49–67. doi:10.3917/rhsho.183.0049. ISSN 2111-885X. Archived from the original on 15 July 2021.
- Testart, Jacques (2006). "L'eugénisme médical aujourd'hui et demain" [Medical eugenics today and tomorrow]. L'éternel retour de l'eugénisme [The eternal return of eugenics]. Science, histoire et société (in French). Presses universitaires de France. pp. 31–58.
- Testart, Jacques (2011). "Le diagnostic préimplantatoire (DPI) : outil idéal pour un nouvel eugénisme" [Preimplantation diagnosis (PGD): the ideal tool for a new eugenics]. La vie à son début [Life at the beginning]. Rapports de l'Académie nationale de médecine (in French). Lavoisier. ISBN 978-2257204318.
