= René Martial =

French anthropologist (1873–1955)

Dr. René Martial (17 October 1873 in Paris – 23 January 1955 in Vendôme) was a French anthropologist especially prominent during the 1930s and the Vichy era (1940–1944). He claimed to be a socialist.

== Life ==
Dr. René Martial was also a hygienist who supported eugenics and was a proponent of selective immigration by establishing biochemical criteria for anyone who entered France from abroad. He felt that racial mixing was acceptable as long as immigrants met the necessary requirements. According to Schneider the views on immigration stated by later French politician Jean-Marie Le Pen fitted in well with Martial's earlier ideas.

He also appears in books on the history of the French State when headquartered at the town of Vichy, and said that anti-Semitism was an example of French-style racism. The social trajectory of this character disappears behind the excessive visibility of his collaboration and his works.

== Selected works ==
- Traits de l'immigration et de la greffe inter-raciale, Larose, 1931, rewarded by the Institut de France
- La Race française, Mercure de France, 1934, réédité en 1943, rewarded by the Institut de France
- Race, hérédité, folie. Etude d’anthropo-sociologie appliquée à l’immigration, Paris, Mercure de France, 1938
- Vie et constance des races, Mercure de France, 1939.
- Français qui es-tu ? Mercure de France, 1942
- Les Métis - Nouvelle étude sur les migrations, le mélange des races, le métissage, la retrempe de la race française et la révision du code de la famille, Flammarion, 1942
- Notre race et ses aïeux, Perqual, 1943
- Les races humaines, Hachette, 1955
