= Charles-Augustin Vandermonde =

French physician

Charles-Augustin Vandermonde (18 June 1727 – 28 May 1762) was a French physician, writer and editor.

== Life ==
His father, Jacques-François Vandermonde, originally from Landrecies in French Flanders, was a doctor of medicine, receiving his degree from the Faculty of Medicine of Reims. In 1720, he left for the Far East in the service of the French East India Company. He first served at Poulo Condor, then in Canton and finally in the at the time Portuguese colony of Macao where he worked as a doctor from 1723. Charles-Augustin Vandermonde was born in Macao in 1727. After the death of his mother, Doria Espérance Cacilla, Charles-Augustin and his father returned to France and Paris in 1732, where the father died in 1746.

Charles-Augustin Vandermonde became a doctor of medicine at the Paris Faculty of Medicine in 1750. He died in 1762 at the age of 34.

== Work ==
In 1756 he published the Essai sur la manière de perfectionner l'espèce humaine in which he argued that humans can be improved by applying principles of animal breeding to them. He also edited one of the first medical periodicals, the Recueil périodique d’observations de médecine, chirurgie, pharmacie (later the Journal de médecine, chirurgie, pharmacie). In 1759 he anonymously published a popular medical dictionary, the Dictionnaire portatif de santé.
