= Fae Brauer =

Professor at University of East London

Fay (Fae) Brauer is Professor Emeritus of Art and Visual Culture at the Centre for Cultural Studies Research, University of East London and Associate Professor of Art History, and Honorary Associate Professor in Art History and Cultural Theory at the University of New South Wales. Her books include Picturing Evolution and Extinction: Regeneration and Degeneration in Modern Visual Culture; Rivals and Conspirators: The Paris Salons and the Modern Art Centre; The Art of Evolution: Darwin, Darwinism and Visual Culture, and Art, Sex and Eugenics: Corpus Delecti. She is the author of many book chapters and journal articles investigating the interrelationship of art, visual culture, medicine and science, particularly in relation to the Anthropocene, the body, eugenics, genetics and alternative sciences such as "animal magnetism" and occultism. She has Honours Degrees from the University of London with an MA and PhD from The Courtauld Institute of Art, London.

Brauer's research encompasses Modernism and Postmodernism, particularly intersections with art, science and medicine. Her books include Vitalist Modernism: Art, Science, Energy and Creative Evolution (2023); Picturing Evolution and Extinction: Regeneration and Degeneration in Modern Visual Culture (2015); Rivals and Conspirators: The Paris Salons and the Modern Art Centre (2013), The Art of Evolution: Darwin, Darwinisms and Visual Culture (2009), plus the award-winning Art, Sex and Eugenics: Corpus Delecti (2008).

Author of some 40 book chapters, most recently these include two chapters on two remarkable Jewish art dealers during the twentieth century, Alfred Flechtheim and Daniel-Henry Kahnweiler, drawing upon research stretching back to her time as a PhD student when granted a unique opportunity to access their archives. These book chapters are:

“Flamboyantly Gay, Jewish and Avant-Garde: Alfred Flechtheim’s Dealing with Transitional Aesthetics, Transsexualities and Antisemitism” Chapter 11, Modernist Aesthetics in Transition: Visual Culture in the Weimar Republic and Nazi Germany (Bloomsbury Academic, 2024)

“Exterminating Cubisms: Bochisme, L’Art Juif and the Vilification of Daniel-Henry Kahnweiler”, Jewish Art Dealers and the European Art Market, 1850-1940 (Bloomsbury Academic, 2024), the book arising from the conference on Jewish Dealers and the European Art Market at the Victoria and Albert Museum in 2021.

Articles • Virilizing and Valorizing Homoeroticism: Eugen Sandow’s Queering of Body Culture before and after the Wilde Trials • L’Art Eugénique: Biopower and the Biocultures of Regeneration • Contesting “Le Corps Militaire”: Antimilitarism, Pacifism, Anarcho-Communism and 'Le Douanier' Rousseau's La Guerre • Rupturing Versailles: Joana Vasconcelos’s Disembodiment, Feminization and Kitsch • Moral Girls’ and ‘Filles Fatales’: The Fetishization of Innocence • The Sado-Masochism of Invention: Marcel Duchamp’s Ironic Inversions of Jules Amar’s Human Motor • Flaunting Manliness: Republican Masculinity, Virilized Homosexuality and the Desirable Male Body • “Bulging Buttocks”: Picturing Virile Homosexuality and the ‘Manly Man’ • Eradicating Difference: The Bioethics of Imaging ‘Degeneracy’ and Exhibiting Eugenics • Representing ‘Le Moteur Humain’: Chronometry, Chronophotography, ‘The Art of Work’ and the ‘Taylored Body • The Darwin/ist of Art History • The Darwin of Art History: E. H. Gombrich • Writing French Art Histories of Dissension in the Shadow of Vichy • Hegelian History, Wölfflinean Periodization and ‘Smithesque Modernism’ • Crossing Disciplines and Cubism • An Horizon is both pictorial and strategic: The Geopolitics of Land and Landscape • And love a fantasy breastfeeding our sexuality • The Art(s) of Political Correctness • In my art I try to give fear a face”: Paula Rego • The Sleep of Reason begets Monsters: Bonita Ely • Nature/Nurture/Culture: Janet Laurence • The Bricoleur - The Borderico - The Postcolonial Boundary Rider • BERLIN-BERLIN: The Art of Post-Unification Exchange

Contemporary Art Catalogues •The Art of Installation, Ivan Dougherty Gallery Catalogue, Sydney, March 1989; • “Inversion/Subversion”, The Viaduct Project, New South Wales Government Ministry for the Arts, 1995-1996; • “The Sublime and the Strange, Malcolm Poole’s Aerial Art”, Malcolm Poole: Paintings, Australia House Exhibition, London, May 2001. • “Forging a new ‘School of Paris’: Chez la Cité des Arts”, ‘Paris Days’ Exhibition, Ivan Dougherty Gallery, The University of New South Wales, March-April 2002; • “The Sexed Body: The Great Danger”, With and Without You: Revisitations of Art in the Age of AIDS, Ivan Dougherty Gallery, Sydney, October-November 2002; • Burnt Offerings, Galerie Baudoin Lebon, Paris, June 2006; • Four Seasons: Vivian Van Blerk, La galerie Beckel Odille Boïcos, Paris, June 2006; • The Cultures of Dissection: Kate Scardifield's Women Wielding the Knife, Exhibition, The Whole and the Sum of its Parts, Kate Scardifield, MOP Projects, 2010 (ISBN 978-1-921661-136); • Circulation and Respiration: Lisa Jones' Body Circuits and Breathing Cities, Exhibition, Lisa Jones, Invisible Cities, Conny Dietzschold Gallery, Sydney and Cologne, 2013 (ISBN 978-0--9803315-7-8); • Anthropocene, UEL AVA Exhibition, AVA Gallery, University of East London, Docklands Campus, April 2016; co-curator of exhibition; • “Naturyzacja Ewolucji: Kolonie Zwierzece, Drzewa Zycia I Modernizm, Miedzygatunkowy”, Superorganizm: Awangarda I Doswiadczenie Prysrody; • ‘Superevolution: Interspecies Modernism and the Naturization of Modernity’, Chapter Seven, Superorganism: The Avant-Garde and the Experience of Nature; Muzeum Sztuki, Lodz, Poland, 2017, pp. 149-184 (14 illustrations); ISBN 978-83-63820-53-4; • Earth, UEL Exhibition, AVA Gallery, University of East London, Docklands Campus, April 2018;

Contemporary Art, Theory and Polemics Contemporary Polemics Writer, Art Monthly UK, 1985-1992; Art Monthly, Australia and International, 1986-1992; Artscribe.

Contemporary Art Guest Lectures Feminisms and "Femmage": Miriam Schapiro, Lecture in Honour of Simone de Beauvoir, Art Gallery of New South Wales, April 1986. The Commodification of Art: Blue Poles, Power Institute of Fine Art, University of Sydney, April 1986. The Spectacle of the Venice Biennale, RMIT and University of Melbourne, October 1988. Gender, Otherness and the Museum: The Politics of Representation, Queen Mary College, University of London, July 1996. “Spectacular Bodies: Dissecting Art, Science and Medicine”, The Best of COFA Lecture Series, 20 April 2010, The University of New South Wales College of Fine Arts (see website, UNSWTV: Faculty of Fine Arts). “Artists as Geneticists: Evolutionism, Transspeciation and Transgenic Art”, Art Talk: Critical Dialogue, Convenor Simeon Lockhart Nelson, University of Hertfordshire School of Creative Arts, Hatfield, 26 November 2014. “Becoming Simian: Modernism’s Challenge to the Anthropocene”, Culture, Memory and Extinction, The Natural History Museum, Flett Theatre, 11 December 2015. “Primate Visions: Modernist Monkey Business and Interspecies Relationality”, New Research in Art History and Visual Culture, University of Bristol Postgraduate Guest Lecture Programme, Convenor, Professor Dorothy Price, 26 April 2016.

== Personal life ==
Brauer is married to the playwright, Justin Fleming, has two children. She resides in London, Paris, and Sydney.
