= Lucien March =

French demographer and statistician

Lucien March (6 December 1859 – 4 April 1933) was a French demographer, statistician, and engineer.

In 1878 Lucien March enrolled in l'École polytechnique and after graduation in 1880 served in the naval artillery corps. He was the director of the Statistique générale de la France (SGF) from 1896 to 1920. In 1896, he introduced Hollerith punched card tabulating machines into France and later invented an improved machine, the classifier-counter-printer, which was used until the 1940s. He also arranged a sorting process using the workplace addresses of the people counted in the French population census to generate valuable economic data and labor statistics.

He was an invited speaker of the International Congress of Mathematicians (ICM) in Rome (1908), Toronto (1924), and Bologna (1928).

In 1912, upon his return from an international congress on eugenics, held in London, March helped to found a French eugenics society, which published in 1922 Eugénique et Sélection, a collection of essays on eugenics. In the 1920s he played an important role in the International Federation of Eugenics Organizations.

== Selected publications ==
- "Les représentations graphiques et la statistique comparative". Journal de la société française de statistique (in French). 45: 407–420. 1904. ISSN 1962-5197.
- "Comparaison numérique de courbes statistiques". Journal de la société française de statistique (in French). 46: 255–277. 1905. ISSN 1962-5197.
- "Remarques sur la terminologie en statistique". Journal de la société française de statistique (in French). 49: 290–296. 1908. ISSN 1962-5197.
- March, Lucien (April 1912). "Some Researches Concerning the Factors of Mortality". Journal of the Royal Statistical Society. 75 (5): 505–538. doi:10.2307/2340112. JSTOR 2340112.
- Mouvement des prix et des salaires pendant la guerre (in French). Paris: Carnegie Endowment for International Peace, Presses Universitaires de France. 1925.
- "Différences et corrélation en statistique". Journal de la société française de statistique (in French). 69: 38–63. 1928. ISSN 1962-5197.
- La statistique et sa méthode (in French). Paris: Masson et Cie. 1928. OCLC 758285835.
- Différences et corrélation en statistique (in French). Nancy-Paris: Berger-Levrault. 1928. OCLC 492286219.
- Les principes de la méthode statistique: avec quelques applications aux sciences naturelles et à la science des affaires (in French). Librairie Félix Alcan. 1930. OCLC 803266166.
