= Immigration statistics in France =

Statistics about the immigration to France are based on variables whose compilation is governed by law. They are mainly produced from the census. Statistics on residence permits, asylum applications and thematic surveys of population samples are also used. The data produced varies from one organization to another, due to differences in definitions.

The type and quality of statistics compiled from the census have evolved over time, in line with changes in the status of foreigners, the possibilities of acquiring citizenship and the nomenclature of population categories. Within the scientific community, in connection with the fight against discrimination, there is a debate on the recording of variables revealing the origins of individuals.

Statistics on immigration in France have a political dimension. Political discourse and public action rely on the interpretation or manipulation of figures to shape immigration policy.

== Categories of people in the French statistics system ==
In 1991, the French High Council for Integration defined the category of "immigrant" as distinct from "foreigner". An immigrant is a person born outside France who was of foreign nationality at birth. French descendants born abroad are neither immigrants nor foreigners. Foreigners born in France, generally children who will acquire French nationality, are not immigrants either, as they have not crossed a border. (Note: Spire & Merllié 1999, p. 125.) (Note: Borrel 2004, par. 30-31.) (Note: Cornuau & Dunezat 2008, par. 11-13.) French immigrants are therefore included in both French citizen and immigration statistics. (Note: Héran 2017, chap. 8, par. 11.)

Immigrants, on the other hand, are born abroad, whatever their nationality or nationalities at birth. This is a broader definition for people changing their place of residence. For its statistics, the United Nations defines an immigrant as a person whose daily resting place reaches, or is expected to reach, at least one year in the territory of a state other than that of his or her last habitual residence. The duration of residence may therefore be shorter than the duration of the residence permit. (Note: Borrel 2004, par. 5-7.)

== Data sources ==
France does not have a population register. (Note: Borrel 2004, par. 9.) Data on illegal immigrants, i.e. those without a residence permit, are estimated on the basis of the number of people receiving state medical aid. (Note: Héran 2017, chap. 8, par. 19.) Data on legal immigrants comes from several sources.

=== Censuses ===
The French National Institute for Statistics and Economic Studies (INSEE) is responsible for France's population census, a major source of data.

Since 2004, INSEE no longer carries out a general population census every eight or nine years, but instead conducts annual sample censuses, (Note: Héran 2017, chap. 10, par. 6 et 7.) registering immigrants who have lived in France for more than a year. This is the only source covering also nationals of European Union countries. (Note: Borrel 2004, par. 37.) The loss of completeness is largely compensated for by the tighter annual frequency. In addition, questions on country of birth and current and previous nationalities make it possible to track changes in net migration between people born abroad (immigrants), those born in France and French-descendants born abroad. (Note: Temporal & Brutel 2016, par. 15-16.)

The data can be undermined by situations of dual residence, where people do not have a single regular place of residence, and by people commuting between countries. For example, in the first case, in 2004, the Ministry of the Interior counted 105,000 Algerians aged 64 or over with a valid residence permit, while INSEE counted 63,000. The first were not present at the time of the census. In the second case, the back-and-forth between countries can lead to a person being counted again after several years. (Note: Borrel 2004, par. 38-39.)

=== Residence permits ===
The Ministry of the Interior also publishes statistics resulting from the issuance of residence permits by prefectures. Minors under the age of 16 are not included, nor are non-working minors aged 16 to 18. Since 2004, nationals of the European Economic Area and Switzerland are no longer included. Previously, they were only partially included, as not all of them applied for a residence permit. (Note: Borrel 2004, par. 12-16.)

From 2000 to 2009, the National Institute for Demographic Studies, a French organization, records the number of foreigners obtaining a residence permit of at least one year for the first time. This includes some students. As these people may leave before their residence permit expires, this figure is recalculated on the basis of an effective presence of one year. Following a reform of residence permits in 2009, INED is now able to access all administrative data on residence permits. (Note: Temporal & Brutel 2016, par. 6.) The figure obtained is supplemented by an assessment of EU nationals. Because of its broader definition than that of INED, the UN figures are higher. In 2019, France had a 10% immigrant population according to the French definition, but a 13% immigrant population according to the UN definition. The latter figure is reached thanks to the census, which records the return of natives from abroad.

The Organisation for Economic Co-operation and Development, a European body, uses residence permits to count so-called "permanent" immigrants, who receive a residence permit that is, in principle, renewable indefinitely.

Numbers counted on the basis of residence permits are of a legal nature. Entry into French territory may take place before or after the date of application for a residence permit. The expiry of a residence permit does not necessarily indicate departure from the country. According to sociological studies, census data is more reliable than information provided by residence permits.

=== Right to asylum ===
The statistics France submits to Eurostat, a European body, are based on figures from the French Office for Immigration and Integration (OFII) and the French Office for the Protection of Refugees and Stateless Persons (OFPRA). OFII publishes statistics on adult and minor immigrants who are not nationals of a European Economic Area country, all of whom are subject to a compulsory medical examination. (Note: Borrel 2004, par. 11.) Until 2002, OFPRA recorded the files of adults who applied for asylum and their outcome. Thereafter, it also counts accompanying adults and minors. These people may live on French territory for a long time before receiving a decision. (Note: Borrel 2004, par. 17-20.) Eurostat figures may be several tens of thousands lower than those of INED, as they are limited to entries by non-EU nationals - holders of a residence permit or beneficiaries of the right of asylum - regardless of the duration of the permit. Entries by temporary or seasonal workers, asylum seekers - i.e. those who have not yet received a decision - and students are not included.

=== Surveys ===
A further source of information is provided by thematic surveys of population samples. They cover a wide range of subjects. Their aim is to study behavior. (Note: Spire & Merllié 1999, p. 120 et 130.) The permanent demographic sample was introduced in 1968. Since 2003, all surveys conducted by the National Institute for Statistics and Economic Studies (INSEE) have included questions on parents' origins, making it possible to count and describe the children of immigrants, even if they were born in France and became French. (Note: Héran 2017, chap. 8, par. 12.)

== Data protection legislation ==
The collection and use of data is governed by the French Data Protection Act of 1978, amended in 2004, which prohibits "except with the express consent of the person concerned, the collection or processing of personal data which reveals, directly or indirectly, the racial or ethnic origins, political, philosophical or religious opinions or trade-union membership of individuals, or which relates to the health or sexual orientation of such individuals". As such, "race" and "ethnicity" variables are usually absent from people management files. A few exceptions are provided for, for instance in cases of the public interest, statistical processing carried out by INSEE or a ministerial statistical service, or the processing of data required to establish, exercise or defend a legal claim. (Note: Simon & Stavo-Debauge 2004, par. 35-37.) Private operators are subject to the law, but may also apply for exemptions. In all cases, there must be no direct or indirect means of identifying the persons concerned by the data collection.

The National Data Protection Authority (CNIL) is responsible for enforcing these regulations, which were drawn up for fear of misuse of the information collected. As the notions of race or ethnicity have not been precisely defined, the CNIL interprets the scope of the variables and the circumstances of collection and processing to judge the potential use that could, in the worst-case scenario, be made of them. (Note: Simon & Stavo-Debauge 2004, par. 35-41.) Research surveys, for example on religion or ethnic origins, may therefore benefit from exemptions. (Note: Héran 2017, chap. 8, par. 14 et 26..) The census provides information on the nationality of foreigners and immigrants, as well as on the origins of parents, which can be considered ethnic data.

Unlike private institutes, public administrations producing statistics are also subject to the law of June 7, 1951, amended in May 2009. The law establishes the National Council for Statistical Information (Conseil national de l'information statistique - CNIS), a consultative body with the power to make proposals and oversee public statistical surveys. (Note: Héran 2010, pp. 98–100.)

== Background and debates on legislative parameters and variables ==
Statistical data classification is not neutral, since it constructs a reading grid through which reality is recorded and interpreted. It produces the meaning on which public action is based, which, in turn, can lead to a modification of the system and thus to a redrawing of the population. (Note: Simon 2003b, par. 19-20.)

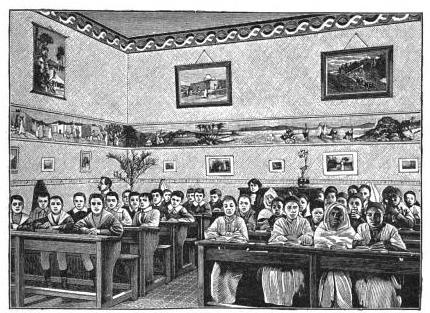
Histoire de France, cours élémentaire, Ernest Lavisse, Armand Colin, 1913, p. 181. The school is one of the instruments of assimilation.

=== Changes in the status of foreigners ===
Initially, the categories used in the census were based on legal definitions of population categories. (Note: Spire & Merllié 1999, pp. 122–124.) The Civil Code of 1804 recognized as French only children born of French parents. The mid-nineteenth century saw the crystallization of the French national myth, which Jules Michelet and later Ernest Lavisse helped to establish and disseminate. (Note: Simon 2003b, par. 9.) The foreigner is a body outside the State and society. In 1851, more than sixty years after the first censuses were taken, the number of naturalized French citizens began to be counted. That same year, a law automatically conferred French nationality on any child born on French soil to a foreign father. This provision was extended to mothers in 1893. (Note: Simon 1998, pp. 544–545.) (Note: Spire & Merllié 1999, pp. 122–124.)

In 1889, due to the significant demographic growth of foreigners on French territory, a law was passed stipulating that "any individual born in France to a foreigner and who, at the time of his majority, is domiciled in France, is French, unless, in the year following his majority, he has declined to be French". This law, the result of an assimilationist vision of the nation, ensured the rapid disappearance of the foreign population. The existence of the Naturalized French category stems from public policy issues. Its purpose is to study the assimilation of foreigners into the French population. (Note: Simon 2003b, par. 13.)

From 1881 to 1990, public registers differentiated between French nationals by birth, naturalized French nationals and foreigners, who were required to specify their nationality. (Note: Simon & Stavo-Debauge 2004, par. 25.) Until 1927, French women who married foreigners became legal foreigners. From 1962 onwards, survey require naturilized French to state their original nationality. (Note: Simon 1998, p. 548.) Between 1954 and 1968, French Muslims appear in the data tables. (Note: Simon 2003b, par. 16.) In 1891, from 1926 to 1936 and from 1975 onwards, foreigners are the subject of a special volume, in line with the importance of the immigration theme in political debate. In the second half of the 20th century, nationality became a significant descriptor in all statistics based on census results. (Note: Simon 1998, p. 547.)

During the 20th century, the main stream of French sociological thought promoted the "thesis of the social contract as the foundation of the modern nation", and a division of society into antagonistic classes which assimilation should reduce. (Note: Simon 2003b, par. 9-10.) The emergence of cultural pluralism was hard to imagine. (Note: Simon 2003b, par. 18.) The category of immigrant, poorly defined at the time, was seen as irrelevant, as immigration was not seen as a long-term phenomenon.

=== Fighting discrimination and introducing the "immigrant" category ===
In the 1980s, the French political authorities began to realize that the immigrant population, which had been considered a temporary workforce, was destined to settle on a long-term basis. To integrate these populations, it was necessary to know who they were, and therefore to develop statistical resources. In 1991, the statistical category of "immigrants", a pure creation of statisticians, was added to complement the legal category of "foreigners", which included a population that was administratively constructed and sociologically irrelevant. This new category improves the congruence of data with social issues such as the study of discrimination. Since 1999, respondents have been asked their country of birth, nationality and any previous nationality.

At the same time, from 1992 to 1995, the National Institute of Demographic Studies, in collaboration with the National Institute of Statistics and Economic Studies, and under the direction of Michèle Tribalat, carried out the Geographic Mobility and Social Integration survey on immigrant populations and their children. Ethnic categories were used, as well as a category called "native French ". (Note: Simon & Stavo-Debauge 2004, par. 28-30.) Initial criticisms of the survey's method, epistemology and tools soon emerged. The controversy became particularly violent and reached its peak during the 1999 census, to such an extent that the national press got involved. Researchers are torn between the ability of statistics to inform and their capacity to enclose the world in a representation. "The production of "ethnic" or "racial" statistics requires a set of conditions that clash head-on with the tradition of French statistics and sociology". (Note: Simon & Stavo-Debauge 2004, par. 4.) Scientific, political and also historical issues - statisticians collaborated in the enforcement of the anti-Jewish laws of 1940 - are involved.

Some scientists are calling for new ways of measuring origins, in order to assess the extent of discrimination and thus guide public action, but also to respond to criticism from the extreme right. (Note: Simon & Stavo-Debauge 2004, par. 4, 6 et 26.) However, the ways of categorizing populations practiced in Anglo-Saxon countries, and on which they wish to model themselves, also have their limits. The reliability of responses, on the one hand, and the phenomenon of métissage, opinions and identity, on the other, are obstacles to categorization based on objective data (nationality, place of birth, parents' place of birth, language spoken or mother tongue, religion, skin color, etc.) and to categorization based on a notion of origins (Asian, African-American, White, etc.). (Note: Spire & Merllié 1999, pp. 126–128.) What these two types of methods have in common is that they "only partially capture what really underpins discrimination: other people's perception of an individual's origin". (Note: Spire & Merllié 1999, p. 128.)

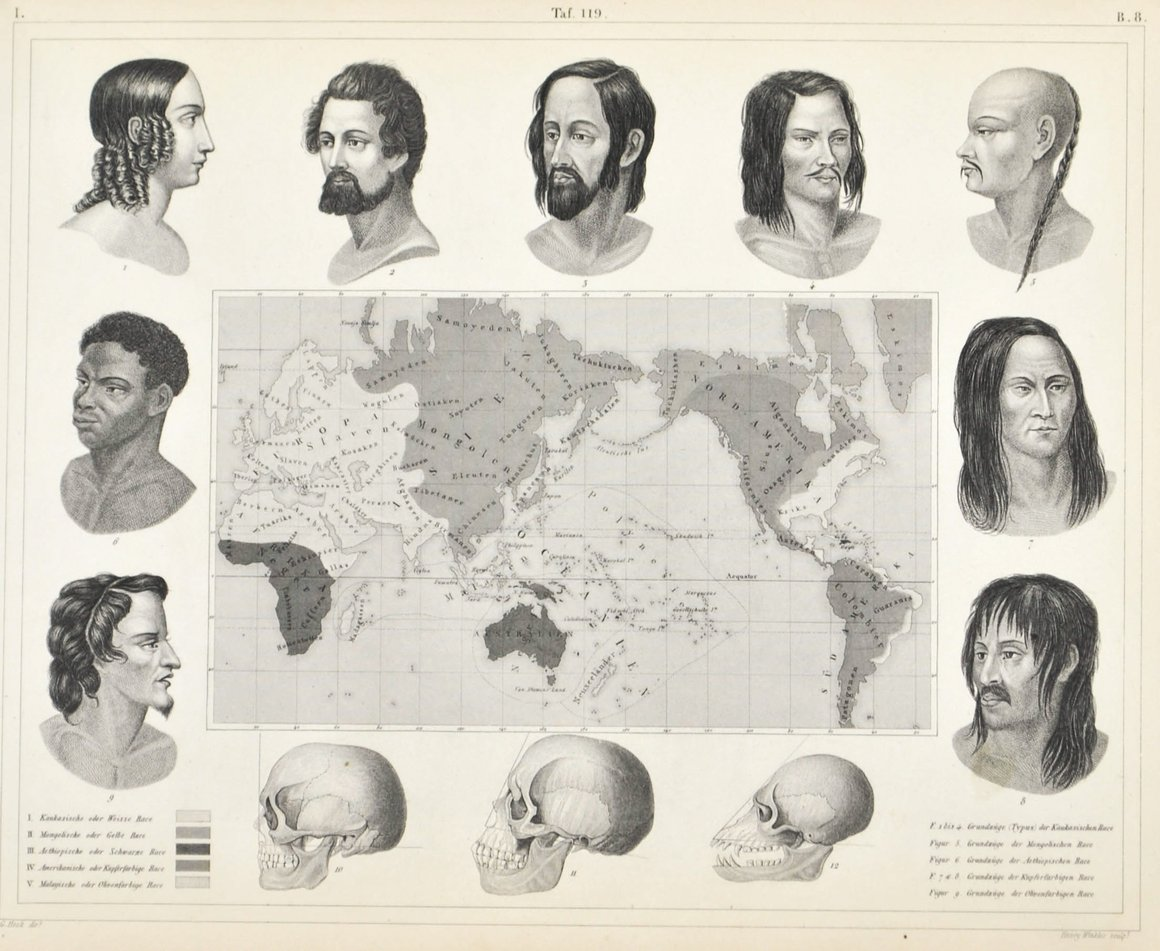
Classification of "human races" according to phenotypic traits in the Iconographic Encyclopedia of Science, Literature and Art published in 1851.

Opponents of recording variables on origins argue that there is a "risk of stigmatizing a population who no-one should distinguish from other French people", or that it is necessary to preserve the mystery of origins so that the nation remains united by avoiding identity assignment. There are also fears of excessive invasion of privacy, a resurgence of racial classifications and eugenic thinking, and use for questionable or malicious political ends. Most opponents want to stick to the status quo, i.e. the inclusion of data on "immigrants" or "children of immigrants". A few wish to avoid statistical categorization, and stick to monographic observational studies on limited samples, or to qualitative studies.

To avoid discrimination, some organizations use the categories "French", "foreigners from the European Union" and "foreigners from outside the European Union" in their publications, in place of nationality. This does not allow for full cross-referencing of information and, according to P. Simon and J. Stavo-Debauge, produces the opposite effect by creating a quasi-hierarchy, with foreigners from outside the European Union making up the group with the most difficulties. (Note: Simon & Stavo-Debauge 2004, par. 43-44.) Paradoxically, a highly aggregated country classification is more evocative of ethnic discrimination than a country-level classification. Other organizations redact variables such as nationality, necessary for the proper processing of their files, when publishing data. (Note: Simon & Stavo-Debauge 2004, par. 42.)

=== Shifting the debate to skin color ===
In practice, the law and judicial practice allow ethnic statistics to be drawn up, where the nationality of foreigners and immigrants and the origins of their parents are recorded. In a decision dated November 15, 2007, the French Constitutional Council ruled that this was an "objective" method for "measuring diversity". At the beginning of the 21st century, the debate shifted to skin color. The racial categories used in certain research studies should not be taken as essential truths, but as perceived categories, to be studied as such, with the aim of revealing the mechanisms of discrimination by studying behavior. (Note: Héran 2010, pp. 168–169.)

== Data interpretation by the public sphere ==
For researchers, the purpose of statistical data on immigration, whatever their nature, is to understand "dynamics, background trends, correlations or causal relationships". In other words, their purpose is not simply to count people, but to study the place of immigrants in society. (Note: Héran 2017, chap. 9, par. 20..)

This data is subject to pressure from the rest of society because of its political nature. Categories and ways of classifying populations are the object of this pressure. Political discourse, which varies from party to party, and public action are based on the interpretation of figures to define immigration policy, whether it be to promote, limit or abolish it. (Note: Cornuau & Dunezat 2008, par. 31.) Immigration statistics are also a means for civil society to evaluate the actions of those in power. (Note: Héran 2017, chap. 9, par. 10 à 17..) Statistics on emigration and the return of immigrants do not feature prominently in public debate. (Note: Temporal & Brutel 2016, par. 7-9.)

For ideological or journalistic purposes, the different categories of immigrant and foreigner may be lumped together, and the results of demographic and sociological studies based on statistical data may be over-interpreted or misused. A lot of raw data cannot be disconnected from the determination of risk factors, for example, when it comes to determining a tendency towards violence. (Note: Héran 2017, chap. 9, par. 21..) The transition from observation to normative judgement based on count data alone can also be problematic, due to the difficulty of setting thresholds. For example, French people's feelings about the proportion of immigrants do not shed any light on the number of immigrants that society can tolerate. (Note: Héran 2017, chap. 9, par. 22..)

== Bibliography ==
- Borrel, Catherine (2004). "Les limites de l'approche statistique des circulations migratoires : Le système statistique français". Revue française des affaires sociales (in French) (2): 73–85. doi:10.3917/rfas.042.0073.
- Cornuau, Frédérique; Dunezat, Xavier (2008). "L'immigration en France: concepts, contours et politiques". Espaces, populations, sociétés (2008/2): 331–352. doi:10.4000/eps.3330.
- Héran, François (2017). Avec l'immigration: Mesurer, débattre, agir. Paris: La Découverte. doi:10.3917/dec.heran.2017.01. ISBN 9782707195821.
- Héran, François (2010). Inégalités et discriminations. Pour un usage critique et responsable de l'outil statistique. Rapport du comité pour la mesure de la diversité et l'évaluation des discriminations (COMEDD ) (PDF) (in French). Paris: COMEDD.
- Simon, Patrick (1998). "Nationalité et origine dans la statistique française: les catégories ambiguës". Population. 53 (3): 541–567. doi:10.2307/1534261. JSTOR 1534261.
- Simon, Patrick (2003a). "L'impasse de l'analyse statistique dans une France sans "races"". Hommes & Migrations. 1245 (1245): 42–53. doi:10.3406/homig.2003.4062.
- Simon, Patrick (2003b). "Les sciences sociales françaises face aux catégories ethniques et raciales". Annales de démographie historique. 105 (1): 111–130. doi:10.3917/adh.105.0111.
- Simon, Patrick; Stavo-Debauge, Joan (2004). "Les politiques anti-discrimination et les statistiques: parametres d'une incoherence". Sociétés contemporaines. 53 (2004/1): 57–84. doi:10.3917/soco.053.0057.
- Spire, Alexis; Merllié, Dominique (1999). "La question des origines dans les statistiques en France. Les enjeux d'une controverse". Le Mouvement Social (188): 119–130. doi:10.2307/3779961. JSTOR 3779961.
- Temporal, Franck; Brutel, Chantal (2016). "La mesure des flux migratoires entre la France et l'étranger: et si on parlait (aussi) d'émigration?". Revue Européenne des Migrations Internationales. 32 (3): 215–229. doi:10.4000/remi.8270.
