= Institut national d'études démographiques =

French populations studies research institute

The French Institute for Demographic Studies (French: Institut national d'études démographiques, pronounced [ɛ̃stity nɑsjɔnal detyd demɔɡʁafik]; INED) is a French research institute specializing in demography and population studies in general.

== History ==
=== Before 1945 ===
In 1941, Nobel Prize winner Alexis Carrel, an early proponent of eugenics and euthanasia, and a member of Jacques Doriot's French Popular Party (PPF), advocated for the creation of the French Foundation for the Study of Human Problems (Fondation Française pour l'Étude des Problèmes Humains), using connections to the Pétain cabinet. Charged with the "study, in all of its aspects, of measures aimed at safeguarding, improving and developing the French population in all of its activities", the Foundation was created by decree of the collaborationist Vichy regime in 1941, and Carrel appointed as 'regent'. The Foundation also had for some time as general secretary François Perroux.

The Foundation was behind the 16 December 1942 Act mandating the "prenuptial certificate", which required all couples seeking marriage to submit to a biological examination, to insure the "good health" of the spouses, in particular with regard to sexually transmitted diseases (STD) and "life hygiene". Carrel's institute also conceived the "scholar booklet" ("livret scolaire"), which could be used to record students' grades in French secondary schools, and thus classify and select them according to scholastic performance. Besides these eugenic activities aimed at classifying the population and improving its health, the Foundation also supported the 11 October 1946 law instituting occupational medicine, enacted by the Provisional Government of the French Republic (GPRF) after the Liberation.

The Foundation initiated studies on demographics (Robert Gessain, Paul Vincent, Jean Bourgeois), nutrition (Jean Sutter), and housing (Jean Merlet), as well as the first polls (Jean Stoetzel). The foundation, which after the war became the INED demographics institute, employed 300 researchers from the summer of 1942 to the end of the autumn of 1944. "The foundation was chartered as a public institution under the joint supervision of the ministries of finance and public health. It was given financial autonomy and a budget of forty million francs, roughly one franc per inhabitant: a true luxury considering the burdens imposed by the German Occupation on the nation's resources. By way of comparison, the whole Centre National de la Recherche Scientifique (CNRS) was given a budget of fifty million francs."

Alexis Carrel had previously published in 1935 the best-selling book L'Homme, cet inconnu ("Man, This Unknown"). Since the early 1930s, Carrel had advocated the use of gas chambers to rid humanity of its "inferior stock", and endorsed scientific racism discourse. One of the founders of these pseudoscientific theories had been Arthur de Gobineau in his 1853–1855 essay titled An Essay on the Inequality of the Human Races. In the 1936 preface to the German edition of his book, Carrel had added praise for the eugenics policies of the Third Reich, writing that:

(t)he German government has taken energetic measures against the propagation of the defective, the mentally diseased, and the criminal. The ideal solution would be the suppression of each of these individuals as soon as he has proven himself to be dangerous.

=== 1945–1986 ===
INED was founded by virtue of the ministerial order no. 45-2499 of 24 October 1945. It was created on the initiative of the eminent paediatrician Robert Debré (1882-1978), who had submitted a report on the institutionalization of demography to the Comité français de la Libération nationale d'Alger in January 1944. To head the institute, General Charles de Gaulle appointed the statistician and economist Alfred Sauvy who, as advisor to the President of the Council, Paul Reynaud, had drafted the French government's first pro-natalist measures in 1938. INED moved into the premises of the Fondation française pour l'étude des problèmes humains headed by Dr Alexis Carrel, and employed around 7% of the foundation's personnel, which counted only a handful of demographers.

The 1945 order defined the missions of INED: "The role of INED is to study demographic problems in all their aspects. To this end, the Institute will collect the relevant documentation, conduct surveys, carry out experiments and follow experiments conducted abroad, study the material and moral means which may contribute to the quantitative growth of the population and its qualitative development, and ensure the dissemination of demographic knowledge".

=== Founding generation ===
The early days were difficult for INED. With the unexpected onset of the baby boom (200,000 additional births in France in 1946), an institute to promote fertility became apparently superfluous. But before long, INED was asked to study the consequences of the baby boom and its effect on housing, school enrolment, employment, infant and maternal mortality. The first INED demographers, mostly graduates of Ecole Polytechnique, drew inspiration from Alfred J. Lotka (1880-1949) and Pierre Depoid (1909-1968) to develop original demographic analysis methods which affirmed the scientific independence of INED and established its international reputation. Eminent INED researchers include:

- Jean Bourgeois-Pichat (1912-1990), who explored the notions of stable, quasi-stable and semi-stable populations, and modelled the networks of relationships between demographic variables (he worked at the United Nations Population Division from 1953 to 1962 before succeeding Alfred Sauvy as Director of INED);
- Louis Henry (1911-1991), founder of historical demography, who, from 1953, began using data from the parish registers of the Ancien Régime to reconstitute families and retrace the population dynamics of France from 1740 to 1830 (survey conducted in association with the archivist Michel Fleury);
- Sully Ledermann (1915-1967), who applied multivariate analysis methods to establish model life tables on the basis of one or two parameters;
- Paul Vincent (1912-1979), who introduced the notion of momentum to measure the growth potential of a population contained in its age structure.

The work of these pioneers was set down in the manuals and the dictionary of demography written by Roland Pressat (who joined INED in 1953), which became essential reading for generations of students. Pressat disseminated the principles of demographic analysis internationally, notably in Quebec, Eastern Europe and Africa. It is he who devised the modern form of the "Lexis diagram", a key tool for demonstrating the relationship between periods and cohorts. The sociologist Jean Stoetzel (1910-1987), who founded IFOP in 1938 after working as an internee for Gallup in America, was a pioneer of survey studies at INED. With the help of Alain Girard (1914-1996), he launched surveys on women's employment, ideal family size, choice of spouse, immigration, etc. He was succeeded in this area by Louis Roussel in the 1970s, and by Henri Léridon in the 1980s.

The social history of population is represented by Louis Chevalier (1911-2001), a historian of Paris, who was elected to the Collège de France in 1952; the history of disease by Dr Jean-Noël Biraben.

Population genetics were developed successively by Jean Sutter (1910-1970) and Albert Jacquard (1925- ).

A second generation of INED researchers joined the institute in 1965, some from the Ecole Polytéchnique (Daniel Courgeau, Henri Leridon, Hervé Le Bras) and others from wide-ranging backgrounds (Jacques Vallin, Georges Tapinos [1940-2000], Patrick Festy, Chantal Blayo, Jean-Claude Chesnais).

=== Redefinition of role ===
Through a 1986 decree which superseded the 1945 order, INED became a public scientific and technological establishment (établissement public à caractère scientifique et technologique, EPST), with a legal status similar to that of other French public research bodies such as CNRS, INRA, INSERM and IRD (former ORSTOM). Previously attached to the various social ministries, INED's main supervisory authority was henceforth the Ministry of Education and Research (which pays the civil servant salaries at INED). INED is also attached to the ministries in charge of population questions and health statistics (social affairs, health or employment, depending on the government in power). With the decree of 1986, the pro-natalist objectives of 1945 disappeared. INED's new mission was to develop and disseminate demographic knowledge with the aim of fostering general economic and social progress. Under the decree of 1986, the missions of INED are defined as follows:

1. "INED undertakes, develops and encourages, on its own initiative or at the request of the government, all forms of research on population issues;
2. It evaluates, conducts or commissions all relevant research into population issues and all research contributing to the economic, social and cultural development of the country;
3. It collects research data, centralizes and develops all research in France or abroad relevant to its field of activity, and informs the government and public authorities of all knowledge acquired;
4. It contributes to training in research and through research in its different areas of expertise;
5. It informs the public about demographic issues;
6. It disseminates French demographic research internationally while promoting the use of the French language."

The late 1990s brought a third generation of senior researchers, including graduates of Ecole Polytechnique, of ENSAE, of the Institut de démographie de Paris, and of Ecole Normale, along with several doctors of medicine. A growing number of women now occupy senior positions at INED. Since 1990, researchers have been recruited by competitive examination after obtaining their PhD. New generations of researchers, born in the 1960s and 1970s are now extending the depth and scope of research at INED.

=== INED directors ===
- 1945-1962: Alfred Sauvy (1898–1990)
- 1962-1971: Jean Bourgeois-Pichat (1912–1990)
- 1972-1992: Gérard Calot (1934–2001)
- 1992-1995: Jacques Magaud (1940– )
- 1995-1998: Patrick Festy (1945–2022)
- 1999–2009: François Héran (1953– ).
- 2009–2015 : Chantal Cases
- 2016 - : Magda Tomasini

Chairman of the Board of Administration:

- Since 1999: Bernard Pêcheur, member of the Conseil d'Etat

Chairman of the Scientific Council:

- 2001-2006: Guillaume Wunsch, professor at the Université catholique de Louvain (Louvain-la-Neuve), member of the Académie royale de Belgique
- Since 2006: Catherine Rollet, professor at the Université de Versailles-Saint-Quentin-en-Yvelines.

Chairman of the Evaluation Committee:

- 2001-2005: Alain Chenu, professor at the Institut d'études politiques de Paris
- Since 2005: Francesco Billari, professor at Bocconi University (Milan).

General secretary:

- 2002-2006: Yves Blin
- Since 2007: Bertrand Minault.

== Organization ==
=== Research units and projects ===
In 2007, INED has a staff of 200, including 60 tenured researchers, 110 technicians and engineers, plus around 20 PhD students and associate researchers.

Like other French public research institutions, INED has two categories of researchers – research officers and research directors – each comprising two grades.

As of January 2000, INED comprises 11 research units and several departments (surveys, library and documentation, publications, IT, etc.) A statistical methods department was set up in January 2007.

While maintaining a flexible structure of specialized units (researchers may belong to two units simultaneously), INED has developed a system of organization by projects, built around some 30 key projects which are assessed by the Scientific Council and whose detailed content is presented on the INED website. These key projects include major household surveys and European projects.

=== Leading European research centre ===
There are three other European research institutes comparable to INED: NIDI (Netherlands Interdisciplinary Demographic Institute) in The Hague (Netherlands), MPIDR (Max-Planck Institute for Demographic Research) in Rostock (Germany) and VID (Vienna Institute of demography) in Vienna (Austria), founded respectively in 1970, 1996 and 2002, and largely based on the model of INED. In the other countries of Europe, demographers work in universities or national statistical offices. INED maintains close relations with its various European counterparts, via both European Commission research projects and international consortia linked to the United Nations.

Since 2000, INED has hosted the world headquarters of the International Union for the Scientific Study of Population (IUSSP), of which it is a member along with other national demographic research organizations.

In March 1998, after fifteen years in the 14th arrondissement of Paris, INED moved to new premises in the 20th arrondissement, at 133 boulevard Davout.

=== Difference between INED and INSEE ===
Though government-funded research is not the same thing as government statistics, INED works closely with French statistical bodies, notably INSEE (Institut national de la statistique et des études économiques).

It is nevertheless different from INSEE in several ways. While INSEE is a department of the Economy and Finance Ministry present in all regions of France and employing more than 5,000 people, INED is an institute of just 200 people attached to the Ministry of Research and based exclusively in Paris (though some of its researchers work on long-term assignments abroad). INSEE calculates the demographic indicators of France (birth rate, death rate, fertility, life expectancy) using vital records and census data. INSEE also estimates net migration using administrative data. INED reprocesses these data, adjusts them if necessary and performs in-depth analyses. It uses complementary sources (such as first residence permits awarded by the prefectures) and organizes surveys to collect new data. The scope of the two organizations is also different: INSEE focuses primarily on France, while INED studies all countries of the world.

== Research activities ==
=== Multidisciplinary research ===
Though demography is central to INED, the scope of its research covers all forms of "population studies". Its researchers have very diverse fields of expertise, including sociology, economics, geography, history, political science, public health and statistics.

INED's current research themes, covered by its thirty key projects, include:

- the demographic situation in France and the industrialized countries
- fertility, sexual behaviour, new patterns of union and family formation, adoption
- contraception, abortion and assisted reproductive technology (ART)
- trends in causes of death, longevity, health inequalities
- demographic questions in southern countries (demographic transition, population ageing)
- residential mobility, forms of sociability, housing, housing insecurity, residential segregation
- gender relations (sex discrimination) in northern and southern countries
- economic demography (microeconomics of the family, work-family balance, pensions)
- international migration and minorities, mechanisms of integration and discrimination
- construction of administrative categories in population management, national and local identities
- methodology of international demographic comparisons
- history of European populations
- history of demographic knowledge and learned societies (17th-20th centuries)

=== Global scope ===
Half of INED's budget and research activity are devoted to the demography of France, and half to the demography of other countries. The regions most extensively covered are, in decreasing order, Western Europe, Central Europe, the Arab world, western Africa, Asia and Latin America.

To study the demographic and health transition in western Africa, INED runs three demographic surveillance sites in three groups of villages where it records demographic events and causes of death to analyse ongoing trends:

- Bandafassi (Kedougou region, Senegal), since 1970
- Mlomp (Casamance, Senegal), since 1985
- Bwa country (Mali) since 1989.

=== A central activity: surveys ===
Half the INED research budget (excluding payroll costs) is devoted to major surveys of households and individuals. They are conducted by the INED Surveys Department, often in collaboration with INSEE. Surveys carried out since the 1980s include:

- Couple formation, 1983–1984
- Family situations, 1985
- 3Bis: family, work and migration event histories, 1988–1989
- Local family circle, 1990
- Geographical mobility and social integration of immigrants (MGIS), 1992 (with INSEE)
- Analysis of sexual behaviour in France, 1992 (INSERM survey in association with INED)
- Family educational support, 1992 (INSEE survey in association with INED)
- Transition to adulthood, 1993–1994
- Homelessness, 1994–1995
- Family situation and employment, 1994
- Outcomes of children born outside marriage, 1996–1997
- Anesthesiology and intensive care practitioners, 1998
- Family history survey, associated with the 1999 census (INSEE survey in association with INED)
- Event histories and contact circle, 1999–2000 (Paris region)
- National observatory of cystic fibrosis in France, 2000–2007
- Handicap, disability and dependence in prisons (HID-prison), 2001
- Fertility intentions (3 waves), 1998, 2001, 2003
- Survey of adoption in 10 départements, 2003–2004
- Families and employers, 2004–2005
- "Generations and Gender Survey", an international survey whose French part has been entrusted to INED: Survey of family and intergenerational relationships (ERFI), 2005, 2008, 2011
- Context of sexuality in France, 2006
- Trajectories and origins of migrants and their descendants, 2008 (in preparation)

== INED as a publisher ==
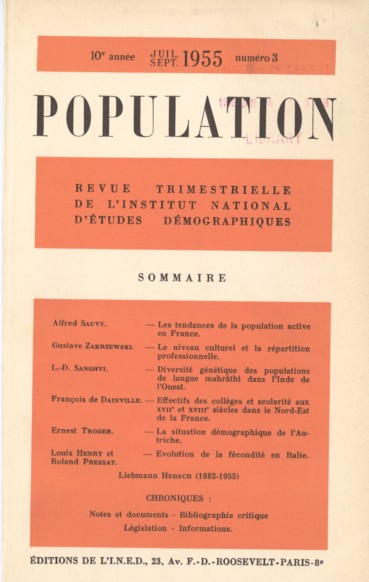

INED produces a range of publications:

- Population & Societies, is a monthly popular science journal (11 issues per year) in French and English that can be downloaded from the INED website from the day of issue. Editor in chief: Gilles Pison.
- Population, ISSN 1957-7966, is a quarterly scientific journal published in both French and English. Editors in chief: Michel Bozon, Eva Lelièvre, Francisco Munoz-Pérez.
- Les Cahiers de l'INED, book collection. Editor in chief: Jean-Marc Rohrbasser.
- Les Classiques de l'économie et de la population, critical editions of historical works. Editor in chief: Éric Brian.
- INED also publishes demographic manuals, notably a major treaty of demography in eight volumes, Démographie : analyse et synthèse, with contributions from around a hundred French and foreign authors and edited by de Graziella Caselli, Jacques Vallin and Guillaume Wunsch (2001-2006). An English version was published by Academic Press in New York in 2006.

== See also ==
- Demographics in France

== Bibliography ==
- Alain Girard, L'Institut national d'études démographiques : histoire et développement, Paris, INED, 1986, 255 p. (inside view, by a former head of department).
- Paul-André Rosental, L'Intelligence démographique : sciences et politiques des populations en France (1930-1960), Paris, Odile Jacob, 2003, 367 p. (historical study based on archives and interviews, with a detailed account of the founding of INED).
