= Penvénan =

Penvénan Perwenan
- Commune
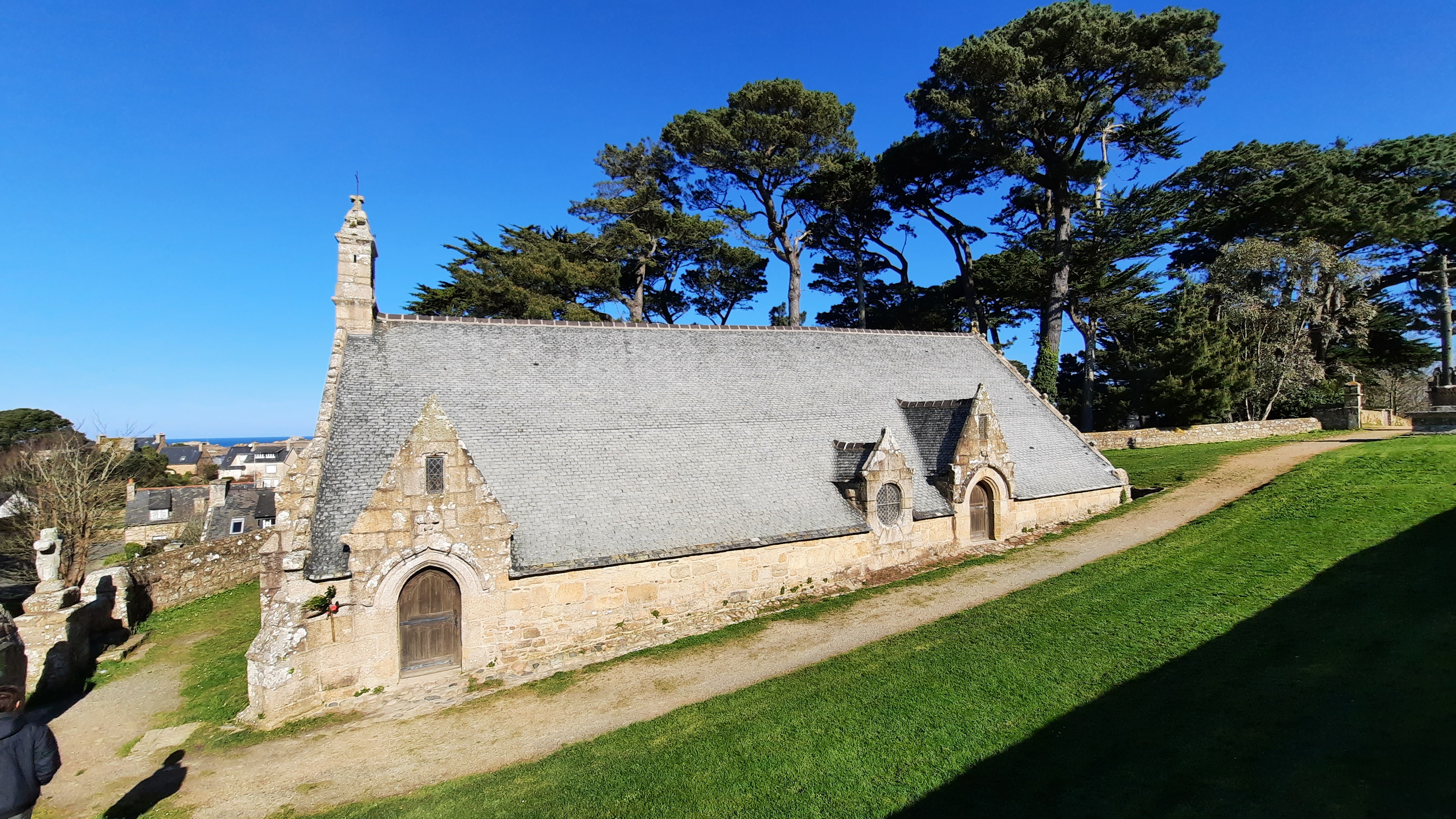
- Notre-Dame du Port-Blanc

- Coat of arms
- Location of Penvénan
- Location within France Location within Brittany
- Coordinates: 48°48′44″N 3°17′37″W
- Country: France
- Region: Brittany
- Department: Côtes-d'Armor
- Arrondissement: Lannion
- Canton: Tréguier
- Intercommunality: Lannion-Trégor Communauté

Government
  - Mayor (2020–2026): Denise Prud'homm
- Area^{1}: 19.84 km^{2} (7.66 sq mi)
- Highest elevation: 92 m (302 ft)
- Lowest elevation: 0 m (0 ft)
- Population (2023): 2,584
  - Density: 130.2/km^{2} (337.3/sq mi)
- Time zone: UTC+01:00 (CET)
  - Summer (DST): UTC+02:00 (CEST)
- INSEE/Postal code: 22166 /22710
- ^{1} French Land Register data, which excludes lakes, ponds, glaciers > 1 km^{2} (0.386 sq mi or 247 acres) and river estuaries.

Penvénan (French pronunciation: [pɛnvenɑ̃]; Breton: Perwenan) is a commune in the Côtes-d'Armor department of Brittany in northwestern France.

== Population ==
Inhabitants of Penvénan are called penvénannais in French.

Historical population
Year	Pop.	±% p.a.
1968	2,508	—
1975	2,614	+0.59%
1982	2,450	−0.92%
1990	2,489	+0.20%
1999	2,434	−0.25%
2007	2,580	+0.73%
2012	2,589	+0.07%
2017	2,538	−0.40%
2023	2,584	+0.30%
Source: INSEE

== Buguélès and islands ==
The town itself is inland, but the commune is best known for coastal hamlets of Buguélès and Port-Blanc, popular tourist spots from the late 19th century, and formers homes of Anatole Le Braz and Théodore Botrel. Charles Lindbergh, Aldous Huxley and Alexis Carrel also lived there for periods. Lindbergh lived on the island of Île Illiec of Buguélès, which he owned. Buguélès is also the location of the annual Pardon of Saint Gildas, a significant religious festival, and of the "sunken" chapel of Notre-Dame. A group of islands are off the coast, notably the Isle of Saint Gildas, containing a chapel from the 9th century.

== Breton language ==
The municipality launched a linguistic plan through Ya d'ar brezhoneg on 16 January 2007.

In 2008, 19.93% of primary school children attended bilingual schools.

== See also ==
- Communes of the Côtes-d'Armor department
