= French Foundation for the Study of Human Problems =

French eugenics organization

The French Foundation for the Study of Human Problems (French: Fondation française pour l'étude des problèmes humains), often referred to as the Alexis Carrel Foundation or the Carrel Foundation, was a eugenics organization created by Nobel laureate in Medicine Alexis Carrel under the Vichy regime in World War II France.

Alexis Carrel spent most of his career at the Rockefeller Institute in New York and returned to France just before the outbreak of World War II. Carrel, who had worked previously with Philippe Pétain during the First World War, accepted an offer to establish and lead a foundation for the study of human problems. Its ambitious mission was to give an account of the "human element associating the soul and the body".

Charged with "the comprehensive study of the most appropriate measures needed to safeguard, improve, and advance the French people in all their activities," the Foundation was created by decree of the Vichy regime in 1941, and Carrel was appointed as "regent".

The Foundation initiated studies on demographics (Robert Gessain, Paul Vincent, Jean Bourgeois), nutrition (Jean Sutter), and housing (Jean Merlet), as well as the first polls (Jean Stoetzel). The foundation employed 300 researchers from the summer of 1942 to the end of the autumn of 1944.

The Foundation made many positive accomplishments during its time. It promoted the 16 December 1942 Act which established the prenuptial certificate, which was required before marriage and which sought to insure the good health of the spouses, in particular in regard to sexually transmitted diseases (STD) and "life hygiene". The institute also established the livret scolaire, (Note: The livret scolaire is an official document of the Ministry of National Education in France which is a cumulative academic report containing the results of a student's academic achievements in various subjects throughout the national compulsory schooling period from 3 to 16 years of age.) which could be used to record students' grades in the French secondary schools, and thus classify and select them according to scholastic performance.

Carrel was suspended after the liberation of Paris in August 1944 and died soon thereafter, thus avoiding the inevitable purge. The Foundation itself was "purged", but resurfaced soon after as the French Institute for Demographic Studies (INED) after the war. Most members of Carrel's team moved to INED, led by demographist Alfred Sauvy, who coined the expression "Third World". Others joined Robert Debré's National Hygiene Institute which later became INSERM.

== See also ==
- Collaboration with the Axis Powers during World War II
- Human enhancement
- Institut national d'études démographiques
- International Eugenics Conference
- Nazi eugenics
- Philippe Pétain
- Révolution nationale

== Works cited ==
- "Loi du 17 novembre 1941 Creation de la Fondation. M. Alexis Carrel est nomme regent de la Fondation. financement, dotation initiale" [Law of 17 November 1941 Creation of the foundation. Mr Alexis Carrel is appointed regent of the Foundation. financing, initial endowment.]. Journal Officiel de l'État Français. 63 (327). 5 December 1941 – via Légifrance.
- Reggiani, Andres Horacio (2002). "Alexis Carrel the Unknown: Eugenics and Population Research under Vichy". French Historical Studies. 25 (2). Duke University Press: 331–356. doi:10.1215/00161071-25-2-331. ISSN 1527-5493. S2CID 161094444.
- Reggiani, Andrés Horacio (2007). God's Eugenicist: Alexis Carrel and the Sociobiology of Decline. Berghahn Books. ISBN 978-1-84545-172-1. OCLC 963478608.
- Terrenoire, Gwen (24 March 2003). "Eugenics in France (1913–1941) : a review of research findings" (PDF). Joint Programmatic Commission UNESCO-ONG Science and Ethics. pp. 1–13. Archived from the original (PDF) on 18 February 2006.
