= Couverture =

Couverture, the French word for "cover", may refer to:

- Couverture chocolate, a high-quality grade of chocolate
- Couverture maladie universelle, a French public health programme
- Coverture, also spelled couverture, a doctrine in common law relating to a wife's legal status
