= Inspector general =

Investigative official in a civil or military organization

An inspector general is an investigative official in a civil or military organization. The plural of the term is "inspectors general".

In some countries, inspector general is also a formal rank or title in civil, police, or military services, where it refers to a senior officer rather than an investigative position. The duties and authority of the role vary by country and organization.

== Australia ==
The Inspector-General of Intelligence and Security (Australia) (IGIS) is an independent statutory office holder who reviews the activities of the six Australian intelligence agencies under IGIS jurisdiction.

The Inspector-General of the Australian Defence Force conducts internal reviews of administrative action, investigates Service Police professional standards breaches and other significant incidents including Service deaths, and reviews and audits the operation of the military justice system independently of the chain of command. The Inspector-General Australian Defence Force is appointed by the Minister for Defence.

== Bangladesh ==
The chief of the police in Bangladesh is known as the Inspector General of Police (IGP). The position is held by an officer from the Bangladesh Civil Service police cadre.

As of February 2026, The Inspector General of Police is Md. Ali Hossain Fakir.

Most Inspectors General of Police in Bangladesh serve a term of approximately two to three years before retirement.

== Canada ==
Before 1867, the position of Inspector General of Canada existed as the minister responsible for finances and government spending in the Province of Canada. After 1867 the position was assumed as the Minister of Finance. Alexander Galt served as the last Inspector General from 1858 to 1867 and the first Minister of Finance in 1867.

== Colombia ==
Colombia's inspector general is a unique post with broad powers to investigate government malfeasance and to bar public officials from running for office.

== France ==
Shoulder insignia of a police inspecteur général (France)

In the French Civil Service, an inspector general (inspecteur général) is a member of a body of civil servants known as inspection générale, generally of a high level, charged with a nationwide mission to inspect some specific services and provide government officials with advice regarding that service. Most ministries have their own inspectorates general, including for instance:

- Inspection Générale des Finances (IGF; Ministry of Finances)
- Inspection Générale des Affaires Sociales (IGAS; Social Security)
- Inspection générale de l'administration (IGA; various administrative departments, e.g. prefectures)
- Inspection générale de l'Éducation, du Sport et de la Recherche (Ministries of National Education, Youth and Sport, and Higher Education and Research)

The inspection générale des Finances is particularly prestigious as a job appointment after studies at the École Nationale d'Administration. In recent decades, many of its members have occupied various high positions in lieu of their traditional mission of inspection. The corps has come under increased criticism for this.

Within the uniformed services, "inspector general" can refer to both a rank (especially within the police) and a job title within an inspectorate general, the best known of which are:

- Within the Inspection générale des Armées (Inspectorate General for the Armed Forces):
  - the Inspector General of the Gendarmerie (Inspecteur général de la gendarmerie nationale);
  - the Inspector General of the Army (Inspecteur général de l'Armée de Terre);
  - the Inspector General of the Navy (Inspecteur général de la Marine);
  - the Inspector General of the Air Force (Inspecteur général de l'Armée de l'air et de l'espace);
  - the Inspector General of Armament (Inspecteur général de la Direction générale de l'armement);
  - the Inspector General of the Health Service (Inspecteur général du Service de santé des Armées)
- Within civilian uniformed services:
  - the Inspector General of Police (Inspecteur général de la Police nationale);
  - the Inspector General of Civil Defence (Inspecteur général de la Sécurité civile).

Despite often similar names and an apparently similar structure, different inspectorates general often have significantly differing roles.

== Ghana ==
In Ghana, Inspector General of Police is the title of the head of the Ghana Police Service.

== Germany ==
During World War II, Colonel General Heinz Guderian was appointed inspector general of armoured troops on 1 March 1943, reporting directly to Adolf Hitler.

Since the reestablishment of German armed forces after World War II, the inspector general of the federal armed forces (Generalinspekteur der Bundeswehr) has been the highest-ranking soldier (four star or full general in rank), responsible for the overall military planning and the principal military advisor to the federal minister of defense, and the federal government. As professional head of the Armed Forces, his position is broadly equivalent to that of the British Chief of the Defence Staff.

In the system of German police forces (Bundespolizei, Landespolizei, and the German Parliament Police), the highest-ranking riot police officer is called inspector of the federal police (Inspekteur der Bereitschaftspolizeien der Länder), although this position is a more coordinating than commanding one. All of the sixteen German state police forces have an inspector, usually as the highest-ranking uniformed police officer. The state police commanders-in-chief (Landespolizeipräsidenten) are very often not genuine police officers but recruited from administrative personnel. The competence for police services in Germany is in general assigned to the federal states of Germany. The federal police is a coordinating police department with a number of narrowly defined competences, e.g. in border control, airport and trial security as well as protection of German embassies abroad.

In the scope of responsibility of the state police departments, the federal police can only act with permission, or request of the local state police.

== India ==
=== Armed Forces ===
The Inspector General Nuclear Safety is a three-star appointment in the Indian Navy.

=== Coast Guard ===
The Indian Coast Guard also has the rank of inspector general, a two-star rank. The coast guard regions are commanded by officers of the rank of inspector general.

=== Police ===
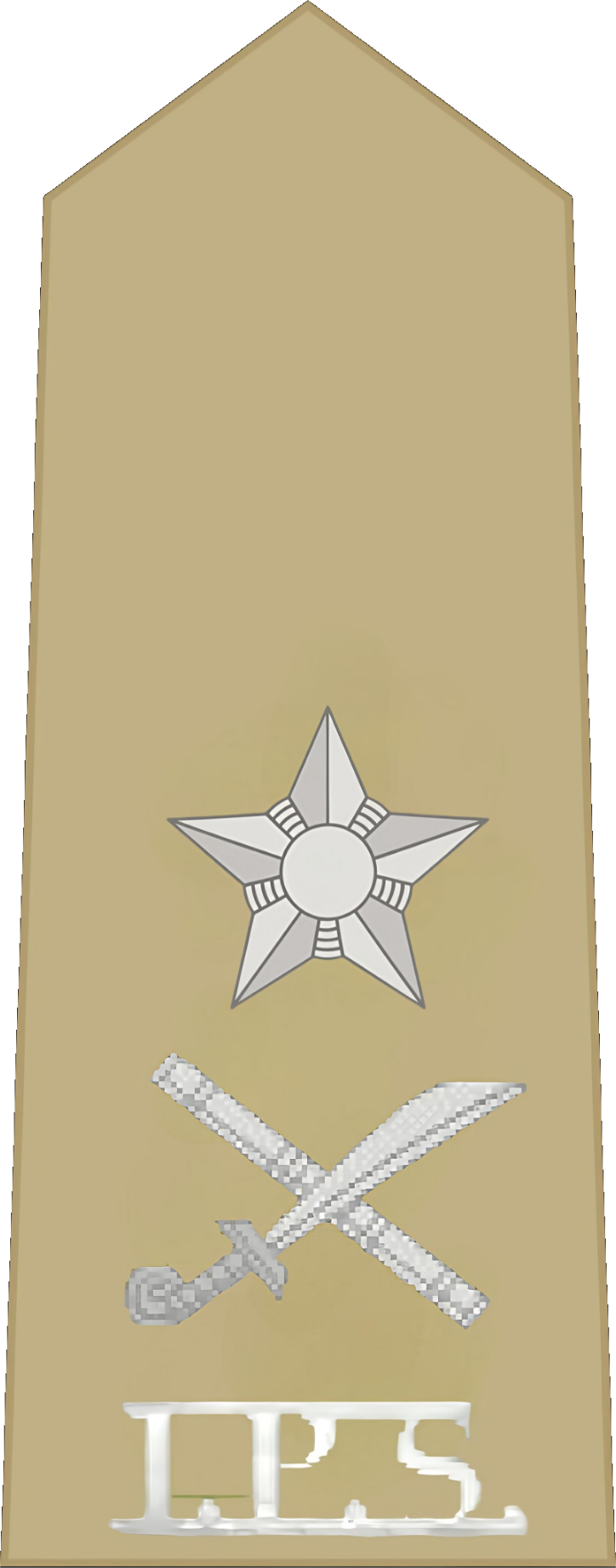
Insignia of an Indian Police Service officer with rank of inspector general of police.

During the British rule in India, in 1861, the British Government introduced the Indian Councils Act 1861. The act created a new cadre of police, called Superior Police Services, later known as the Indian Imperial Police. The highest rank in the service was the Inspector General.

Currently, in modern India, the inspector general of police is a two-star rank officer and one of the most senior officers in the state police forces. All inspectors general in the state police forces are Indian Police Service cadre officers. In some metropolitan cities like Delhi or Mumbai, where a police commissionerate exists, Inspector General–ranked officers are appointed as Additional Commissioners of Police or Joint Commissioners of Police, and may serve as Commissioners of Police in non-metropolitan cities, heading the city’s police force. They are in some states the commissioner of police for the city, that is they head a police force for a particular city. The rank insignia of an inspector general of police is one star above a crossed sword and baton.

In the hierarchy they are below the additional director general of police and above the deputy inspector general of police.

=== Central Armed Police Forces ===
Inspectors general in Central Armed Police Forces (BSF, CISF, CRPF, SSB, ITBP) are either Indian Police Service (IPS) officers or directly appointed gazetted officers (DAGOs), who are directly appointed Assistant Commandants (through UPSC entrance test from the year 2005 onwards). The rank insignia of an inspector general is one star above a crossed sword and baton.

=== Administration ===
The Inspector General of Registration (IGR) is a senior state government official heading the Registration Department.

== Indonesia ==
In Indonesia, an inspector-general of police (inspektur jenderal polisi) holds the third-highest rank of the Indonesian National Police (equivalent to a major general in the Indonesian National Armed Forces). Usually, police with rank inspector-general of police became a chief of regional police department with type-A classification (capital city, strategic and major/densely populated provinces), chief of divisions, special staff to the chief of national police, or deputy head of any agency under the police's territory.

In the broader government context, the term Inspector General (Inspektur Jenderal) also refers to a senior civil service position within ministries and agencies, responsible for internal supervision through the Inspectorate General (Inspektorat Jenderal), which conducts audits, reviews, evaluations, and monitoring of institutional activities.

== Kenya ==
In Kenya, the inspector-general of police is the senior most police officer, who has the overall command of the Kenya National Police Service. In the event of a vacancy arising, the procedure for appointment of the inspector-general is:

- within 14 days the National Police Service Commission (hereafter "the commission"), by notice in the gazette and at least two other daily newspapers of national circulation, declares the vacancy, and requests for applications;
- the commission conducts public interviews and shortlists at least three persons qualified for the position which are then published in the Gazette;
- within seven days from shortlisting, the commission forwards the shortlisted names to the president for nomination;
- within seven days of receipt of the names, the president nominates a person for appointment and submits the name of the nominee to parliament for approval;
- within fourteen days thereafter, parliament vets and considers the nominee, and either approves or rejects the nomination;
- parliament notifies the president as to its approval or rejection;
- if parliament approves the nominee, within seven days of receiving the notification the president, by notice in the gazette, appoints the nominee as the inspector-general of the National Police Service .
- where parliament rejects the nominee submitted by the president, the speaker of the National Assembly communicates its decision to the president and requests a fresh nominee.
- in submitting a new nominee, within seven days the president submits to parliament a fresh nomination from among the persons shortlisted and forwarded by the commission.

The IG is charged with the overall administrative management of the police force, exercises independent command over the National Police Service and performs any other functions prescribed by national legislation. Consequently, the inspector-general reports directly to the president and is also a member of the National Security Council, chaired by the president. Under the IG are two deputy inspectors-general who command the Kenya Police Service and the Administration Police Service respectively. The inspector-general is appointed for a single four-year term, and is not eligible for re-appointment. The inspector-general may be removed from office by the president only on the grounds of:

- serious violation of the constitution of Kenya or any other law, including a contravention of chapter six of the constitution;
- gross misconduct whether in the performance of the office holder's functions or otherwise;
- physical or mental incapacity to perform the functions of office;
- incompetence;
- bankruptcy; or
- any other just cause.

== Malawi ==
In Malawi, the inspector-general of police is the head of the Malawi Police Service. S/he is appointed by the President and confirmed by the National Assembly by a majority vote. In the exercise of his/her powers the Inspector General is accountable to the Minister responsible for Police.

== Malaysia ==
In Malaysia, the Inspector-General of Police heads the Royal Malaysia Police.

== Nigeria ==
An inspector-general of police heads the Nigeria Police Force.

== Norway ==
The army's inspector general (generalinspektøren for hæren—GIH) is the immediate superior of the commanding officer of special forces FSK.

== Pakistan ==
In Pakistan, the inspector general of police (IGP), also referred to as the provincial police officer, is a three-star rank who heads the police force of a province. The IGP is a Police Service of Pakistan officer appointed by the federal government with the consent of the respective provincial chief minister, and holds BPS-22, the highest civil service grade. The rank insignia consists of the national emblem above a crossed sword and baton worn on both shoulder flashes.

== Poland ==
The office of General Inspector of the Armed Forces existed in the Second Polish Republic and was held by, among others, Józef Piłsudski.

== Romania ==
In Romania, inspector general is the title given to the head of the Romanian Police, Romanian Border Police, Romanian Gendarmerie and the Romanian General Inspectorate for Emergency Situations (whose central commands are called "general inspectorates"). The rank of General inspector was also used by the Royal Romanian Air Force during World War II.

== Russia/Soviet Union ==
The Office of Inspectors General of the Ministry of Defence of the Russian Federation was established in 2008, and consists of around thirty retired senior officers. The main task of the office is "to promote the organization of combat and operational training of troops, the construction and further development of the Armed Forces of the Russian Federation, the development of the theory and history of military art, and the education of personnel." It is the successor to the Soviet Armed Forces's Group of Inspectors General, which was dissolved in 1992.

== Sierra Leone ==
In Sierra Leone the inspector general of police is the head of the Sierra Leone Police force nationally, which is one of the oldest continuously operational police services in Africa. The inspector general is assisted by a deputy inspector general, and several assistant inspectors general.

== Sri Lanka ==
In Sri Lanka, the Inspector General of Police heads the Sri Lanka Police Service.

== Sweden ==
In the Swedish Armed Forces the inspector general (generalinspektör or truppslagsinspektör) was the highest official for a military branch or combat arm. The first arm to have an inspector general was the artillery where the Master-General of the Ordnance had this function since 1634. Inspector general of the cavalry and inspector general of the service troops was founded in the 19th century. The infantry did not get an inspector general until 1914. The engineer troops and signal troops followed in 1937 and a surgeon general in 1941. In 1941 the commander of the coastal artillery was also renamed inspector general of the coastal artillery.

In 1998 the previous inspectors general were abolished and the commanders of the major branches (army, air force and navy) was renamed "inspector general", renamed again to "branch inspector" in 2003 to resume the title commander in 2014.

== Tanzania ==
The inspector general of police is the highest rank in the Tanzania Police Force.

== Turkey ==
In Turkey the office of an Inspector General was created in 1927 and disestablished in 1952. He ruled with martial law and over all military, juridical and civilian matters.

== Uganda ==
The inspector general of police is the highest rank in the Uganda Police Force. Since 2001, the position has been held by a two-star military general of the Uganda People's Defense Force.

== United Kingdom ==
=== Military ===
In the British tradition, an inspector general is usually a senior military officer responsible for the inspection of military units to ensure that they meet appropriate standards of training and efficiency. Unlike American inspectors general, they do not usually have an investigative or law enforcement function.

For many years the Royal Air Force maintained a post of inspector general.

=== Police ===
The commanding officers of the Royal Irish Constabulary (and later of the Royal Ulster Constabulary until replaced by chief constable) and many Commonwealth police forces also bore the title of inspector general of police and it is still used in India and some other former British territories.

The inspector general is also the name given to the chief executive officer of the Insolvency Service.

Inspector and variants of it are rank titles of officers in the police of Britain and most Commonwealth countries.

== United States ==
Logo for the Council of the Inspectors General

In the United States, an inspector general leads an organization charged with examining the actions of a government agency, military organization, or military contractor as a general auditor of their operations to ensure they are operating in compliance with generally established policies of the government, to audit the effectiveness of security procedures, or to discover the possibility of misconduct, waste, fraud, theft, or certain types of criminal activity by individuals or groups related to the agency's operation, usually involving some misuse of the organization's funds or credit. In the United States, there are numerous offices of inspector general at the federal, state, and local levels.

The framework of offices of inspector general within the United States government was established with the Inspector General Act of 1978.

== Vatican City ==
In the Vatican City State, the inspector general is the commanding officer of the state police force, the Corps of Gendarmerie of Vatican City. He is also the chief bodyguard for the pope, and accompanies the pontiff when he visits foreign countries.

== See also ==
- Internal affairs (law enforcement)
- Ombudsman
- Regulatory agency
