= Alexis Carrel =

French surgeon and biologist (1873–1944)

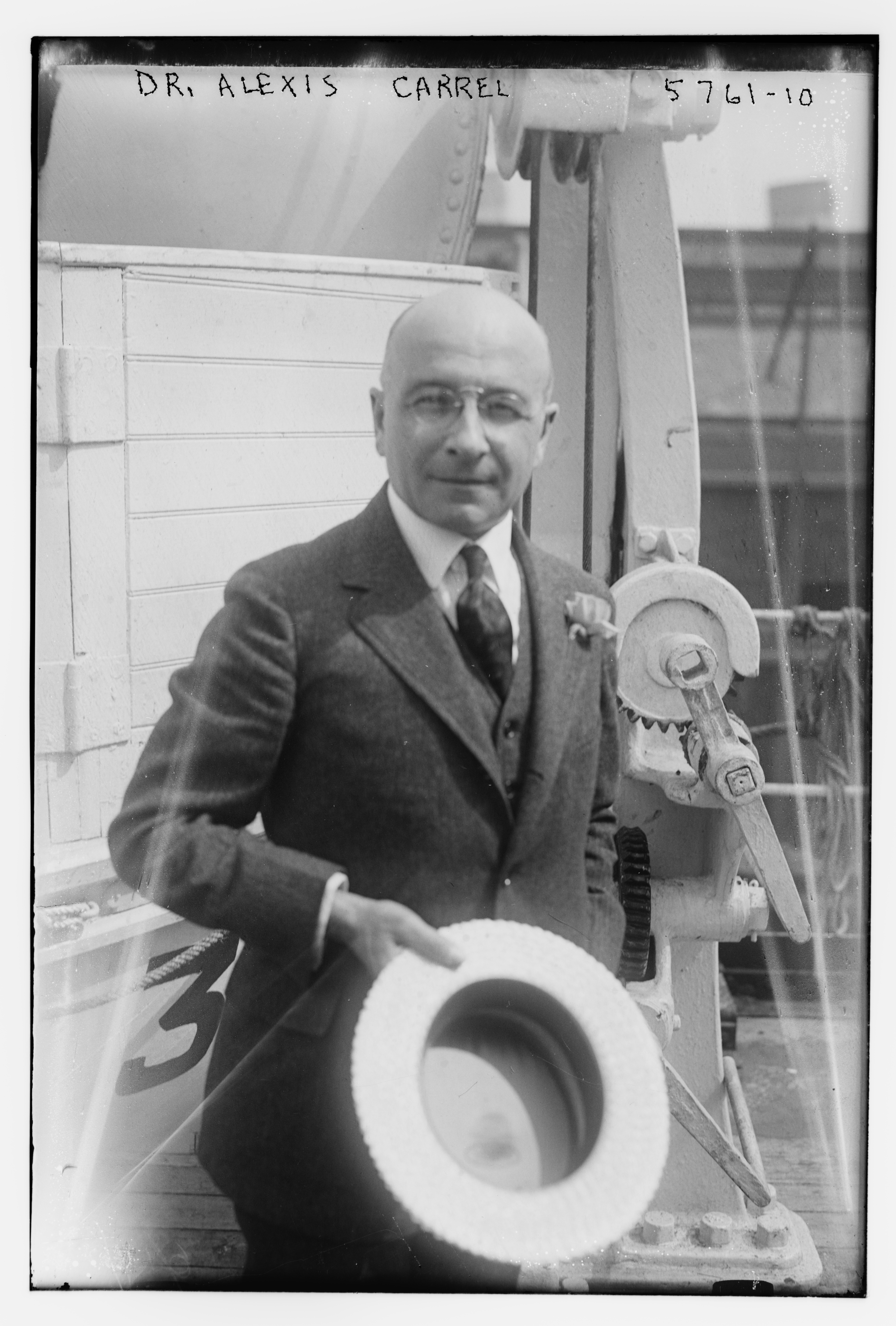
- Carrel in 1923
- Born: 28 June 1873; Sainte-Foy-lès-Lyon, Rhône, France
- Died: 5 November 1944 (aged 71); Paris, France
- Education: University of Lyon
- Known for: New techniques in vascular sutures and pioneering work in transplantology and thoracic surgery
- Medical career
- Profession: Surgeon, biologist
- Institutions: University of Chicago; Rockefeller Institute for Medical Research
- Sub-specialties: Transplantology, thoracic surgery
- Awards: Nobel Prize in Physiology or Medicine (1912)

Signature
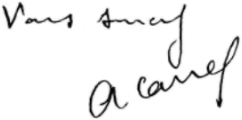

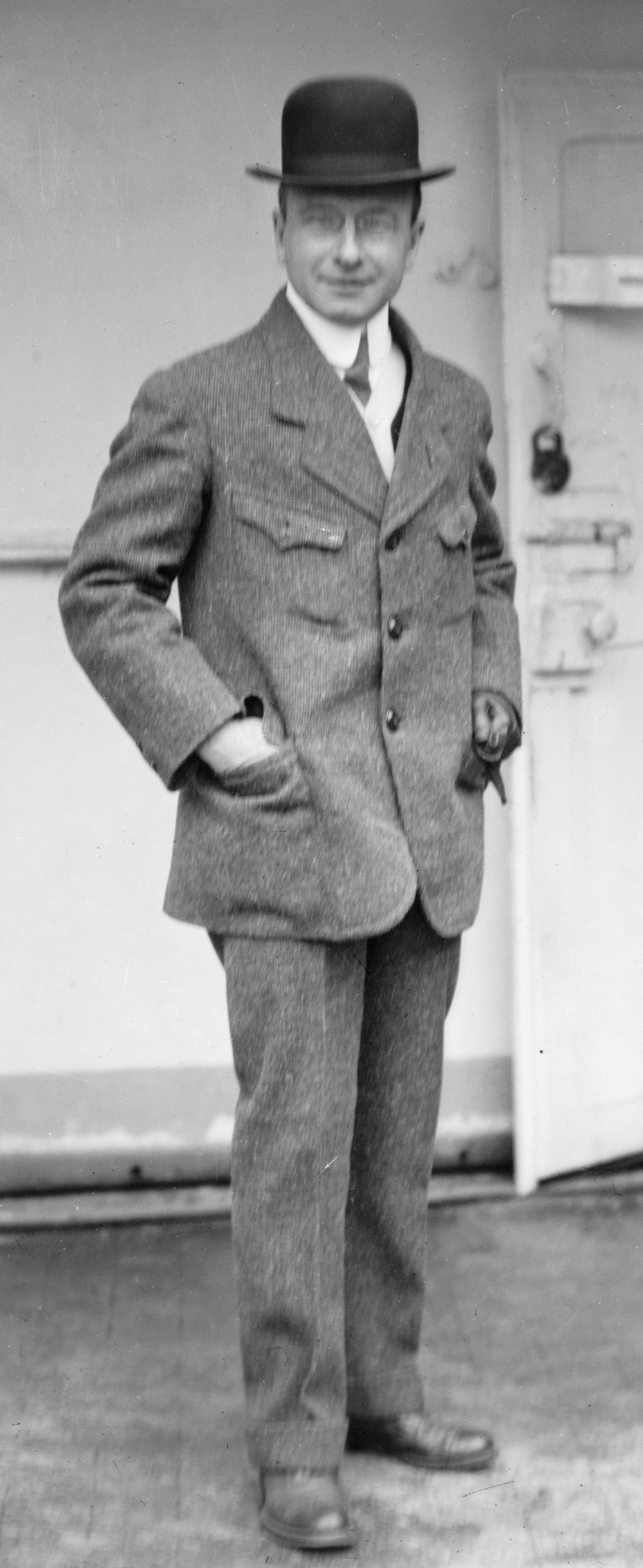
Carrel in 1912

Alexis Carrel (French: [alɛksi kaʁɛl]; 28 June 1873 – 5 November 1944) was a French surgeon and biologist who spent most of his scientific career in the United States. He was awarded the Nobel Prize in Physiology or Medicine in 1912 for pioneering vascular suturing techniques. He invented the first perfusion pump with Charles Lindbergh opening the way to organ transplantation. In later time however, it was acknowledged that Carrel and Lindbergh's version of the perfusion pump, which initially had media prominence, was impractical and difficult to use, and would lose influence by the 1940s. Carrel was also a pioneer in tissue culture, transplantology and thoracic surgery. He is known for his leading role in implementing eugenic policies in Vichy France.

== Biography ==
Born in Sainte-Foy-lès-Lyon, Rhône, Carrel was raised in a devout Catholic family and was educated by Jesuits, though he had become an agnostic by the time he became a university student. He studied medicine at the University of Lyon.

Working as an intern at a Lyon hospital, he developed a technique for suturing small blood vessels using extremely fine needles. He published his first scientific article about this method in 1902.

In 1902, Carrel underwent a transformative experience that led him from being a skeptic of the reported visions and miracles at Lourdes to a believer in spiritual cures. This conversion came about after he witnessed the inexplicable healing of Marie Bailly, who then identified Carrel as the principal witness of her cure. Despite facing opposition from his peers in the medical community, Carrel refused to dismiss a supernatural explanation for the event. His beliefs proved to be a hindrance to his career and reputation in academic medicine in France, and as a result he left France for Canada. Carrel would write a book about the case The Voyage to Lourdes, which was released four years after his death.

Shortly after arriving in Canada, he accepted a position at the University of Chicago. While there he collaborated with American physician Charles Claude Guthrie in work on vascular suture and the transplantation of blood vessels and organs as well as the head. Carrel would be awarded the 1912 Nobel Prize in Physiology or Medicine for these efforts.

In 1906, he joined the newly formed Rockefeller Institute of Medical Research in New York where he spent the rest of his career. There he did significant work on tissue cultures with pathologist Montrose Thomas Burrows.

In World War I, Carrel served as a major in the French Army medical Corps. During this time he developed the popular Carrel-Dakin method for treating wounds.

In the 1930s, Carrel and Charles Lindbergh became close friends not only because of the years they worked together but also because they shared personal, political, and social views. Lindbergh initially sought out Carrel to see if his sister-in-law's heart, damaged by rheumatic fever, could be repaired. When Lindbergh saw the crudeness of Carrel's machinery, he offered to build new equipment for the scientist. Eventually they built the first perfusion pump, an invention instrumental to the development of organ transplantation and open heart surgery. Lindbergh considered Carrel his closest friend, and said he would preserve and promote Carrel's ideals after his death. The pump received significant media hype, which included an appearance on the cover of the June 13, 1938 edition of Time and being exhibited at the 1939 World's Fair, where it was billed as being the "Lindbergh-Carrel mechanical heart" and served as one of the focal points of interest in the fair's Medicine and Public Health Buildings. Despite this, the American Academy of Cardiovascular Perfusion would acknowledge by 2017 that most researchers in fact found that Carrel and Lindbergh's perfusion pump, which was at times also called the "Lindbergh perfusion pump," to be "impractical and difficult to use," and that "by the early 1940s, the pump's time in the spotlight had run out." Carrel would be forced into retirement by the Rockefeller Institute and returned to his native country France.

In 1939, Carrel returned to France and took a position with the French Ministry of Health. Due to his close proximity with Jacques Doriot's fascist Parti Populaire Français (PPF) during the 1930s and his role in implementing eugenics policies during Vichy France, he was accused after the Liberation of Nazi collaboration, but died before the trial.

In his later life he returned to his Catholic roots. In 1939, he met with Trappist monk Alexis Presse on a recommendation. Although Carrel was skeptical about meeting with a priest, Presse ended up having a profound influence on the rest of Carrel's life. In 1942, he said "I believe in the existence of God, in the immortality of the soul, in Revelation and in all the Catholic Church teaches." He summoned Presse to administer the Catholic Sacraments on his death bed in November 1944.

For much of his life, Carrel and his wife spent their summers on the Île Saint-Gildas, which they owned. After he and Lindbergh became close friends, Carrel persuaded him to also buy a neighboring island, the Ile Illiec, where the Lindberghs often resided in the late 1930s.

== Contributions to science ==
=== Vascular suture ===
Carrel was a young surgeon who was deeply affected by the 1894 assassination of the French president, Sadi Carnot, who died from a severed portal vein that surgeons believed was irreparable. This tragedy inspired Carrel to develop new techniques for suturing blood vessels, such as the "triangulation" technique using three stay-sutures to minimize damage to the vascular wall during suturing. Carrel learned this technique from an embroideress, and later incorporated it into his work. According to Julius Comroe, Carrel performed every feat and developed every technique in vascular surgery using experimental animals between 1901 and 1910, leading to his great success in reconnecting arteries and veins and performing surgical grafts. These achievements earned him the Nobel Prize in 1912.

=== Wound antisepsis ===
During World War I (1914–1918), Carrel and the English chemist Henry Drysdale Dakin developed the Carrel–Dakin method of treating wounds with an antiseptic solution based on chlorine, known as Dakin's solution. This method, which involved wound debridement and irrigation with a high volume of antiseptic fluid, was a significant medical advancement in the absence of antibiotics. For his contributions, Carrel was awarded the Légion d'honneur. The Carrel–Dakin method became widely used in hospitals. The mechanical irrigation technique developed by Carrel is still used today.

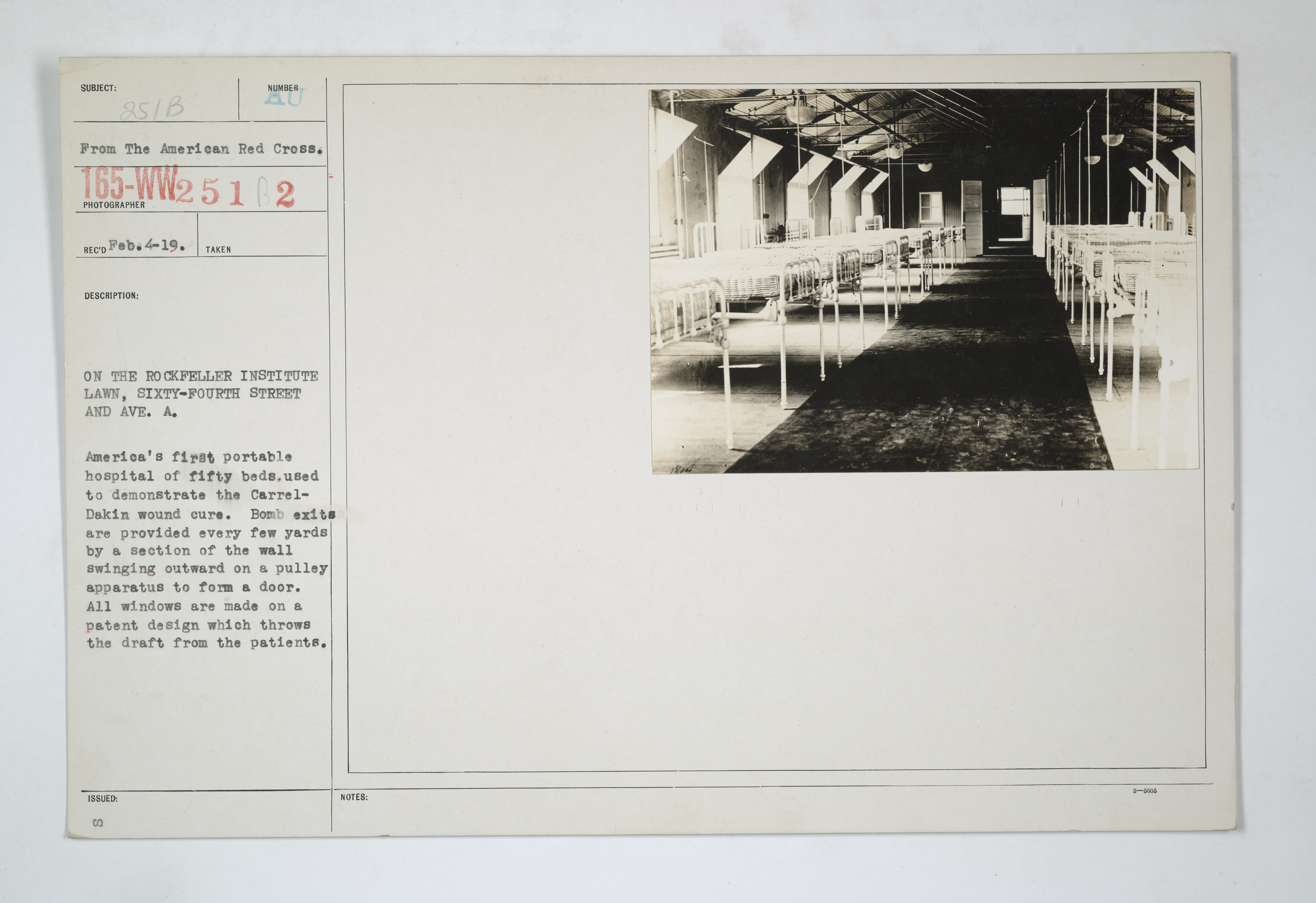
Photograph of a ward of the Rockefeller War Demonstration Hospital.

=== Organ transplants ===
Carrel co-authored a book with pilot Charles Lindbergh, The Culture of Organs. Together, they developed the perfusion pump in the mid-1930s, which made it possible for organs to remain viable outside of the body during surgical procedures. This innovation is considered to be a significant advancement in the fields of open-heart surgery and organ transplantation, and it paved the way for the development of the artificial heart, which became a reality many years later. Although some critics accused Carrel of exaggerating Lindbergh's contributions to gain publicity, other sources indicate that Lindbergh played a significant role in the device's development. In recognition of their groundbreaking work, both Carrel and Lindbergh appeared on the cover of Time magazine on June 13, 1938.

=== Tissue culture and cellular senescence ===
Carrel developed methods to keep animal tissues alive in culture. He was interested in the phenomenon of senescence or aging. He believed that all cells continued to grow indefinitely, which became a widely accepted view in the early 20th century. In 1912, Carrel began an experiment at the Rockefeller Institute for Medical Research, where he cultured tissue from an embryonic chicken heart in a stoppered Pyrex flask of his own design. He supplied the culture with nutrients regularly and maintained it for over 20 years, longer than a chicken's normal lifespan. This experiment received significant popular and scientific attention, but it was never successfully replicated.

In the 1960s, Leonard Hayflick and Paul Moorhead proposed the concept of the Hayflick limit, which states that differentiated cells undergo only a limited number of divisions before dying. Hayflick suggested that Carrel's daily feeding of nutrients continually introduced new living cells to the culture, resulting in anomalous results. J. A. Witkowski argued that the deliberate introduction of new cells into the culture, possibly without Carrel's knowledge, (Note: Witkowski's explanation is actually based on the account of a visiting medical researcher, Ralph Buchbaum, who reports being told by a technician in Carrel's lab "Dr. Carrel would be so upset if we lost the strain, we just add a few embryo cells now and then". After the first six months, Carrel's colleague Albert Ebeling had actually taken charge of the cultures and published several papers about their development, until they were eventually discarded in 1946. Witkowski, in "Dr. Carrel's immortal cells", op. cit., quotes Buchbaum's account. At the end Buchbaum writes that "I told this story, of my visit to Carrel's laboratory, to various people. Dr. Bloom (Buchbaum's director of research in Chicago) refused to believe it. Others chuckled gleefully. Dr. Carrel was to blame only in that he did not keep on top of what was really going on in the laboratory (mostly, he wrote the papers). Dr. Parker and Dr. Ebeling probably suspected something, hence the "retirement". In the interest of truth and science, the incident should have been thoroughly investigated. If it had been, some heads might have rolled, sacrificed to devotion to a wrong hypothesis - immortality of cell strains.". Witkowski also reports Dr. Margaret Murray, an early tissue culturist, telling him that "one of Carrel's technicians of that time was passionately anti-fascist and detested Carrel's political and social ideas" and expressing her belief that "this technician would willingly have discredited Carrel scientifically if possible.") could also explain the results.

Despite the doubts surrounding Carrel's experiment, it remains an important part of scientific history, and his work on tissue culture had a significant impact on the development of modern medicine.

== Honors ==
Carrel was elected to the American Philosophical Society in 1909 and the American Academy of Arts and Sciences in 1914. Carrel was a member of learned societies in the U.S., Spain, Russia, Sweden, the Netherlands, Belgium, France, Vatican City, Germany, Italy, and Greece, and was elected twice, in 1924 and 1927, as an honorary member of the Academy of Sciences of the USSR. He also received honorary doctorates from Queen's University of Belfast, Princeton University, Brown University, and Columbia University.

In 1972, the Swedish Post Office honored Carrel with a stamp that was part of its Nobel stamp series. Seven years later, in 1979, the lunar crater Carrel was named after him as a tribute to his breakthroughs. In February 2002, to celebrate the 100th anniversary of Charles Lindbergh's birth, the Lindbergh-Carrel Prize was established by the Medical University of South Carolina at Charleston. Michael DeBakey and nine other scientists were the first recipients of the prize, a bronze statuette, named "Elisabeth" after Elisabeth Morrow, the sister of Lindbergh's wife Anne Morrow who died from heart disease. Lindbergh's frustration with the limitations of medical technology, specifically the lack of an artificial heart pump for heart surgery, led him to reach out to Carrel.

== Man, the Unknown (1935, 1939) ==
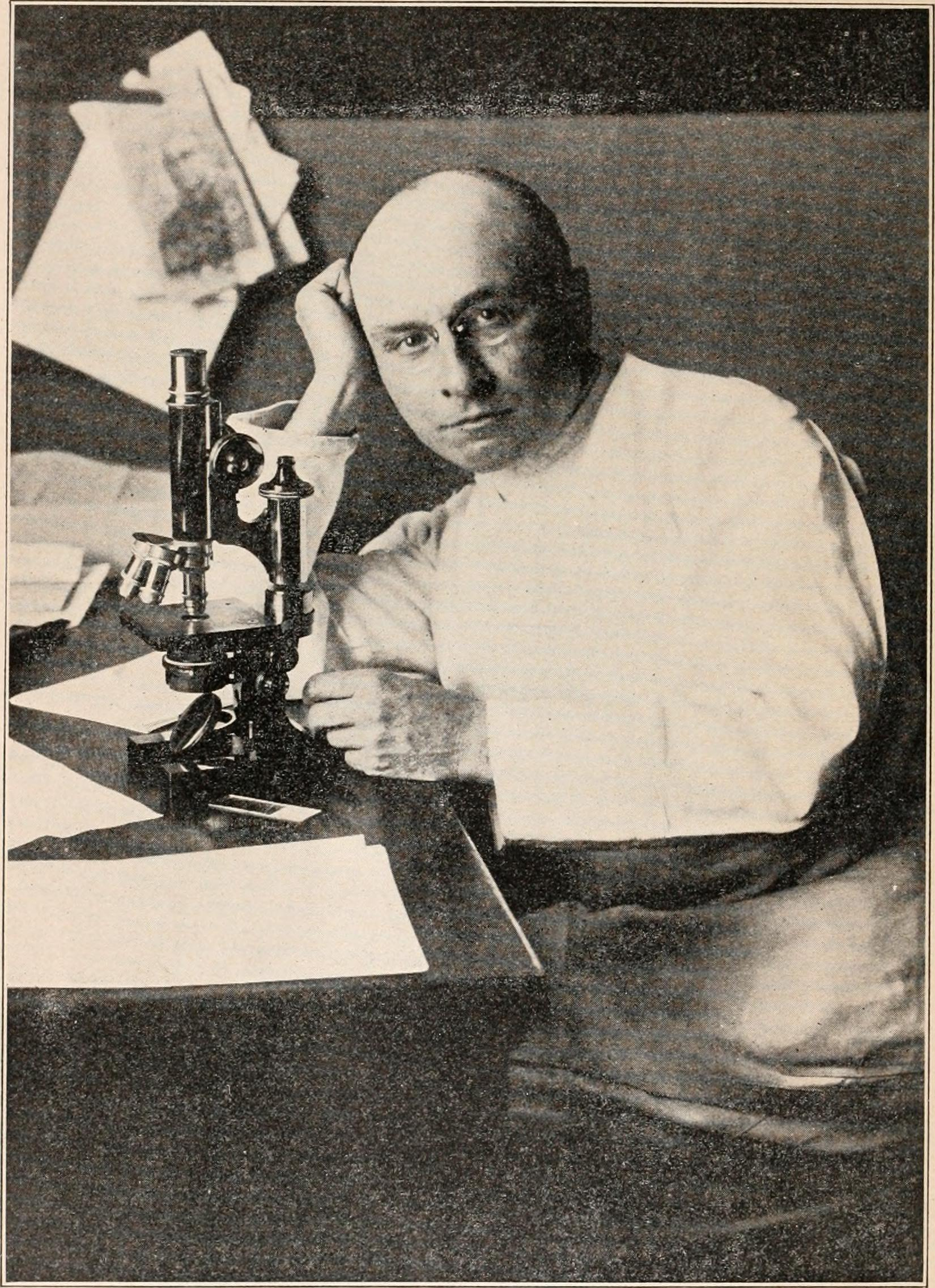

In 1935, Carrel's book, L'Homme, cet inconnu (Man, the Unknown), became a best-seller. The book attempted to comprehensively outline what is known, and unknown, of the human body and human life "in light of discoveries in biology, physics, and medicine", to shed light on the problems of the modern world, and to provide possible routes to a better life for human beings.

In the book, Carrel argued that humans of "poor quality" were outbreeding those of good quality and causing the "enfeeblement of the white races." He advocated for an elite group of intellectuals to guide mankind and to incorporate eugenics into the social framework. He argued for an aristocracy that would come from individuals of potential and advocated for euthanasia for criminals and the criminally insane. Notably, Carrel's endorsement of euthanasia for criminals and the criminally insane was published in the mid-1930s, prior to the implementation of death camps and gas chambers in Nazi Germany.

In the 1936 German introduction of his book, Carrel added praise for the Nazi regime at the publisher's request, which did not appear in other language editions. After the second world war the book and his role with the Vichy regime would stain his reputation such that his name was removed from streets in more than 20 French cities and the Alexis Carrel Medical Faculty in Lyon was renamed in 1996.

== French Foundation for the Study of Human Problems ==
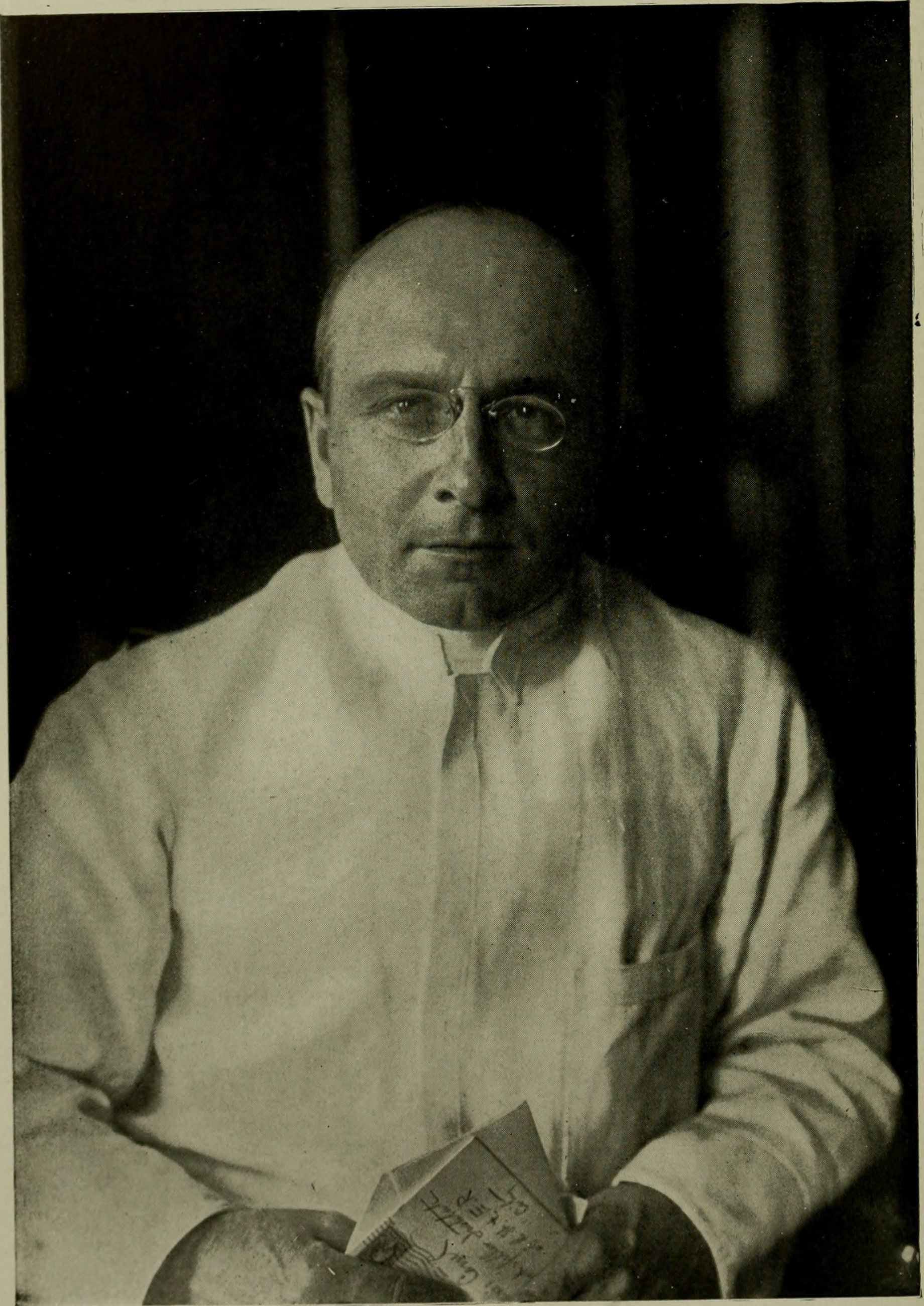

In 1937, Carrel joined the Centre d'Etudes des Problèmes Humains, which was led by Jean Coutrot. Coutrot's goal was to develop what he called an "economic humanism" through "collective thinking." However, in 1941, Carrel went on to advocate for the creation of the French Foundation for the Study of Human Problems (Fondation Française pour l'Etude des Problèmes Humains). This foundation was created by decree of the Vichy regime in 1941, and Carrel served as a "regent." Carrel's connections to the cabinet of Vichy France president Philippe Pétain, specifically French industrial physicians André Gros and Jacques Ménétrier, helped pave the way for the creation of the foundation. That same year he joined Jacques Doriot's Parti populaire français (PPF).

The foundation played a significant role in the establishment of the field of occupational medicine, which was institutionalized by the Provisional Government of the French Republic (GPRF) through the 11 October 1946 law. The foundation's efforts were not limited to occupational medicine and extended to other areas such as demographics, economics, nutrition, habitation, and opinion polls. Notable figures associated with the foundation's work include Robert Gessain, Paul Vincent, Jean Bourgeois-Pichat, François Perroux, Jean Sutter, and Jean Stoetzel. The foundation achieved several notable accomplishments throughout its history. It played a crucial role in the promotion of the 16 December 1942 Act, which mandated the use of a prenuptial certificate before marriage. This certificate aimed to ensure the good health of spouses, particularly regarding sexually transmitted diseases (STDs) and "life hygiene." Additionally, the institute created the livret scolaire, a document that recorded the grades of French secondary school students, allowing for the classification and selection of students based on academic performance.

Gwen Terrenoire's book, "Eugenics in France (1913–1941): a review of research findings," describes the Foundation for the Study of Human Problems as a pluridisciplinary center that employed approximately 300 researchers, primarily statisticians, psychologists, and physicians, from the summer of 1942 until the end of autumn 1944. Following the liberation of Paris, Alexis Carrel, the founder, was suspended by the Minister of Health, and he died in November 1944. The Foundation underwent a purge and emerged shortly afterward as the Institut national d'études démographiques (INED), which is still active today. Although Carrel had died, most of his team transferred to INED, which was headed by demographer Alfred Sauvy, who coined the term "Third World." Other team members joined the Institut national d'hygiène (National Hygiene Institute), later known as INSERM.

== Honours and awards ==
- Commandeur of the Order of Legion of Honour
- Commandeur of the Order of Leopold (Belgium)
- Chevalier of the Order of Isabella the Catholic
- Commandeur of the Order of the Polar Star

== See also ==
- HeLa
