= State medical aid =

French social program that covers medical expenses for immigrants

State Medical Aid (AME), officially known as Aide Médicale de l'Etat, is a French social assistance scheme designed primarily to cover the medical expenses of foreign nationals residing illegally in France.

Assistance is granted because the person has been residing in France for more than three months, and has financial resources below the ceiling for universal health coverage (CMU).

It was created in 2000 at the same time as the CMU by the Jospin government, replacing free medical assistance financed by the départements. Since then, the Right has constantly sought to restrict access, putting forward financial, social, and symbolic arguments. They contrast the fear that the social protection system will go astray, encouraging illegal immigration, with the need to protect a vulnerable population as part of a public health approach. In their 2023 report, Claude Évin and Patrick Stéfanini conclude, however, that there is no evidence to support fears of abuse or fraud,

== History ==
=== From free medical assistance in 1893 to state medical aid in 2000 ===
The precursor of the AME, free medical assistance (AMG) was created by the law of July 15, 1893: it gave the poorest patients free access to healthcare. After the creation of the social security system in 1945, the system was clarified by Decree no. 53-1186 of November 29, 1953, on the reform of assistance laws, article 1 of which states: “All persons residing in France benefit, if they meet the legal conditions for entitlement, from the forms of social assistance [...].” Act no. 83-663 of July 22, 1983, supplementing Act no. 83-8 of January 7, 1983, on the division of powers between communes, departments, regions, and the State, established the Aide Médicale Départementale (AMD) by transferring the AMG to the departments. Law no. 92-722 of July 29, 1992 - adapting Law no. 88-1088 of December 1, 1988, on the minimum integration income (RMI) and the fight against poverty and social and professional exclusion - relaxed the conditions for access to AMD, granting it to all RMI recipients.

Law 99-641 of July 27, 1999, on universal health coverage (CMU), introduced by Jospin government ministers Bernard Kouchner and Martine Aubry, came into force on January 1, 2000, replacing AMD with AME. This law was intended to replace the AMD with a “universal” health insurance scheme, but the condition of legal residence to benefit from health insurance (laid down in the “Pasqua law” of August 24, 1993, on immigration control and the conditions of entry, reception, and residence of foreigners in France) meant that a specific system was maintained for undocumented migrants.

In a report published in 2007, the IGAS and IGF concluded that the existing system should be maintained, and ruled out the possibility of limiting coverage to emergency care only or defining a specific basket of treatments. According to the report, far from being a major source of abuse, the AME meets a genuine public health objective.

=== 2011 reform ===
Under President Nicolas Sarkozy, French Health Minister Roselyne Bachelot declared on June 16, 2010, to the Senate Finance Committee that a “financial contribution from beneficiaries” was necessary, and that she intended to “propose it in the next finance bill” for 2011. The government justifies this by the fact that the cost of the AME has been rising for several years (+15% in 2009, to 546 million euros). On November 2, 2010, the French National Assembly passed a bill to impose conditions on access to AME. The 2011 Finance Act introduces an annual entrance fee of 30 euros for foreign nationals over the age of majority, for applications submitted on or after March 1, 2011. This change puts an end to free access for applicants whose income is below an annually-reviewed amount. In 2011, illegal foreign nationals eligible for AME were those whose income did not exceed €634 per month. With the 2011 reform, only their spouses and children can be beneficiaries. Previously, ascendants and collaterals could also be beneficiaries. The daily Libération spoke of the “anger of associations” at the proposed reform, noting that “making 210,000 beneficiaries pay 30 euros would only bring in 6 million euros.” Others believe that the measure is likely to increase government spending. In 2011, the Besson law on immigration abolished the possibility for communal social action centers (CCAS) and inter-communal social action centers (CIAS) to compile files for access to the AME.

In early 2011, a fortnight after the vote on the reform, the Documentation française website discreetly published an expert report by IGAS and IGF, which explained that the entrance fee was “financially unsuitable, administratively complex and fraught with health risks.” The document, which contradicted the government, was kept secret. The associations denounced a “withholding of information” and a “denial of democracy.”

On July 31, 2012, as part of the Loi de finances rectificative, Parliament repealed the €30 deductible and the prior authorization of coverage for hospital care, in line with François Hollande's campaign promise. The measure is denounced by the right; Dominique Tian (who will later be convicted of “laundering tax fraud”) believes that the AME has an “exorbitant cost” due to “fraud,” and that abolishing the deductible will “create a call for candidates for illegal immigration.”

=== Since 2012 ===
From 2012 onwards, the right-wing has made several attempts to reduce or abolish the AME, but each time the measure has been blocked by the National Assembly.

In September 2012, Jean-François Copé (UMP) called for its abolition “except emergencies”, and the National Rally for its outright abolition. In October, a UMP bill introduced by deputies Christian Jacob and Claude Goasguen, among others, aims to regulate state medical aid (AME). The UMP wants to reverse the measures canceled in 2012 and extend the prior agreement procedure to all outpatient care.

In 2017, the abolition of the AME was included in the programs of François Fillon and Marine Le Pen, who saw it as a “suction pump” for immigration. Emmanuel Macron stood out from the crowd, categorically refusing to go back on this scheme. In June 2018, LR senator Roger Karoutchi had amendments passed by the Senate during consideration of the Collomb bill and the 2020 finance bill, transforming the AME into “emergency medical aid” conditional on payment of an annual fee, and reserved for “serious illnesses and acute pain”, pregnancy-related care, statutory vaccinations, and preventive medicine examinations. In 2019, President Emmanuel Macron denounced the “misuse of medical systems by people not eligible for asylum,” to whom he now wished to reserve the scheme, against the advice of some LRM and MoDem MPs.

Edouard Philippe's government is changing the length-of-stay requirement (from three months' presence in France to three months' irregular residence), adding a requirement for first applications to be submitted physically at the counter of primary health insurance funds, and a nine-month waiting period for access to certain non-urgent care (hip or knee replacements, cataracts...). From 2021 onwards, certain operations or treatments considered “secondary” (Note: Cataract operations, hip surgeries, certain rehabilitations, etc.) will be accessible only nine months after the AME application, which must be made to the health insurance fund, a hospital, or a permanence d'accès aux soins, and no longer to a commune, the departmental social services or an association.

In December 2022, LR Senator Christian Klinger took up the outline of Roger Karoutchi's proposal and had the Senate adopt an amendment to the 2023 Finance Bill to replace the AME with a public health medical aid scheme. Michel Barnier (LR) defended the repeal of the AME during the 2022 Republican Congress; it was also a measure included in the National Rally's program for the 2022 presidential election.

In March 2023, LR senator Françoise Dumont pushed through an amendment to the immigration bill, replacing the AME with emergency assistance reserved for “the most serious situations and subject to payment of a stamp duty.” The aim is to “put a stop to the distribution of uncontrolled aid, which creates a migratory ‘draught’.” On September 17, 2023, Véronique Louwagie (LR) made a new proposal to reduce the number of people eligible for the scheme, to introduce a nine-month waiting period, and to prevent foreigners on the AME from obtaining reduced transport fares. In December 2023, cornered by the right-wing during the negotiations of the joint commission on the new immigration bill, Élisabeth Borne promised to “initiate a reform of the AME at the beginning of 2024.” The bill states that the AME will be maintained, but will be studied separately in 2024. On December 20, Élisabeth Borne asserts there is “no question of abolishing the AME.” After becoming prime minister, Gabriel Attal announced that the AME would be reformed by regulation before the summer of 2024, based on the Évin-Stefanini report, which worried associations.

Under the Barnier government, a review of the AME was one of the first measures announced by new Interior Minister Bruno Retailleau (LR) in 2024. The far right also demanded it, even though Health Minister Geneviève Darrieussecq (MoDem) had spoken out against its abolition a year earlier, and eight former health ministers warned against it.

== How it works ==
The AME is governed by articles L251-1 et seq. of the French Social Action and Family Code.

=== Beneficiaries ===
The term covers three distinct schemes.

- The “common law” AME (95% of AME expenditure) provides conditional reimbursement of the cost of care provided to foreign nationals in an irregular situation, at social security rates. Beneficiaries are listed in article L251-1 of the French Social Action and Family Code.
- The “urgent care” scheme (5% of expenditure) concerns people who cannot yet benefit from the AME under ordinary law, because their application is still being processed or because they do not meet the condition of length of residence in France. Only vital care for the individual or an unborn child is covered.
- The “humanitarian” AME is a marginal derogation requiring the agreement of the Minister of Health. It enables people not residing in France (fewer than one hundred per year) to receive hospital care.

In 2015, the typical beneficiary of this social benefit “is a young man aged between 30 and 34.” Two-thirds of beneficiaries live in the Paris region, Bouches-du-Rhône and French Guiana. Asylum seekers are covered by the universal health protection scheme and are therefore not eligible for the AME.

=== Care covered ===
Since 2011, the AME has excluded care relating to medically assisted procreation, drugs with low medical value, originator drugs if generic versions are available, and spa treatments.

=== Exception in Mayotte ===
The AME does not exist in Mayotte, but care is covered by the regional health agency. People in an irregular situation have no protection and have to pay for their care, despite requests from the Défenseur des droits.

== Cost ==
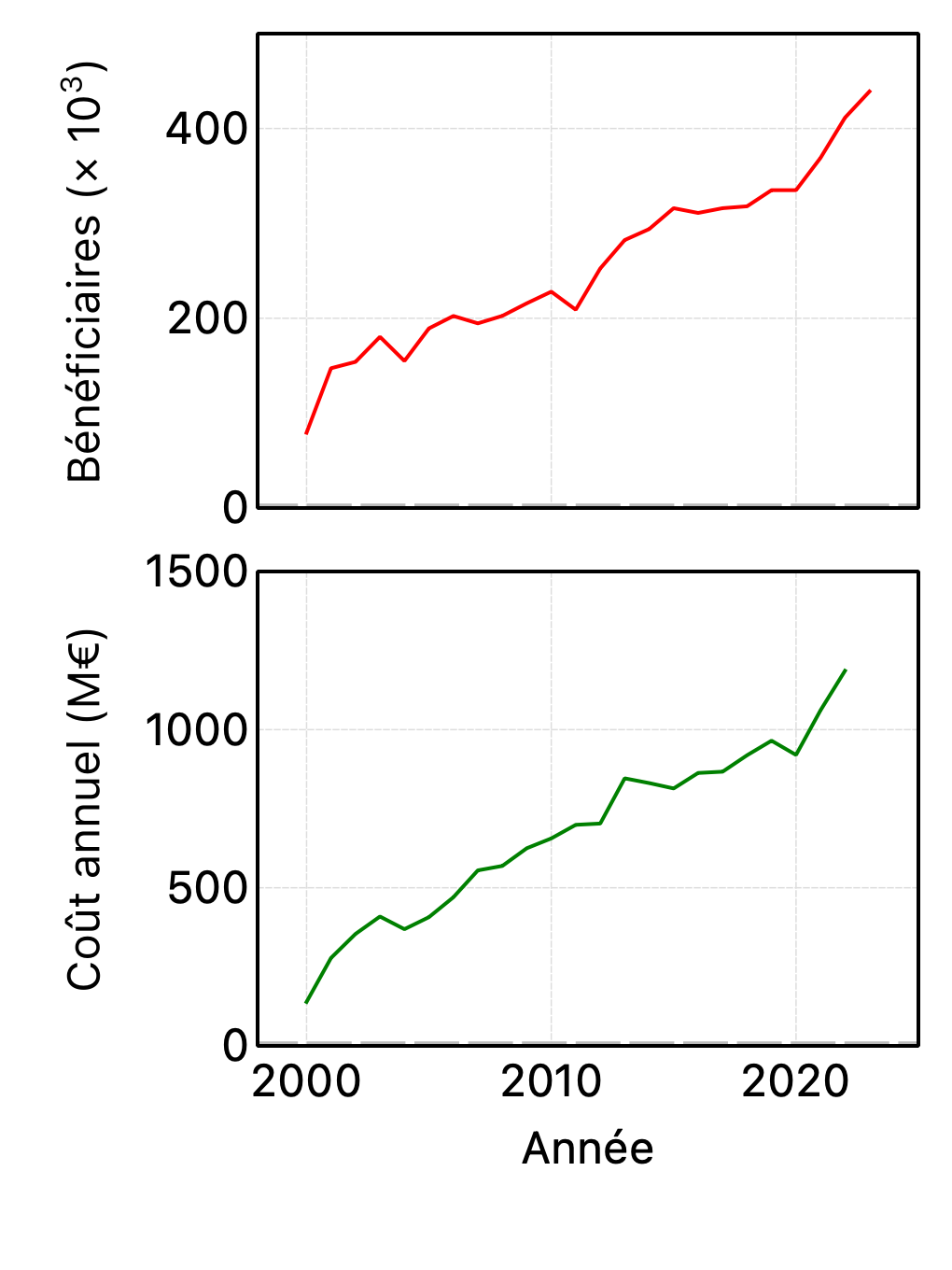
Evolution of the cost and number of beneficiaries of AME in France.

As its name suggests, the AME is financed by the State budget, not the health insurance scheme. More precisely, expenditure is one of the two actions (along with the Fonds d'indemnisation des victimes de l'amiante) of the “Protection maladie” program of the “santé” mission.

At December 31, 2020, the number of beneficiaries was 382,899, compared with 208,974 at December 31, 2011, and 180,415 at December 31, 2003. The budget was €588m in 2012 and €233.48m in 2007. In 2021, the Senate points to the under-budgeting of AME appropriations about actual expenditure, leading to a deficit, as well as “insufficient solutions to stem the flow.” For 2022, the budget presented in the finance bill is €1,079 million, broken down into €1,008 million for ordinary AME, €70 million for urgent care, and €1 million for humanitarian AME and medical aid for people in police custody.

This €1 billion in 2022 is equivalent to just under 0.5% of total health insurance expenditure (€254.9 billion).

== Criticism ==
The AME is accused of abuses and malfunctions, even though it is closely monitored by the IGAS and IGF (which published reports in 2003, 2007, 2010, 2019, and 2023). It is regularly called into question, mainly by elected representatives of the right and extreme right.

=== Unequal access to healthcare ===
To justify this change in conditions of access to the AME, for example, UMP deputy Dominique Tian declared that “a worker who pays his compulsory social security contributions but has no supplementary health insurance is less well covered than an illegal foreigner receiving the AME,” which is false and contributes to the false information circulating about the AME to justify its repeal or changes.

=== Difficulties in accessing the system ===
Sociological studies show that obtaining this assistance is an obstacle course.

In 2019, only 51% of those eligible were covered. Access to the scheme is complex and increases primarily with the length of time spent in the country, but even after more than five years of residence in France, 35% of those eligible still do not have the AME. Fluency in French is the other main determinant of access to the AME, and the proportion of people benefiting from it falls to 17% for those with poor language skills.

In 2023, associations noted the growing difficulties in accessing the AME. Submitting the application in person at a CPAM counter, or in some departments after making an appointment on a website or via a surcharged number, is slow, a source of considerable difficulty, and varies greatly from one department to another.

=== Fraud ===
In 2010, Jean Leonetti, vice president of the UMP group in the French National Assembly, claimed that the AME was being used by “fraud rings.” UMP deputy and urologist Bernard Debré also points to the risk of fraud: according to him, foreigners would like “us to find them a serious illness! Some are even prepared to undergo surgery four or five times” to increase their chances of regularization.

On the contrary, the IGAS and IGF report of 2010 considers that the risk of fraud is low and that the rise in costs (+13.3% in 2009) is not explained by an increase in the number of beneficiaries, but by efforts to improve control of entitlements in hospitals, which enables better recovery of expenses. Claude Goasguen, strongly opposed to the AME, acknowledged in 2011 that “observed fraud does not explain the growth in expenditure.”

In their 2023 report, Claude Évin and Patrick Stéfanini write that the facts listed in their report demonstrate that the system is “well supervised (...) controlled (...) does not generate healthcare consumption revealing atypicality, abuses or structural fraud [even if nothing can] protect against the risks of abuse or fraud in general.” Le Monde sums up the report, writing: “Far from the idea, still stirred up on the right, of a system exposed to fraud, the rapporteurs point out that there is no evidence to support the idea of ‘abuse’, and with 14% of cases audited, the AME is ‘the benefit managed by the Assurance-maladie with the highest audit rate’, even though it accounts for only 0.5% of overall expenditure.”

=== Medical tourism ===
According to Le Figaro, the scope of application of the AME is broad. After three months' presence on French soil, “the AME covers 100% of medical and hospital care (at agreed rates), with no advance payment for: medical and dental care, medication, analysis costs, hospitalization and surgery, certain vaccinations and screening tests, contraception, voluntary termination of pregnancy, etc.” After nine months' presence in France, the scope is extended even further to care for “non-severe pathologies.” After 9 months in France, the scope is further extended to cover care for “non-severe pathologies.” These include operations to remove protruding ears, knee prostheses, shoulder prostheses, hip prostheses, and gastroplasties for obesity. For all these services, transport and physiotherapy are also covered. Until 2011, medically assisted reproduction (MAP) and spa treatments were also reimbursed. In the general press, several doctors have denounced forms of medical tourism at taxpayers' expense.

According to Jean-François Corty, vice-president of Médecins du Monde, the allegations are false: “Some comments by elected representatives mentioning abuses for cosmetic surgery or spa treatments are simply fantasy.” Claude Évin and Patrick Stéfanini also conclude that “the AME does not appear to be an attractive factor for prospective immigrants.” For Jean-François Corty, a doctor, researcher, and vice-president of Médecins du Monde, “the supposed ‘call d'air’ doesn't exist in the real world, it's just a figment of the imagination.”

== Defending the AME ==
Abolishing the AME would pose a serious public health problem, in terms of health, economics, and ethics. Restricting access to healthcare for the most vulnerable would lead to the spread and aggravation of progressive diseases. The result would be an influx of patients arriving later, with more severe disorders, and costing even more.

On this basis, most of the leaders of medical organizations are in favor of maintaining the AME: this is the case of the CSMF, MG France, UFML (Union Française pour une Médecine Libre), ISNI (InterSyndicale Nationale des Internes), and the national conference of CHU CME presidents.

In October 2023, Jean-François Delfraissy, President of the French National Consultative Ethics Committee for Health and Life Sciences, took a stand in favor of safeguarding the AME, which he saw as an indispensable mechanism: priority must be given to respecting the dignity of individuals, fraternity and solidarity. In 2017, a CCNE opinion on migrants' health denounced the “instrumentalization of health as a tool for refoulement”. Other voices along the same lines are being heard, such as those of hospital federations and the Ordre des Médecins, Médecins du Monde, and Comede.

On November 11, 2023, in an appeal sent to AFP, 3,500 doctors signed a “declaration of disobedience” following the Senate's adoption of an amendment abolishing the AME and transforming it into “emergency medical aid.” Among the signatories are Antoine Pelissolo and Patrick Pelloux.

In a press release published on November 28, 2023 (voted by 70 votes in favor, 7 against, and 8 abstentions), the French National Academy of Medicine reiterates the need to maintain the AME “which obeys the principle that guides our ethics as doctors, with the duty to care for any patient, whatever their situation, legal or otherwise.” and concludes “The ANM reaffirms its opposition to any restriction of the scope of care that implies an artificial distinction between urgent and non-urgent care.”

In their 2023 report, Claude Évin and Patrick Stéfanini oppose the Senate's plan to replace the AME with emergency medical aid, which would increase the “renunciation of care,” resulting in “a deterioration in the state of health of the people concerned, possible consequences for public health and increased pressure on healthcare establishments,” and ultimately an increase in the cost of the healthcare system.

== International comparison ==
The 2019 IGF-IGAS report presents the AME as one of the most generous systems in Europe, but this conclusion is called into question in the 2023 report, in which Claude Évin and Patrick Stéfanini compare the French system with that of Germany, Belgium, Denmark, Spain, Italy, Great Britain, Sweden, and Switzerland. They observe “a general difficulty in understanding the systems,” but make the “observation that the French system is, partly due to its centralized nature, the most structured and transparent of all.”

== See also ==
- Poverty in France

== Bibliography ==
=== Reports ===
- Guillemot, Blanche; Mercereau, François (2023). "Rapport sur l'évolution de l'Aide Médicale d'État" [Report on the evolution of State Medical Aid] (PDF). Inspection générale des affaires sociales (in French).
- Azoulay, Jack; Havard, Henri; Sourlas, Philippe; Chambaud, Laurent; Corlay, Delphine (2007). Mission d'audit de modernisation. Rapport sur la gestion de l'aide médicale d'État [Modernization audit mission. Report on the management of state medical aid] (PDF) (in French). République française. Archived from the original (PDF) on 20 June 2012.
- Cordier, Alain; Salas, Frédéric (2010). Analyse de l'évolution des dépenses au titre de l'aide médicale d'État [Analysis of the evolution of expenditure on state medical aid] (PDF) (in French). République française.
- Latournerie, Jean-Yves; Saulière, Jérôme; Hémous, Christophe; Bartoli, Fabienne; Fellinger, Francis; Rey, Jean-Louis (2019). L'aide médicale d'État : diagnostic et propositions [State medical aid: diagnosis and proposals] (in French). Inspection générale des affaires sociales.
- Évin, Claude; Stefanini, Patrick (2023). Rapport sur l'aide médicale de l'État [Report on State Medical Aid] (in French). République française.
- Louwagie, Véronique (2023). "Rapport d'information déposé en application de l'article 146 du Règlement par la commission des finances de l'économie générale et du contrôle budgétaire sur l'évaluation du coût des soins dispensés aux étrangers en situation irrégulière et présenté par Mme Véronique Louwagie, rapporteure spéciale" [Information report submitted pursuant to Article 146 of the Rules of Procedure by the Finance, General Economy and Budgetary Control Committee on the assessment of the cost of care provided to illegal immigrants and presented by Ms Véronique Louwagie, Special Rapporteur]. assemblee-nationale.fr (in French).

=== Surveys ===
- Jusot, F.; Dourgnon, P.; Guillaume, S.; Wittwer, J.; Sarhiri, J. (2019). "Le recours à l'Aide médicale de l'État des personnes en situation irrégulière en France : premiers enseignements de l'enquête Premiers pas" [The use of State Medical Aid by persons in an irregular situation in France: initial findings from the Premiers Pas survey] (PDF). Questions d'économie de la santé (in French). 245.
- "Entraves dans l'accès à la santé" [Barriers to access to health] (PDF). Rapport d'enquête interassociatif (in French). 2023.
- Dourgnon, P. (2023). "L'Aide médicale de l'Etat aux confins de l'Etat-providence : coût, état de santé, appel d'air, que nous enseigne la recherche ?" [State medical aid on the borders of the welfare state: cost, health status, call for air, what does research teach us?]. Institut de recherche et de documentation en économie de la santé (audio) (in French) (1).

=== Other documents ===
- Création de l'AME (2009). "De 1893 à 1999 : De l'Assistance médicale gratuite (AMG) à l'Aide médicale d'Etat (AME) en passant par l'Aide médicale départementale (AMD)" [From 1893 to 1999: From Free Medical Assistance (AMG) to State Medical Aid (AME) via Departmental Medical Aid (AMD)]. cnle.gouv.fr (in French). Archived from the original on 4 December 2023.
- Institut de Recherche et de Documentation en Économie de la Santé (2019). "Questions d'Économie de la Santé" [Health Economics Questions]. irdes.fr (in French).
- GISTI (2023). "Aide médicale de l'État" [State medical aid]. Sans-papiers, mais pas sans droits [Undocumented, but not without rights] (in French). Groupe d’information et de soutien des immigrées. p. 22-26. ISBN 978-2-38287-174-4.
- "Déclaration pour le maintien de l'Aide médicale d'État (AME) adoptée lors de l'assemblée plénière le 30 novembre 2023" [Declaration for the maintenance of State Medical Aid (AME) adopted at the plenary assembly on November 30, 2023] (PDF). Commission Nationale Consultative des Droits de l'Homme (in French). 2023.
