= Montrose Thomas Burrows =

American surgeon and pathologist

Montrose Thomas Burrows (1884 – 1947) was an American surgeon and pathologist specializing in cancer research and surgery. He was born into a Scots-Irish Presbyterian family in Halstead, Kansas.

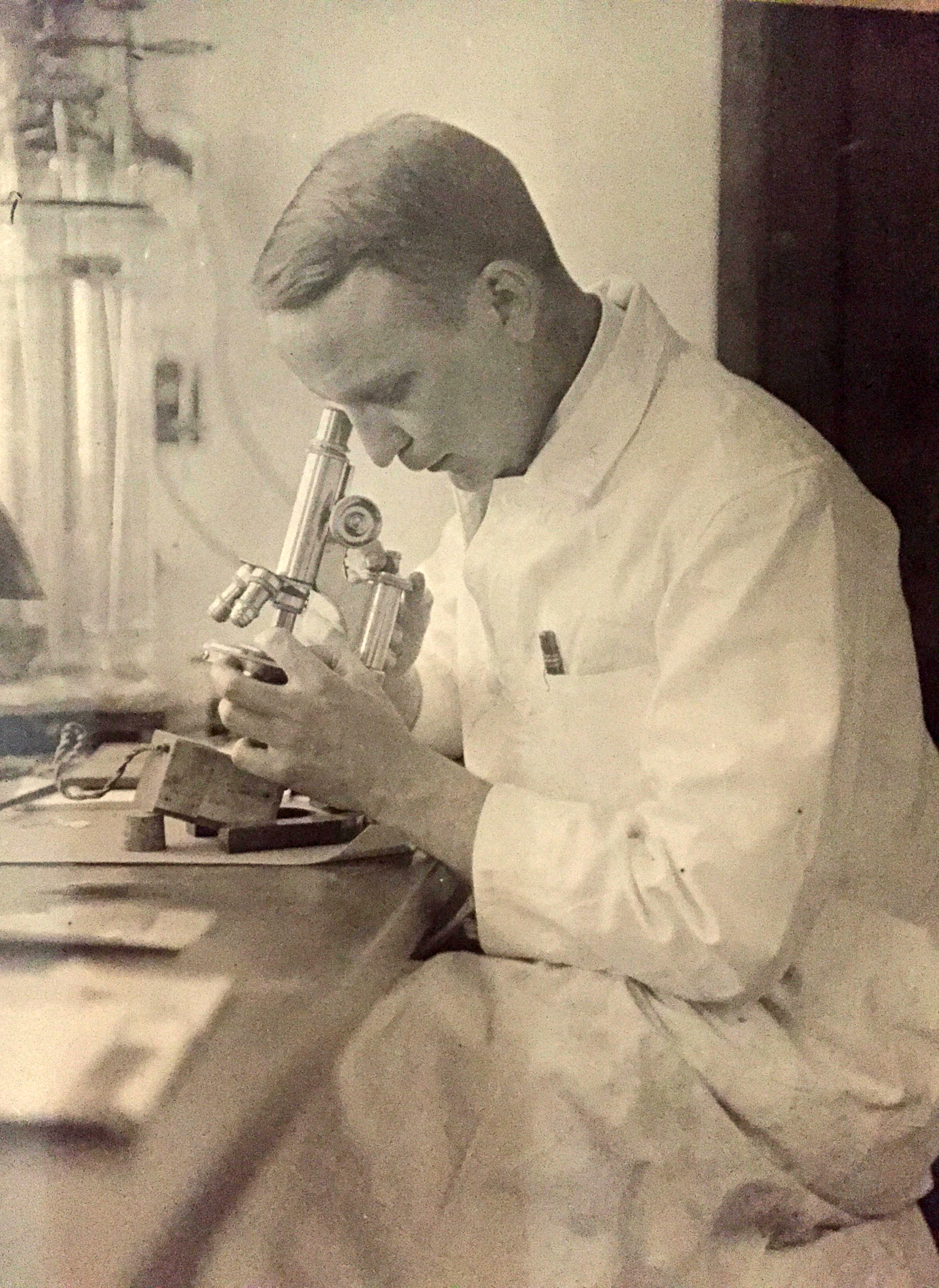
Montrose Thomas Burrows (Collection of Zelta Burrows Reynolds)

Along with Alexis Carrel, a surgeon at Rockefeller Institute (1906 – 1927), Burrows is credited with coining the phrase "tissue culture", and is among the first to adapt such methods to the study of tissues from warm-blooded animals. Throughout his career, he specialized in the etiology and pathophysiology of cancer treatment.

== Education and early work ==
After graduation from the University of Kansas with a BA in 1905, Burrows earned his M.D. from Johns Hopkins School of Medicine in 1909.

After Johns Hopkins, Burrows began fellowship training in 1909 under Alexis Carrel at The Rockefeller Institute for Medical Research (Rockefeller University) just as it was about to launch clinical training along with its program of basic research in New York City.

In 1910 during a visit to the laboratory of Ross Granville Harrison at Yale, Burrows studied tissue culture. At Yale, Burrows also successfully established tissue cultures of embryonic chick cells.

== Career ==
Upon returning to Carrel’s laboratory Burrows initiated Harrison’s methods and went on to make significant improvements to Harrison’s original techniques.

These improvements include the substitution of blood plasma for lymph and the addition of embryo extract in the tissue culture medium that improved the growth of tissue cultures.

In 1911 while Burrows was an instructor in anatomy at the Cornell Clinic, he and Carrel published their combined work. One significant innovation was the method they developed for serial activation of tissues in culture. This technique demonstrated that growth of tissues could be maintained for prolonged periods of time. Among the propositions was the idea that their chick heart cultures could live indefinitely by continuous application of their methods. Their batch of cultures lasted from 1912 to 1946. Because the tissue cultures far outlived their organisms, they were deemed “immortal.”

Burrows and Carrel went on to expand the application of their tissue culture techniques to additional types of tissues including: adult tissues, tissues of mammalian origin, and cancerous tissues from chicks and humans.

Over his lifetime, Burrows’ research carried him to the several medical centers in America. Besides the Rockefeller Institute in New York, he traveled to Yale University, then to Cornell Clinic in 1911. He became Associate Professor of Surgery at Washington University in St. Louis from 1919 to 1927 and Head Pathologist at Barnes Hospital. In 1920 he was named research director at the Barnard Free Skin and Cancer Hospital (now affiliated with the Washington University School of Medicine). It was while he was at the Bernard hospital that Dr. Burrows conducted extensive studies on the etiology and pathophysiology of various cancers and also worked on surgical treatments for cancer, a field of study he pursued for the rest of his career. In 1925 while working at Barnes with Charles G. Johnston, Burrows coauthored the study "The Action of Oils in the Production of Tumors: With a Definition of the Cause of Cancer."

While at Johns Hopkins, Burrows authored several whitepapers, including "The Significance of the Lunula of the Nail," "The Oxygen Pressure Necessary for Tissue Activity," and "The Functional Relation of Intercellular Substances in the Body to Certain Structures in the Egg and Unicellular Organisms." He coauthored several significant studies, including "Studies on the Metabolism of Cells in Vitro: The Toxicity of Amino Acids for Embryonic Chicken Cells," with Clarence A. Neymann, "Studies on the Growth of Cells in Vitro: The Cultivation of Bladder and Prostate Tumors Outside the Body" with J. Edward Burns and Yoshio Suzuki, and "The Study of a Small Outbreak of Poliomyelitis in an Apartment House, Occurring in the Course of an Epidemic in a Large City" with Edwards A. Park.

After he and his family relocated to California in 1928, he was appointed Cancer Clinic Director in Pasadena.

== Personal life ==
Burrows married social worker Flora Barbara Hege on September 4, 1918. They had four children: Betty Barbara Burrows Tanner/Kane (1919–75), Helen Eugenia Burrows Ferry (1921–72), Zelta Burrows Reynolds (1922 - 2000), and Loy Montrose Burrows (1925 - 1989). Daughter Zelta married James Reynolds, son of Milton Reynolds, promoter of the first American ballpoint pens in 1945 and aviator whose crew broke Howard Hughes' round-the-world record for twin-engine propeller aircraft.
