= François Héran =

French sociologist and demographer

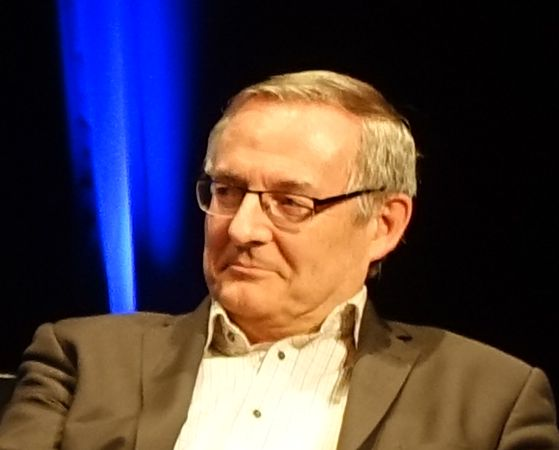
François Héran

François Héran is a French anthropologist and demographic sociologist.

Born on May 18, 1953, in the town of Laon, Héran is a specialist on multilingualism. He has notably worked on such varied topics as: the so-called "sociability" of the French people; the various ways in which romantic couples come to form across various cultures; education; electoral participation; and immigration (especially on its implications for the future within the European Union).

Héran was elected in June 2017 by the board of the "College de France" as inaugural holder of its Migrations and Societies chair, holding the corresponding inaugural lecture on April 5, 2018. In January 2020, he was named by the Porte-Dorée palace as president of its Board of Orientational Advisors (a branch of its public outreach). Decorated starting in 1969 at just 16 years of age, he earned a laureate from the Zellidja Foundation for his studies in Egypt and in Libya; a knighthood in 2009 from the National Order of Merit, and a laureate in 2010 by the Dutch Royal Academy of Arts and Sciences in recognition of the ensemble of his body of work.

== Publications ==
- 1980 : Tierra y parentesco en el campo sevillano. La revolución agrícola del siglo XIX, version modifiée de la thèse présentée en 1979 à l'École des hautes études, traduction par María Marchetti-Mauri, ministère espagnol de l'Agriculture, coll. « Estudios »
- 1990 : Le Bourgeois de Séville : Terre et parenté en Andalousie, refonte de la version espagnole de 1980, Presses universitaires de France, coll. « Ethnologies » ISBN 978-2130422600
- 1994 : Les Efforts éducatifs des familles, with Claude Gissot et Nicole Manon, INSEE, coll. « Insee-Résultats », série « Consommation-Modes de vie » ISBN 978-2110662019
- 2006 : La Formation du couple. Textes essentiels pour la sociologie de la famille, with Michel Bozon, La Découverte, coll. « Les grands repères », série « Textes essentiels pour la sociologie de la famille » ISBN 978-2707148278
- 2007 : Le Temps des immigrés : Essai sur le destin de la population française, Le Seuil, coll. « La République des idées » ISBN 978-2020922463 (traduction japonaise en 2009 avec préface inédite)
- 2009 : Figures de la parenté. Une histoire critique de la raison structurale, Presses universitaires de France, coll. « Sociologies » ISBN 978-2130570363
- 2016 : Trajectoires et origines : Enquête sur la diversité des populations en France, sous la direction de Cris Beauchemin, Christelle Hamel et Patrick Simon de l'INED et de l'INSEE, préface, INED ISBN 978-2-7332-8004-1
- 2016 : Parlons de l'immigration en trente questions, 2^{e} édition refondue (1^{re} édition en 2012), La Documentation française ISBN 978-2-11-009975-4
- 2017 : Avec l'immigration : Mesurer, débattre, agir, La Découverte, coll. « L’envers des faits » ISBN 978-2-7071-9024-6
- 2018 : Migrations et sociétés, Fayard / Collège de France ISBN 978-2213711737
- 2021 : Lettre aux professeurs sur la liberté d'expression, La Découverte
