= Institut français d'opinion publique =

French international polling and market research firm

Logo IFOP

The Institut français d'opinion publique (IFOP; English: French Institute of Public Opinion) is an international polling and market research firm, whose motto is "Connection creates value".

It was founded on 1 December 1938 by Jean Stoetzel, former Sorbonne professor, after he met George Gallup in the United States. Its CEO was Laurence Parisot from 1990 until 2016, who was nicknamed "boss of the bosses", when she was the leader of the Mouvement des Entreprises de France, the French employers' trade union. The IFOP sells polls to firms and political parties.

IFOP is also a source of data in France for the SNEP music charts.

== Cultural impact ==
In Jean-Luc Godard's 1966 movie Masculin Féminin, Jean-Pierre Léaud's character Paul is an IFOP pollster.
