= Île Illiec =

Island in Côtes-d'Armor, France

Coordinates: 48°51′01″N 3°17′43″W

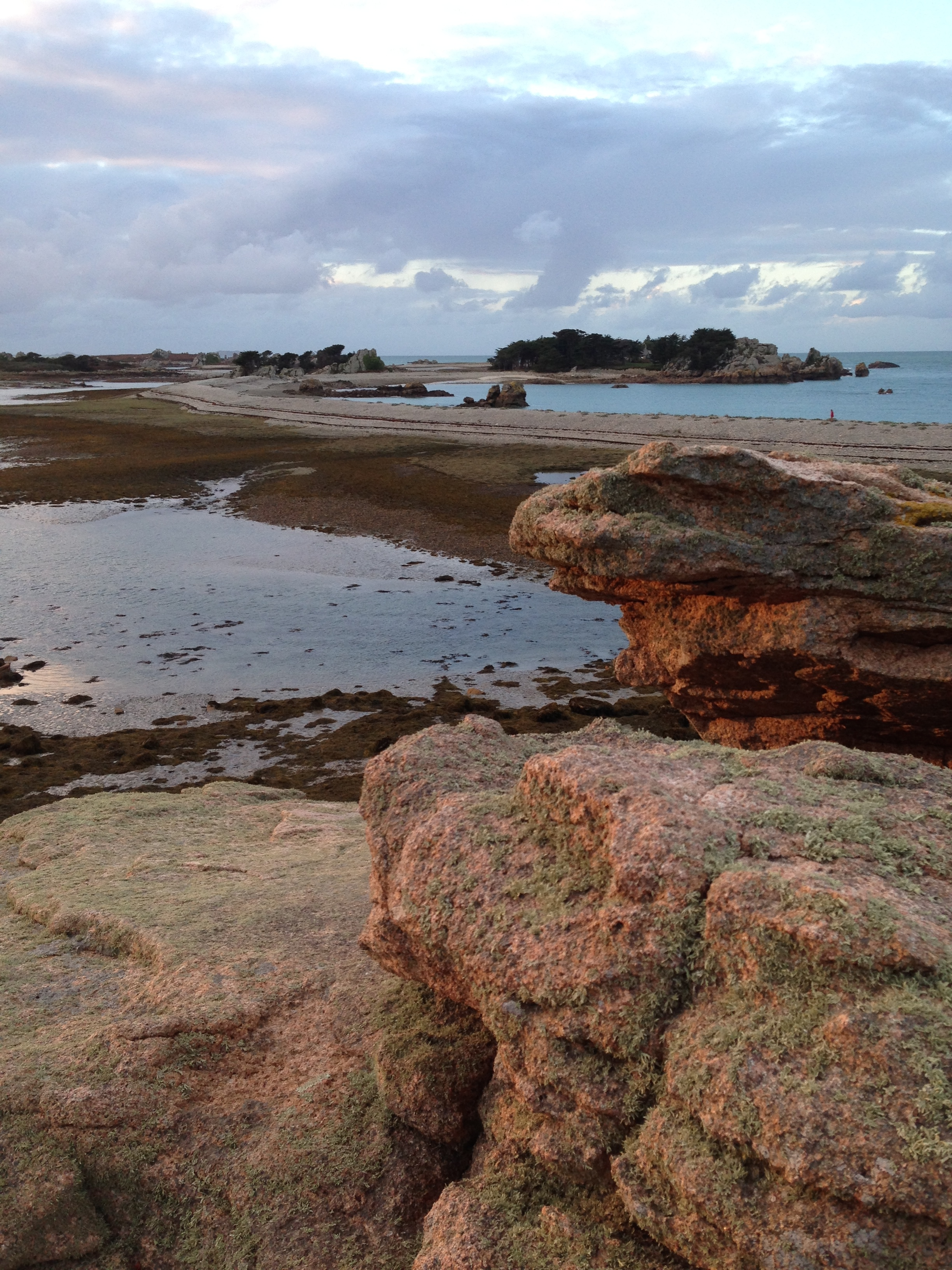

Île Illiec (Enez Ilieg in Breton) is a small island located off the coast of Port-Blanc, Brittany, France.

In 1876, Ambroise Thomas constructed the three-storey house, chapel and conical tower that all currently stand on the island.

Île Illiec was purchased by the American aviator Charles Lindbergh, following the kidnapping and murder of his son in 1932 and his subsequent move to Europe in 1936. In March 1938, the family bought the 4 acre (≈16 000 m² or 127 x 127 m) island for $16,000, a cost of approximately $1 per square metre, but lived there only until December. The Lindbergh family returned to the USA in April 1939, shortly after the German occupation of Czechoslovakia.

The island's inside is now privately owned by the Heidsieck family.
