= Couverture maladie universelle =

French social welfare programme

The French Universal Health Coverage (French: Couverture maladie universelle, abbreviated as "CMU") is the French social security program concerning health care, which was implemented in January 2000 (loi n^{o} 99-641 du 27 juillet 1999).

It was drafted by Prime Minister Lionel Jospin's leftist government in 1999, on the initiative of Minister of Social Affairs and Employment Martine Aubry.

In compliance with this program, medical expenses are reimbursed to all people who have been legally residing in France for over 3 months, whereas illegal immigrants are entitled to State medical aid (aide médicale d'État, abbreviated as "AME").

An investigation completed in 2006 by non-governmental organization Médecins du Monde showed that approximately 10% of French physicians refused to treat patients covered by the CMU, while 40% refused to treat patients covered by the AME.
