= Jean Stoetzel =

French sociologist

Jean Stoetzel (23 April 1910, Saint-Dié-des-Vosges – 21 February 1987, Boulogne-Billancourt) was a French sociologist.

== Biography ==
He had Alsacian and Lorrainian descent.

Stoetzel had studied in Lycée Louis-le-Grand, in a preparatory class for superior schools (écoles supérieures)

In 1932, he entered École normale supérieure in Paris.

In 1938, he visited Columbia University in New York City. There he get to know the methods of opinion polling by George Gallup.

Upon return to France, he founded Institut français d'opinion publique, the first French organization to conduct opinion polling. Amongst the questions asked were the position of French on Édouard Daladier's politics with respect to "German threat", the opinion of birth rate decline, etc. Although Stoetzel methods were quite crude, he managed to detect rightward shift in French public mood.

During World War II, he was a liaison officer with British army and fought in Battle of Dunkirk. Afterwards, he returned to occupied France and taught philosophy in a secondary school.

Stoetzel became a Doctor of Philosophy in 1943. He was a sociology professor at the University of Bordeaux 1943–1954, and he was a social psychology professor at the University of Paris 1955–1978.

In 1977, Stoetzel was elected a member of Académie des Sciences Morales et Politiques. He was elected to the American Philosophical Society in 1979.
