= IGAS =

Agency overview
- Formed: 1967
- Jurisdiction: France

L’Inspection générale des affaires sociales (IGAS) (English: General Inspectorate of Social Affairs) is a French government agency which is responsible for conducting inspections and evaluations in a across various fields, including social affairs, health, social protection ('solidarité'), employment, labor, community politics, professional structures and modernisation of the state. It was founded in 1967.

IGAS employs 125 inspectors and 30 administrative staff. The inspectors lead audits and inspections, conduct evaluations, offer consulting and interim management. It has jurisdiction over public institutions - government, regional and local authorities, agencies - as well as private companies, NGOs or charities if they receive public funding or sponsoring. Since 2009 the leader of the institution is Pierre Boissier.
