= François Perroux =

French economist (1903–1987)

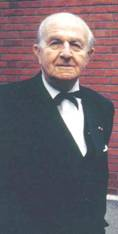
François Perroux.

François Perroux (December 19, 1903 – June 2, 1987) was a French economist. He was named Professor at the Collège de France, after having taught at the University of Lyon (1928–1937) and the University of Paris (1935–1955). He founded the Institut de Sciences Economiques Appliquées in 1944. He was an outspoken supporter of corporatism.

Perroux was born in Saint-Romain-en-Gal in 1903. He was critical of the leading financial and economic policies toward the Third World during the half-century of his career. He said that they took insufficient account of the originality, culture, and concrete situations of the countries concerned, and were too quantitative, too Western in concept, and too centered on the interests of the rich industrialised countries. Perroux counselled the peoples of the Third World to build upon their cultures, their social organisations, and their resources, so as to better the internal coherence of their economies and reduce the effects of domination by the exterior.

In the field of Regional Economics, one of his main contribution's was the concept of poles de croissance or 'growth poles'. It implied that Government policies aimed at the regeneration of a specific local region were critically dependent upon the Input-Output linkages associated with the industry. A 'pole de croissance' is an industry, or group of related industries, that have growth rates above the national average and the capacity to generate growth through the impact of strong input-output linkages.

Perroux died in Stains in 1987.

== Sources ==
Association des Amis de François Perroux, Journée François Perroux, published around early 2008; retrieved July 2009.
