= Islam in France =

French Muslims
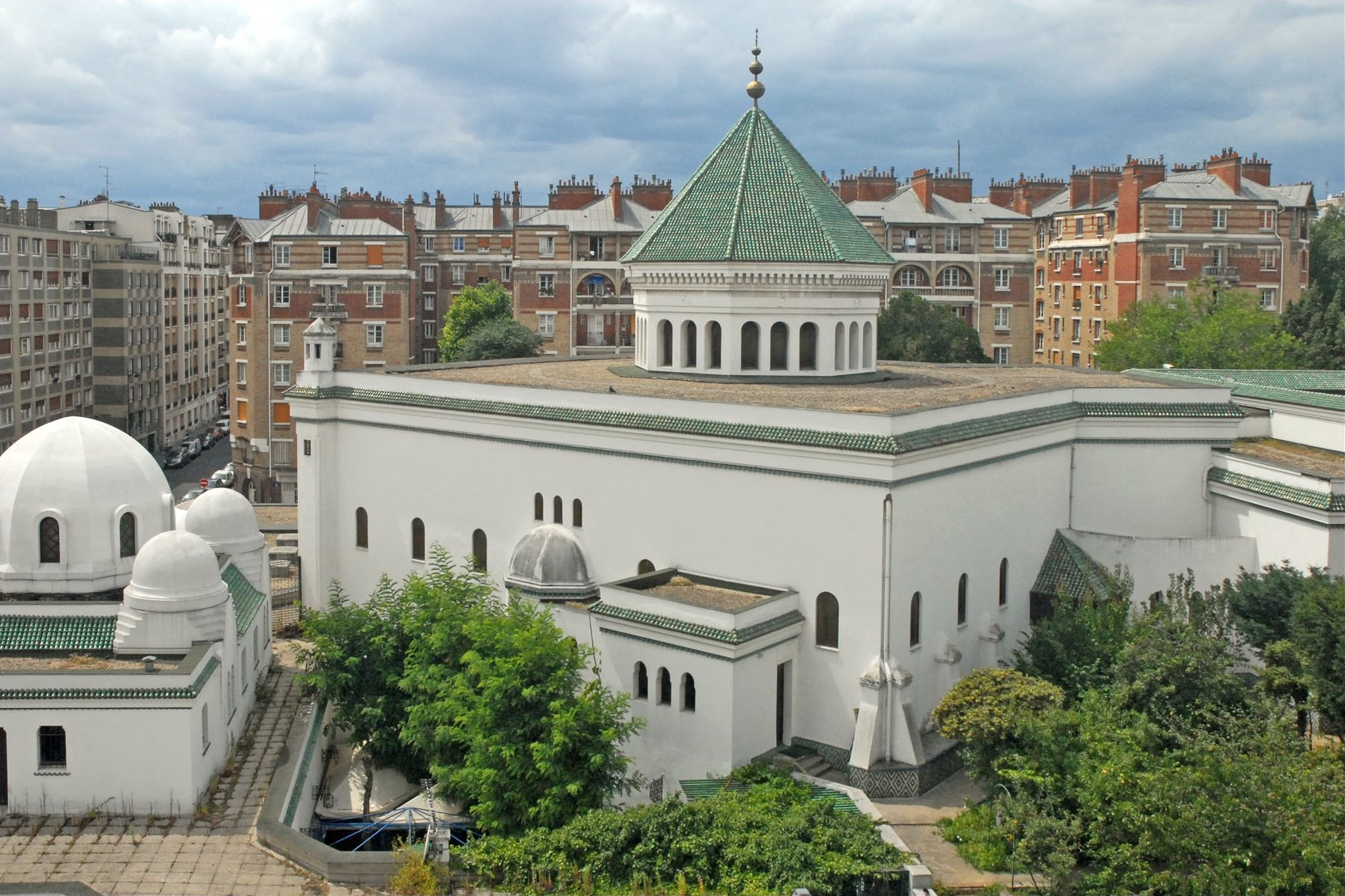
- Grand Mosque, Paris

Total population
- 10% of the population in 2019–2020 according to the data from INSEE

Founder
- Muhammad

Regions with significant populations
- Île-de-France, Provence-Alpes-Côte d'Azur, Auvergne-Rhône-Alpes, Hauts-de-France, Mayotte

Religions
- Predominantly:- Sunni Islam; Minority:- Shia Islam, Sufism and Ibadism

Scriptures
- Quran • Hadith

Languages
- Mainly French. Also Arabic, Amazigh, Turkish, other languages.

Islam in Europe by percentage of country population 95–100%: Azerbaijan; 90–95%: Turkey; Kosovo; 50–70%: Albania; Bosnia and Herzegovina; Kazakhstan; 30–35%: North Macedonia; 10–20%: France; Sweden; Georgia; Montenegro; 5–10%: Austria; Belgium; Bulgaria; Denmark; Germany; Liechtenstein; Luxembourg; Netherlands; Russia; Switzerland; United Kingdom; Spain; Greece; 4–5%: Serbia; 2–4%: Italy; Finland; Norway; Malta; Slovenia; Cyprus (Note: Only takes into account the Muslim population residing on land controlled by the Republic of Cyprus.); 1–2%: Croatia; Ireland; Ukraine; Andorra; < 1%: Iceland; Armenia; Belarus; Czech Republic; Estonia; Hungary; Latvia; Lithuania; Moldova; Monaco; Poland; Portugal; Romania; San Marino; Slovakia

Islam is the second-largest religion in France after Christianity. As of the most recent estimates, it is followed by approximately 10% of the population aged 18–59 in 2019–2020—according to data from INSEE.

The majority of Muslims in France belong to the Sunni denomination and are of various foreign origins (Maghrebi, Levantine, Balkan, sub-Saharan, etc). Sizeable minorities of Shia and non-denominational Muslims also exist. The French overseas region of Mayotte has a majority Muslim population, with 97% of the population following Islam.

A report from the French Institute of Statistics in 2024 have reported that 76% of Muslims in France believe that religion is very important while 24% have stated religion played a somewhat important part and role in their life. The INSEE and the National Institute for Demographic Studies in France found that the use of the veil for Muslim women has increased by 55% from 2009 to 2020. There has been an observable increase among all geographic origins, of Muslim women, and among second and third generations of Muslim women, in France.

According to a survey in which 536 people of Muslim origin participated, 39% of Muslims in France surveyed by the polling group IFOP said they observed Islam's five prayers daily in 2008, a steady rise from 31% in 1994, according to the study published in the Catholic daily La Croix. Mosque attendance for Friday prayers had risen to 23% in 2008, up from 16% in 1994, while Ramadan observance has reached 70% in 2008 compared to 60% in 1994. Alcohol consumption also declined from 39% to 34%.

== History ==
=== Early history ===
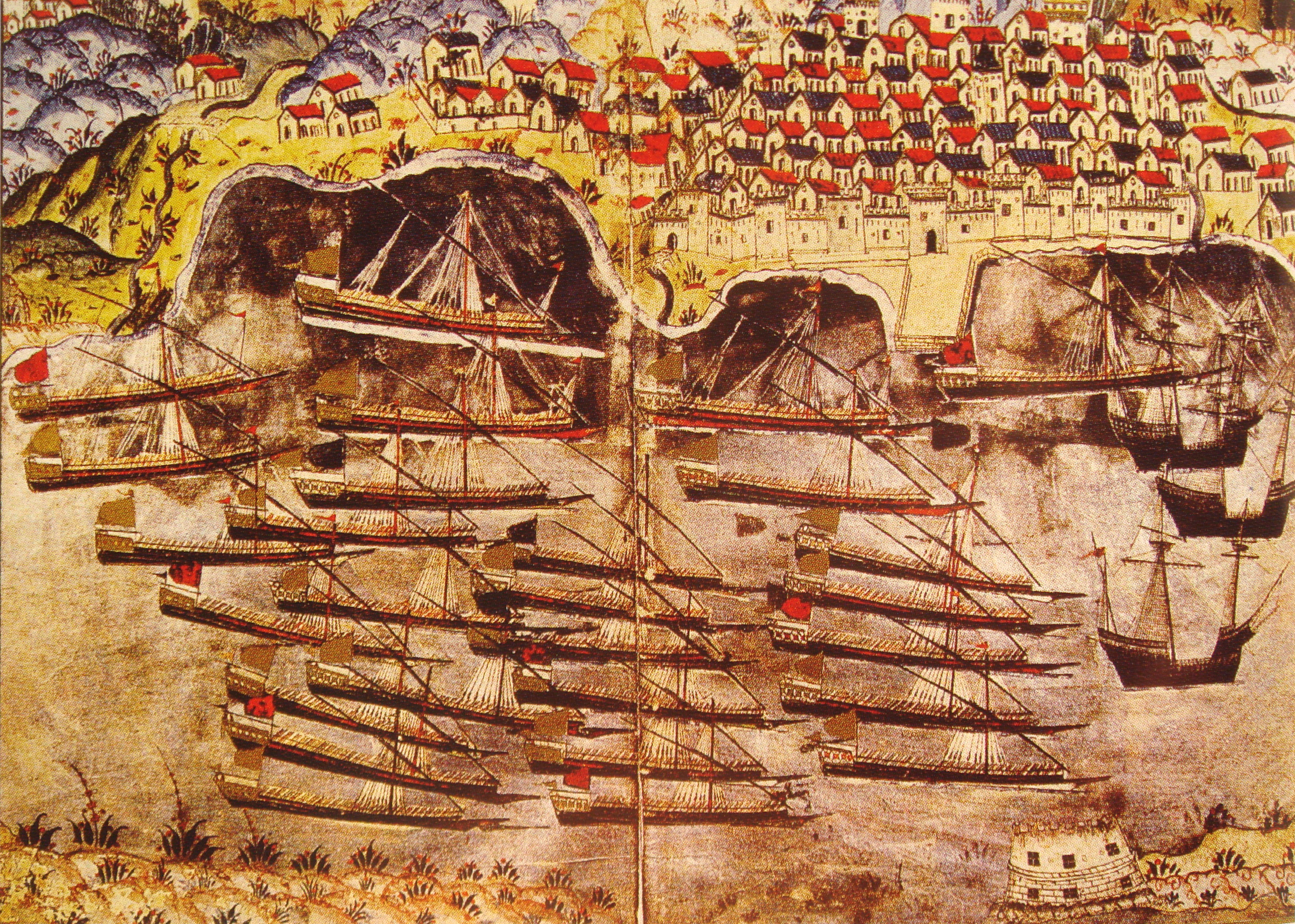
Barbarossa's fleet in Toulon, 1543

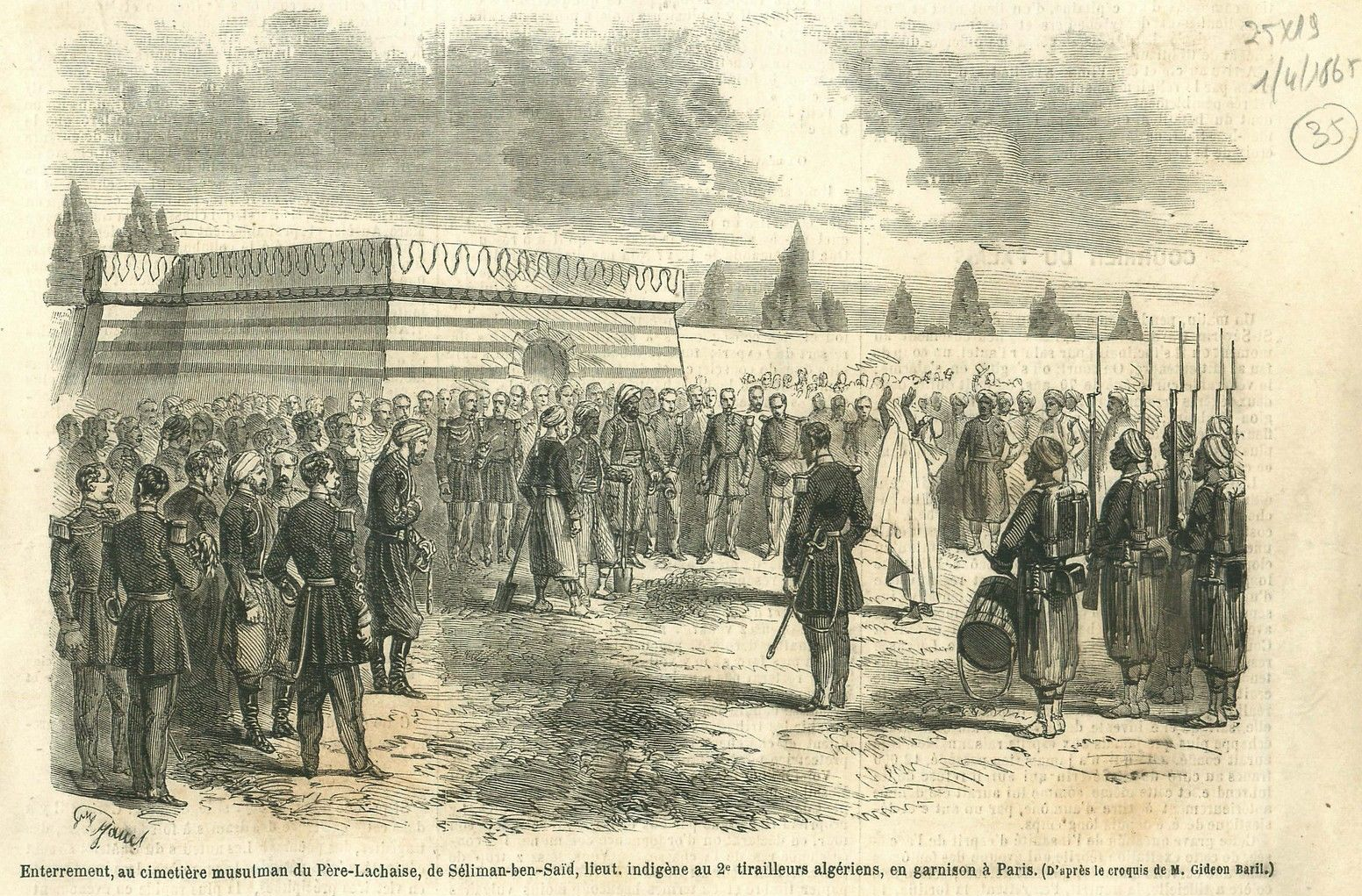
Funeral in Muslim section of Père Lachaise Cemetery, 1865

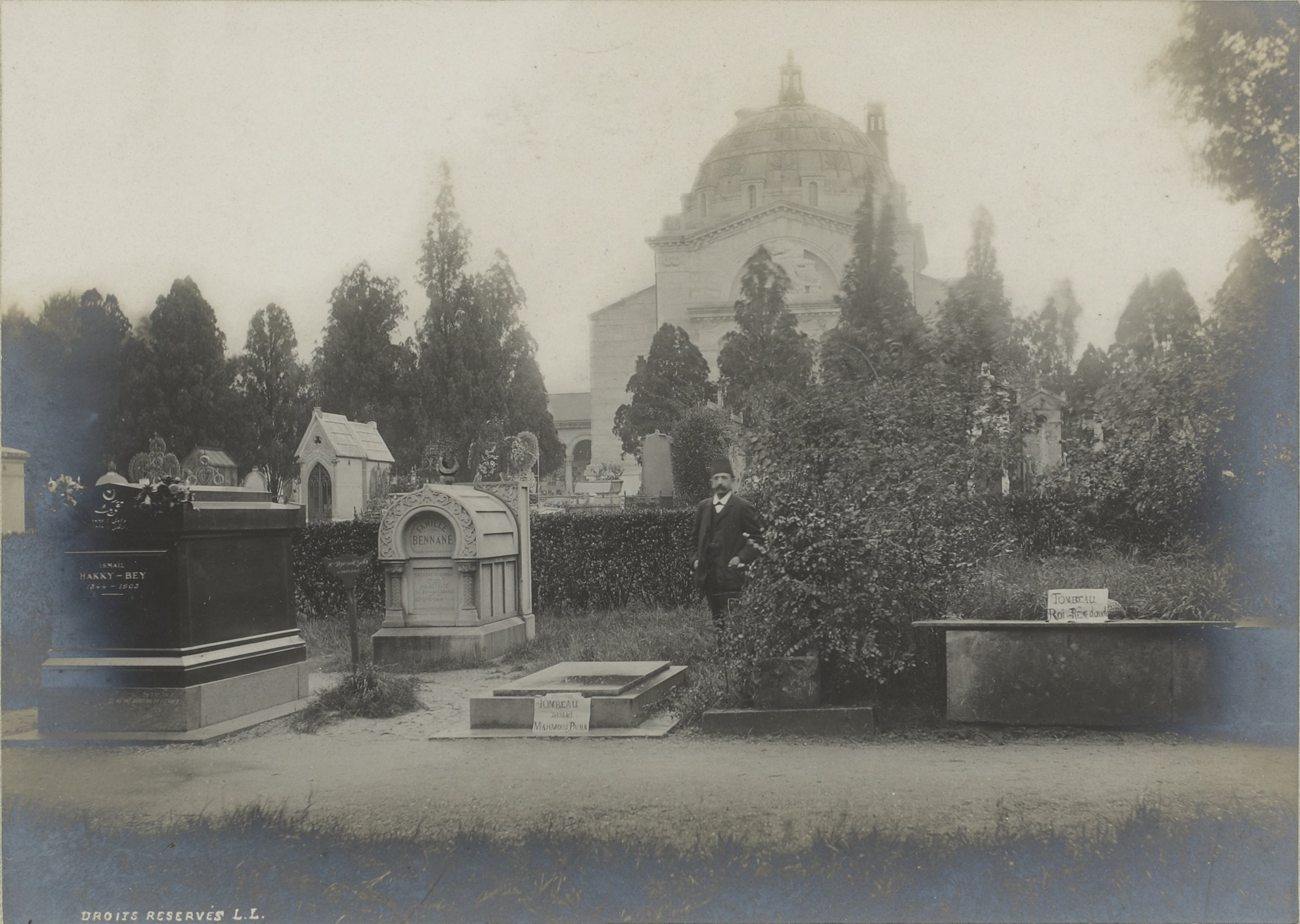
Muslim section of Père Lachaise, between 1903 and 1914

During the conquest of Iberia and the conquest of Gaul, the Umayyad forces would conquer and annex the entirety of the Iberian Peninsula and modern day southern France. Although they would eventually withdraw in 732 AD, Septimania remained under Umayyad dominance until 759. During a later battle, the Al Andalusians established the fortress Fraxinetum.

In 838, the Annales Bertiniani record that Muslims raided Marseille in southern France, plundered its religious houses and took captive both men and women, clerical and lay, as slaves. In 842, the Annales report a raid in the vicinity of Arles. In 869, raiders returned to Arles and captured the archbishop, Roland. They accepted a ransom in return for the archbishop, but when they handed him over he was already dead. The construction of a castle in the Camargue following these raids up the Rhône may have induced raiders to try points further east, culminating in the establishment of a permanent base of operations at Fraxinetum. In 887, Muslim forces from Al-Andalus conquered several bases in France and established the emirate of Fraxinet. They were eventually defeated and expelled in 975.

During the winter of 1543–1544, after the siege of Nice, Toulon was used as an Ottoman naval base under admiral Hayreddin Barbarossa. The Christian population was temporarily evacuated, and Toulon Cathedral was briefly converted into a mosque until the Ottomans' departure.

After the expulsion of the Moriscos from Spain in 1609–1614, about 50,000 Moriscos entered France, according to the research of Henri Lapeyre.

=== 1960–1970s labor immigration ===
Muslim immigration was high in the late 1960s and 1970s. These immigrants mostly hailed from Algeria, Morocco, and Tunisia; however, Islam has had an older history in France, since the Great Mosque of Paris was built in 1922, as a sign of recognition from the French Republic to the fallen Muslim tirailleurs coming from Algeria and Morocco, in particular at the battle of Verdun and the takeover of the Douaumont fort.

=== French Council of the Muslim Faith ===
Though the French State is secular, in recent years the government has tried to organize a representation of French Muslims. In 2002, the then Interior Minister Nicolas Sarkozy initiated the creation of a "French Council of the Muslim Faith" (Conseil Français du Culte Musulman – CFCM), though wide criticism claimed this would only encourage communitarianism. Though the CFCM is informally recognized by the national government, it is a private nonprofit association with no special legal status. As of 2004, it is headed by the rector of the Paris Mosque, Dalil Boubakeur – who harshly criticized the controversial Union of Islamic Organisations of France (UOIF) for involving itself in political matters during the 2005 riots. Sarkozy's views on laïcité have been widely criticized by left- and right-wing members of parliament; more specifically, he was accused, during the creation of the CFCM, of favoring the more extreme sectors of Muslim representation in the Council, in particular the UOIF.

=== Second generation immigrants ===
The first generation of Muslim immigrants, who are today mostly retired from the workforce, kept strong ties with their countries, where their families lived. In 1976, the government passed a law allowing families of these immigrants to settle in France. Thus, the spouses, children, and other family members of these immigrants also came to France. Some of these immigrants, realizing that they could not or did not want to return to their homeland, asked for French nationality before quietly retiring. However, many live alone, having now lost their ties with their families and friends back from their home countries.

Olivier Roy indicates that for first-generation Muslim immigrants from the Mediterranean Maghreb, the fact that they are Muslims is one element among others. Their identification with their country of origin is far stronger than their religious identities: they see themselves first through their descent (Algerians, Moroccans, Tunisians).

The false claim that one-third of newborns in France have Muslim parents, is brought up in sensationalist U.S. American immigration discourse.

=== Maghrebis ===
According to Michèle Tribalat, a researcher at INED, people of Maghrebi origin in France represent 82% of the Muslim population (43.2% from Algeria, 27.5% from Morocco, and 11.4% from Tunisia). Other Muslims are from sub-Saharan Africa (9.3%) and Turkey (8.6%). She estimated that there were 3.5 million people of Maghrebi origin (with at least one grandparent from Algeria, Morocco, or Tunisia) living in France in 2005 – corresponding to 5.8% of the total French metropolitan population (60.7 million in 2005). Maghrebis have settled mainly in the industrial regions in France, especially in the Paris region. Countless famous French people like Edith Piaf, Isabelle Adjani, Arnaud Montebourg, Alain Bashung, Dany Boon, and many others have varying degrees of Maghrebi ancestry.

Below is a table of the population of Maghrebi origin in France, numbers are in thousands:

Country	1999	2005	% 1999/2005	% French population (60.7 million in 2005)
Algeria	1,577	1,865	+18.3%	3.1%
Immigrants	574	679		
Born in France	1,003	1,186		
Morocco	1,005	1,201	+19.5%	2.0%
Immigrants	523	625		
Born in France	482	576		
Tunisia	417	458	+9.8%	0.8%
Immigrants	202	222		
Born in France	215	236		
Total Maghreb	2,999	3,524	+17.5%	5.8%
Immigrants	1 299	1 526		2.5%
Born in France	1 700	1 998		3.3%

In 2005, the percentage of young people under 18 of Maghrebi origin (at least one immigrant parent) was about 7% in Metropolitan France, 12% in Greater Paris and above 20% in French département of Seine-Saint-Denis.

% in 2005	Seine-Saint-Denis	Val-de-Marne	Val-d'Oise	Lyon	Paris	France
Total Maghreb	22.0%	13.2%	13.0%	13.0%	12.1%	6.9%

In 2008, the French national institute of statistics, INSEE, estimated that 11.8 million foreign-born immigrants and their direct descendants (born in France) lived in France representing 19% of the country's population. About 4 million of them are of Maghrebi origin.

According to some non-scientific sources between 5 and 6 million people of Maghrebi origin live in France corresponding to about 7–9% of the total French metropolitan population.

=== Religious practices ===
A report from the French Institute of Statistics in 2024 has reported that 76% of Muslims in France believe that religion is very important while 24% have stated religion played a somewhat important part and role in their life.

The Insee and the National Institute for Demographic Studies in France found that the use of the veil for Muslim women has increased by 55% from 2009 to 2020. There has been an observable increase among all geographic origins, of Muslim women and among second and third generations of Muslim women in France.

The great majority of Muslims practice their religion in the French framework of laïcité, as a religious code of conduct must not infringe the public area. A study in 2008 found that 39% pray (salat) five times a day, 23% attend mosque on Fridays, 70% observe the fast of Ramadan, and 66% abstain from alcohol. Rachel Brown shows that Muslims in France alter some of these religious practices, particularly food practices, as a means of showing "integration" into French culture. According to expert Franck Fregosi: "Although fasting during Ramadan is the most popular practice, it ranks more as a sign of Muslim identity than piety, and it is more a sign of belonging to a culture and a community", and he added that not drinking alcohol "seems to be more a cultural behavior."

Some Muslims (the UOIF for example) request the recognition of an Islamic community in France (which remains to be built) with an official status.

Two main organizations are recognized by the French Council of Muslim Faith (CFCM): the "Federation of the French Muslims" (Fédération des musulmans de France) with a majority of Moroccan leaders, and the controversial "Union of Islamic Organisations of France" (Union des organizations islamiques de France) (UOIF). In 2008, there were about 2,125 Muslim places of worship in France.

=== Education ===
Since publicly funded state schools in France must be secular, owing to the 1905 separation of Church and State, Muslim parents who wish their children to be educated at a religious school often choose private (and therefore fee-paying, though heavily subsidized) Catholic schools, of which there are many. Few specifically Muslim schools have been created. There is a Muslim school in La Réunion (a French island to the east of Madagascar), and the first Muslim collège (a school for students aged eleven to fifteen) opened its doors in 2001 in Aubervilliers (a suburb northeast of Paris), with eleven students. Unlike most private schools in the United States and the UK, these religious schools are affordable for most parents since they may be heavily subsidized by the government (teachers' wages in particular are covered by the state).

=== Radicalization ===
In November 2015 in the aftermath of the Paris attacks, French authorities for the first time closed three mosques with extremist activities and radicalization being given as the reason. The mosques were located in Lagny-sur-Marne, Lyon, and Gennevilliers. Muslim community leaders widely condemned the Paris attacks in public statements and expressed their support for the French government's attempts to oppose Islamist extremism.

Due to the deadly attacks in 2015, France changed the character of Islamist radicalization from a security threat to constitute a societal problem. President François Hollande and prime minister Manuel Valls saw the fundamental values of the French republic being challenged and called them attacks against fundamental secular, enlightenment, and democratic values along with "what makes us who we are".

In 2016, French authorities reported that 120 of the 2,500 Islamic prayer halls were disseminating Salafist ideas and 20 mosques were closed due to findings of hate speech. In 2016, French authorities stated that 15000 of the 20000 individuals on the list of security threats belong to Islamist movements.

In 2018, EU anti-terror coordinator Gilles de Kerchove estimated there to be 17,000 radicalized Muslims and jihadists living in France.

In 2018, French intelligence services monitored around 11,000 individuals with suspected ties to radical Islamism. France has sentenced a large number of individuals for terrorist-related offenses which have increased the prison population. This in turn has created an issue with radicalization in French prisons.

In February 2019, authorities in Grenoble closed the Al-Kawthar Mosque for six months due to it propagating a "radical Islamist ideology". The Al-Kawthar Mosque had about 400 regular visitors. In several of the sermons, the imam legitimized armed jihad, violence, and hatred towards followers of other religions' anti-republican values and promoted Sharia law.

In November 2019, French authorities closed cafés, schools, and mosques in about 15 neighborhoods due to them disseminating political Islam and communitarian ideas.

In October 2020, President Emmanuel Macron announced a crackdown on "Islamist separatism" in Muslim communities in France, saying a bill with this objective would be sent to parliament in "early 2021." Among the measures, would be a ban on foreign imams, restrictions on homeschooling, and the creation of an "Institute of Islamology" to tackle Islamic fundamentalism. His government introduced a bill that would punish with jail terms and fine any doctor who provides virginity certificates for traditional, religious marriages. ANCIC stated it supported the government's stand against "virginity tests" but warned that in some cases women were in "real danger" and "a ban would simply deny the existence of such community practices, without making them disappear". The association suggested that the issue be "tackled quite differently so that women and men free themselves and reject the weight of [such] traditions." On 16 February 2021, the law passed the lower house 347—151 with 65 abstentions.

=== Terrorist attacks in France ===
France had its first occurrences with religious extremism in the 1980s due to French involvement in the Lebanese Civil War. In the 1990s, a series of attacks on French soil were executed by the Armed Islamic Group of Algeria (GIA).

In the 1990–2010 time span, France experienced repeated attacks linked to international jihadist movements. Le Monde reported on 26 July 2016 that "Islamist Terrorism" had caused 236 dead in France in the preceding 18-month period.

In the 2015–2018 timespan in France, 249 people were killed and 928 wounded in a total of 22 terrorist attacks.

The deadly attacks in 2015 in France changed the issue of Islamist radicalization from a security threat to also constitute a social problem. Prime minister François Hollande and prime minister Manuel Valls saw the fundamental values of the French republic being challenged and called them attacks against secular, enlightenment and democratic values along with "what makes us who we are".

Although jihadists since 2015 have legitimized their attacks with a narrative of reprisal for France's participation in the international coalition fighting the Islamic State, Islamic terrorism in France has other, deeper and older causes. The main reasons France suffers frequent attacks are, in no particular order:

- France's secular domestic policies (Laïcité) which jihadists perceive to be hostile towards Islam. Also, France's status as an officially secular nation and jihadists label France as "the flagship of disbelief".
- France has a strong cultural tradition in comics, which in the context of Muhammad cartoons is a question of freedom of expression.
- France has a large Muslim minority
- France's foreign policy towards Muslim countries and jihadist fronts. France is seen as the spearhead directed against jihadist groups in Africa, just as the United States is seen as the main force opposing jihadist groups elsewhere. France's former foreign policies such as that as its colonization of Muslim countries is also brought up in jihadist propaganda, for example, that the influence of French education, culture and political institutions had served to erase the Muslim identity of those colonies and their inhabitants.
- Jihadists consider France as a strong proponent of disbelief. For instance, Marianne, the national emblem of France, is considered as "a false idol" by jihadists and the French to be "idol worshippers". France also has no law against blasphemy and an anticlerical satirical press which is less respectful towards religion than that of the US or the United Kingdom. The French nation state is also perceived as an obstacle towards establishing a caliphate.

In 2020 two Islamic terrorist attacks were foiled by authorities, bringing the total to 33 since 2017 according to Laurent Nuñez, the director of CNRLT, who declared that Sunni Islamist terrorism was a prioritized threat. Nuñez drew parallels between the three attacks of 2020 which all were attacks on "blasphemy and the will to avenge their prophet".

=== Law against Islamist extremism ===
After the murder of Paty, a bill was put forward to fight Islamist extremism and separatism to fight the roots of jihadist violence. It was approved by the National Assembly in February 2021.

A new bill was introduced, which makes it unlawful to threaten a public servant in order to gain an exception or special treatment which carries a penalty of up to five years in prison. The legislation expands the powers of authorities to close places of worship and religious organisations when they promote "hate or violence". The law requires religious funds from abroad exceeding €10,000 to be declared and the relevant accounts to be certified, so as to regulate the donations from countries such as Turkey, Qatar and Saudi Arabia. Millions of euros in funding had previously reached France from countries such as Turkey, Morocco and Saudi Arabia.

It provides stricter rules for allowing home-schooling in order to prevent parents taking children out of school in order to let them pursue their education in underground Islamist institutions. Doctors performing virginity tests would be subject to fines or prison sentences. These changes were prompted by a number of cases of Muslim men trying to have their marriages annulled by accusing their spouse of having had sex before marriage. Authorities will have to refuse residency documents to applicants who practise polygamy. Forced marriage, which The French ministry of the interior states affects 200,000 women in France, was likewise required to be combated with greater scrutiny from registrars.

=== Investigation on the Influence of Political Islam ===
In May 2024, the French government initiated an investigation aimed at assessing the influence of political Islam and the Muslim Brotherhood in France. The government delegated this task to two senior officials, diplomat François Gouyette and prefect Pascal Courtade. Their work is anticipated to yield a comprehensive report by the fall of 2024. According to a statement from the Ministry of Interior, this effort is in direct alignment with the context of the Les Mureaux (Yvelines) speech on separatism delivered by Emmanuel Macron in 2020, which later led to the 2021 law on the principles and values of the Republic.

== Integration ==
=== Accepted French citizens ===
Notwithstanding the islamist extremists' terrorist attacks in France, including the Charlie Hebdo and Nice terror attacks, some studies have concluded that France is the European country where Muslims integrate the best and feel the most for their country, and that French Muslims have the most positive opinions about their fellow citizens of different faiths. A 2006 study from the Pew Research Center on Integration is one such study. In Paris and the surrounding Île-de-France region where French Muslims tend to be more educated and religious, the vast majority rejects violence and say they are loyal to France according to studies by Euro-Islam, a comparative research network on Islam and Muslims in the West sponsored by GSRL Paris/CNRS France and Harvard University. On the other hand, a 2013 IPSOS survey published by the French daily Le Monde, indicated that only 26% of French respondents believed that Islam was compatible with French society (compared to 89% identifying Catholicism as compatible and 75% identifying Judaism as compatible). A 2014 survey by the Pew Research Center showed that out of all Europeans, the French view Muslim minorities most favorably with 72% having a favorable opinion. Other research has shown how these positive attitudes are not always reflected in popular opinion and the subject of Muslim integration in France is much more nuanced and complex.

In April 2018, an Algerian Muslim woman refused to shake hands with an official for religious reasons at a citizenship ceremony. As an applicant must demonstrate being integrated into society as well as respect for French values, officials considered her not integrated and denied her citizenship application.

=== Religiosity ===
According to a poll by Institut français d'opinion publique in 2020, 46% of a sample of 10,000 Muslims gave the view that their religious beliefs were as important than the "French values" and laws. Among Muslims under 25 years old, a large majority (74%) considered their religion more important than "French values."

=== LGBT acceptance ===
A 17-year-old Gallup poll, published in 2009, showed that 35% of French Muslims believed that homosexuality is morally acceptable.

=== Unemployment ===
In October 2020, the unemployment among Muslims was far higher at 14% than the population at large (8%); religious discrimination and ethnic-origin discrimination against French Muslims is common in French employment practices and processes, French people with Arabic-language surnames (whether they are Muslim, Christian, or Jewish) experience hurdles in French workplaces.

=== Education ===
According to a poll by Institut Montaigne in 2016, 25% of Muslims in France had less than secondary education (Baccalauréat). 12% had two years of higher education, a further 20% had more than two years. It has been estimated that Muslim students form more than 10% of the students in the French Catholic schools.

=== Discrimination ===
In 2010, a study entitled Are French Muslims Discriminated Against in Their Own Country? found that "Muslims sending out resumes in hopes of a job interview had 2.5 times less chance than Christians" with similar credentials "of a positive response to their applications".

Another example is the 2004 French ban on ostentatious religious signs in public schools for minors, which forced young girls insisting on wearing the hijab in school out of public schools.

Other examples of discrimination against Muslims include the desecration of 148 French Muslim graves near Arras. A pig's head was hung from a headstone and profanities insulting Islam and Muslims were daubed on some graves. Destruction and vandalism of Muslim graves in France were seen as Islamophobic by a report of the European Monitoring Centre on Racism and Xenophobia. Several of Mosques have also been vandalized in France over the years. On 14 January 2015, it was reported that 26 mosques in France had been subject to attack since the Charlie Hebdo shooting in Paris.

On 29 June 2017, a man who had schizophrenia attempted to ram his vehicle into a crowd of worshipers exiting a mosque in Créteil, a suburb of Paris, though no one was injured. Le Parisien claims the suspect, of Armenian origin, wanted to "avenge the Bataclan and Champs-Elysées" attacks.

In 2019, the French Institute for Public Research (IFOP) conducted a study from August 29 to September 18, based on a sample of 1007 Muslims aged 15 and above. According to the study, 40% of Muslims in France felt that they were discriminated against. More than a third of these instances were recorded in the past five years, suggesting an increase in the overall mistreatment of Muslims in France over recent years. The survey found that 60% of women wearing a headscarf were subject to discrimination. 37% of Muslims in France have been a victim of verbal harassment or defamatory insults. The study, however, revealed that 44% of Muslim women who do not wear headscarves found themselves being a victim of verbal harassment or defamatory insults. The survey found that 13% of incidents of religious discrimination happened at police control points and 17% happened at job interviews. 14% of incidents occurred while the victims were looking to rent or buy accommodation. The IFOP stated that 24% of Muslims were exposed to verbal aggression during their lifetime, compared to 9% among non-Muslims. In addition, 7% of Muslims were physically attacked, compared to 3% of non-Muslims.

In 2019, according to the French Ministry of Interior, 154 anti-religious acts targeted Muslims, while those targeting Jews stood at 687, and those against Christians was 1,052. Most of these acts consisted of vandalism of "property of a religious nature."

=== Public opinion ===
A February 2017 poll of 10 000 people in 10 European countries by Chatham House found on average a majority (55%) were opposed to further Muslim immigration, with opposition especially pronounced in Austria, Poland, Hungary, France and Belgium. Except for Poland, all of those had recently suffered jihadist terror attacks or been at the center of a refugee crisis. A survey published in 2019 by the Pew Research Center found that 72% of French respondents had a favorable view of Muslims in their country, whereas 22% had an unfavourable view.

=== Repercussions ===
The 2005 French riots have been controversially interpreted as an illustration of the difficulty of integrating Muslims in France, and smaller-scale riots have been occurring throughout the 1980s and 1990s, first in Vaulx-en-Velin in 1979, and in Vénissieux in 1981, 1983, 1990 and 1999.

Furthermore, although Interior Minister Nicolas Sarkozy claimed that most rioters were immigrants and already known to the police, the majority were, in fact, previously unknown to the police.

In 2014, an analysis by The Washington Post showed that between 60 and 70% of the prison population in France are Muslim or come from Muslim backgrounds while Muslims constitute 12% of the population of France. The claims in this article have been refuted: the headline figure was based on research in 4 Paris and north regions prisons out of a total 188 by Professor Farhad Khosrovkhavar later said his best estimate was 40–50%, but that data is not recorded by French authorities. Statistics on ethnicity and religion are banned in France. In 2013, 18,300 (27%) of the 67,700 French prison population registered for Ramadan, an indication of their religious affiliation.

=== Hijab ===
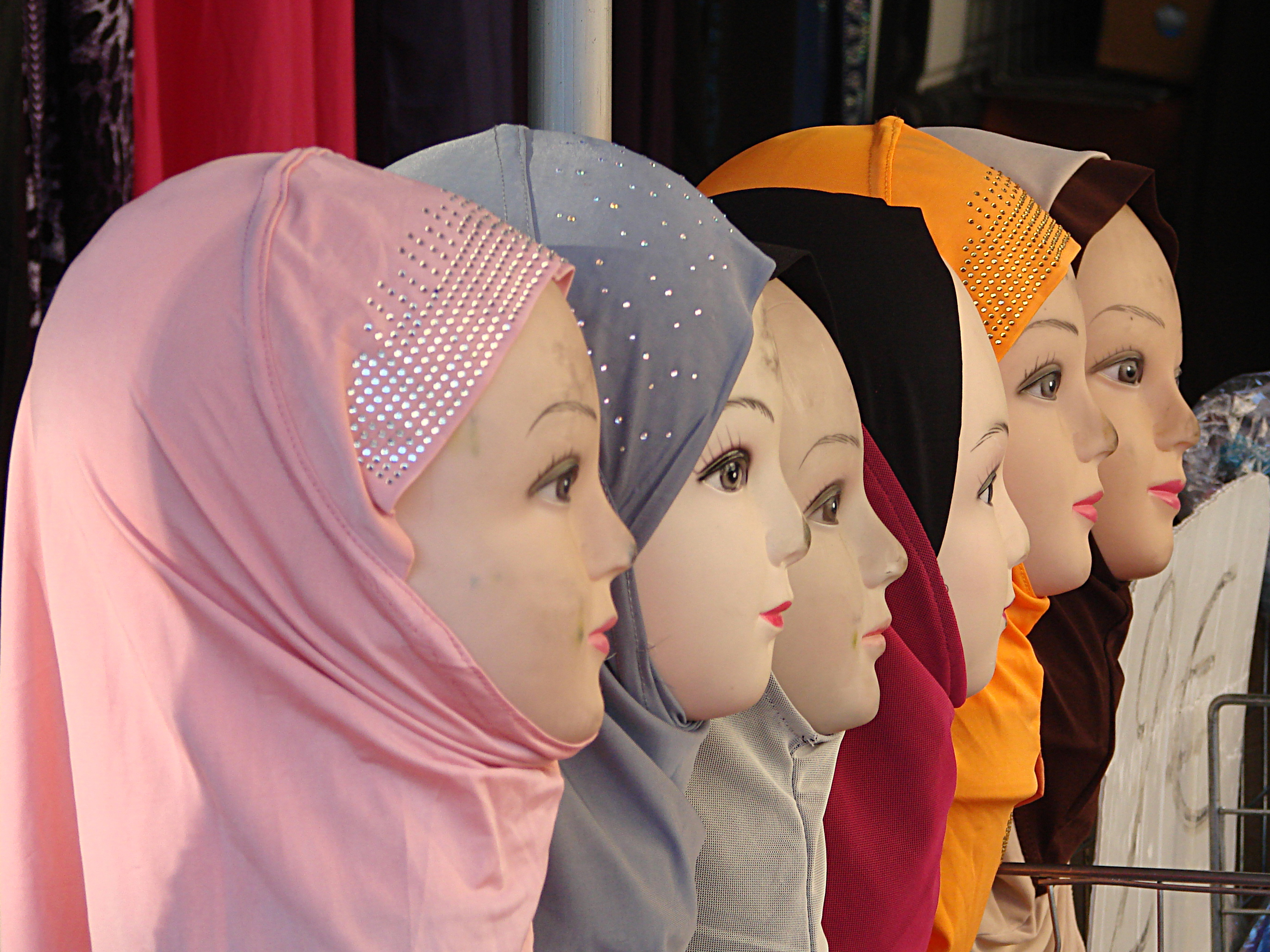
Mannequins in the city of Béziers advertising the hijab

The wearing of hijab in France has been a very controversial issue since 1989. The debate essentially concerns whether Muslim girls who choose to wear hijab may do so in state schools. A secondary issue is how to protect the free choice and other rights of young Muslim women who do not want the veil, but who may face strong pressure from families or some traditionalists. Similar issues exist for civil servants and the acceptance of male Muslim medics in medical services.

In 1994, the French Ministry for Education sent out recommendations to teachers and headmasters to ban the veil in educational institutions. According to a 2019 study by the Institute of Labor Economics, more girls with a Muslim background born after 1980 graduated from high school after the 1994 restrictions were introduced. While secularism is often criticized for restricting freedom of religion, the study suggested that "public schools ended up promoting the educational empowerment of some of the most disadvantaged groups of female students".

Leila Babes in her book The Veil Demystified, believe that wearing the veil does not derive from a Muslim religious imperative.

The French government and a large majority of public opinion are opposed to the wearing of a "conspicuous" sign of religious expression (dress or symbol), whatever the religion, as this is incompatible with the French system of laïcité. In December 2003, President Jacques Chirac said that it breaches the separation of church and state and would increase tensions in France's multicultural society, whose Muslim and Jewish populations are both the biggest of their kind in Western Europe.

The issue of Muslim hijabs has sparked controversy after several girls refused to uncover their heads in class, as early as 1989. In October 1989, three Muslim schoolgirls wearing the Islamic headscarf were expelled from the collège Gabriel-Havez in Creil (north of Paris). In November, the First Conseil d'État ruling affirmed that the wearing of the Islamic headscarf, as a symbol of freedom of religious expression, in public schools was not incompatible with the French school system and the system of laïcité. In December, a first ministerial circular (circulaire Jospin) was published, stating teachers had to decide on a case-by-case basis whether to ban the wearing of Islamic headscarves.

In January 1990, three schoolgirls were expelled from the collège Pasteur in Noyon, north of Paris. The parents of one expelled schoolgirl filed a defamation action against the principal of the collège Gabriel-Havez in Creil. As a result, the teachers of a collège in Nantua (eastern part of France, just to the west of Geneva, Switzerland) went on strike to protest the wearing of the Islamic headscarf in school. A second ministerial circular was published in October, to restate the need to respect the principle of laïcité in public schools.

In September 1994, a third ministerial circular (circulaire Bayrou) was published, making a distinction between "discreet" symbols to be tolerated in public schools, and "ostentatious" symbols, including the Islamic headscarf, to be banned from public schools. In October, some students demonstrated at the lycée Saint Exupéry in Mantes-la-Jolie (northwest of Paris) to support the freedom to wear Islamic headscarves in school. In November, approximately twenty-four veiled schoolgirls were expelled from the lycée Saint Exupéry in Mantes-la-Jolie and the lycée Faidherbe in Lille.

In December 2003, President Chirac decided that the law should prohibit the wearing of visible religious signs in schools, according to laïcité requirements. The law was approved by parliament in March 2004. Items prohibited by this law include hijabs, Jewish yarmulkes, or large Christian crosses. It is still permissible to wear discreet symbols of faith such as small crosses, Stars of David, or Fatima's hands.

Two French journalists working in Iraq, Christian Chesnot and Georges Malbrunot were taken hostage by the "Islamic Army in Iraq" (an Iraqi resistance militant movement) under accusations of spying. Threats to kill the two journalists if the law on headscarves was not revoked were published on the Internet by groups claiming to be the "Islamic Army in Iraq". The two journalists were later released unharmed.

The arguments resurfaced when, on 22 June 2009, at the Congrès de Versailles, President Nicolas Sarkozy declared that the Islamic burqa is not welcome in France, claiming that the full-length, body-covering gown was a symbol of subservience that suppresses women's identities and turns them into "prisoners behind a screen." A parliamentary commission of thirty-two deputies led by André Gerin (PCF), was also formed to study the possibility of banning the public wearing of the burqa or niqab. There is suspicion, however, that Sarkozy is "playing politics in a time of economic unhappiness and social anxiety."

A Muslim group spokesman expressed serious concern over the proposed legislation, noting that "even if they ban the burqa, it will not stop there," adding that "there is a permanent demand for legislating against Muslims. This could go really bad, and I'm scared of it. I feel like they're turning the screws on us."

On 25 January 2010 it was announced that the parliamentary committee, having concluded its study, would recommend that a ban on veils covering the face in public locations such as hospitals and schools be enacted, but not in private buildings or on the street.

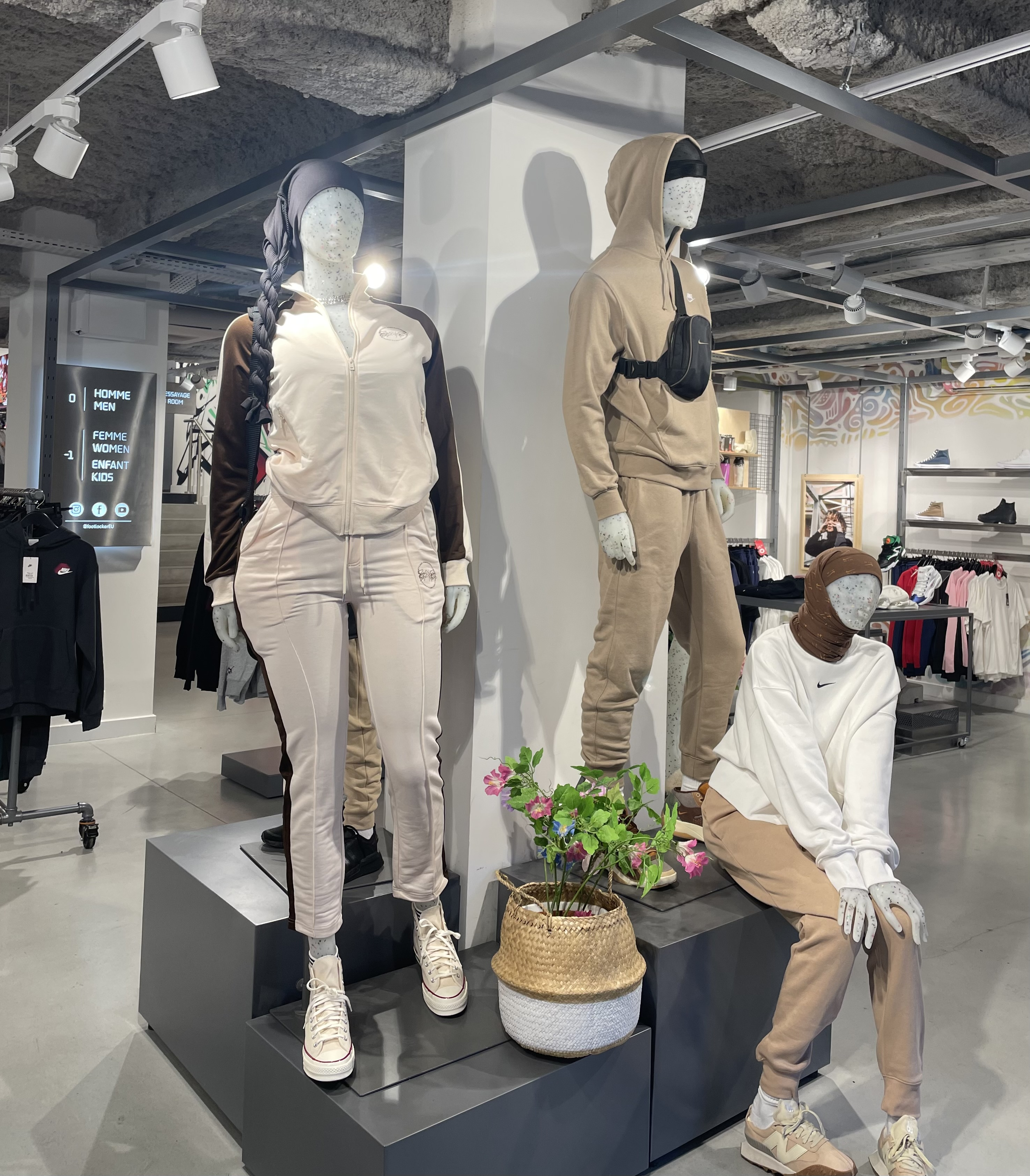
Foot Locker store in Saint Denis with mannequins advertising sports hijab in 2022.

In February 2019, Decathlon, Europe's largest sports retailer, announced plans to begin selling a sports hijab in their stores in France. Decathlon had begun selling the product in Morocco the previous week, but the plan was criticized on social media, with several politicians expressing discomfort with the product being sold. Decathlon originally stood firm, arguing it was focused on "democratizing" sports. The company released a statement saying its goal was to "offer them a suitable sports product, without judging." While Nike had already sold hijabs in France, Decathlon was met with much more scrutiny. Multiple salespeople were threatened physically in stores. The company also received hundreds of calls and emails in regard to the product. Decathlon was forced to backtrack and has since halted its plans to sell the sports hijab. Many throughout France were left disappointed with one Muslim entrepreneur, who didn't consider selling sport hijabs, stating, "it's a shame that Decathlon didn't stand firm."

=== Politics ===
Formal as well as informal Muslim organizations help the new French citizens to integrate. Several political parties like Parti égalité et Justice have now appeared. Their most frequent activities are homework help and language classes in Arabic, ping pong, Muslim discussion groups etc. are also common. However, most important associations active in assisting with the immigration process are either secular (GISTI, for example) or ecumenist (such as the protestant-founded Cimade).

The most important national institution is the CFCM (Conseil Français du Culte Musulman) this institution was designed on the model of the "Consistoire Juif de France" and of the "Fédération protestante de France" both Napoleonic creations. The aim of the CFCM (like its Jewish and protestant counterparts) is to discuss religious problem with the state, participate in certain public institutions, and organize the religious life of French Muslims. The CFCM is elected by the French Muslims through local election. It is the only official instance of the French Muslims.

There were four organizations represented in the CFCM elected in 2003, GMP (Grande mosquée de Paris), UOIF (Union des organizations islamiques de France), FNMF (Fédération nationale des musulmans de France) CCMTF (Comité de coordination des musulmans Turcs de France). In 2008, a new council was elected. The winner was RMF (Rassemblement des musulmans de France) with a majority of the votes, followed by the UOIF and the CCMTF. Other elections took place since then, the latest was due in 2019 but is still pending.

Other organizations exist, such as PCM (Muslim Participation and Spirituality), which combine political mobilization (against racism, sexism etc.) and spiritual meetings, and put emphasis on the need to get involved in French society – by joining organizations, registering to vote, working with your children's schools etc. They do not have clear-cut political positions as such but push for active citizenship. They are vaguely on the left in practice.

The government has yet to formulate an official policy towards making integration easier. As mentioned above, it is difficult to determine in France who may be called a Muslim. Some Muslims in France describe themselves as "non-practicing". Most simply observe Ramadan and other basic rules but are otherwise secular.

== Statistics ==
Due to a law dating from 1872, the French Republic prohibits performing census by making distinction between its citizens regarding their race or their beliefs. However, that law does not concern surveys and polls, which are free to ask those questions if they wish. The law also allows for an exception for public institutions such as INED or INSEE whose job it is to collect data on demographics, social trends and other related subjects, on condition that the collection of such data has been authorized by the CNIL and the National Council of Statistical Information (CNIS).

=== Estimations based on declaration ===
Surveys from INED and the INSEE in October 2010 concluded that France has 2.1 million "declared Muslims".

Based on 2023 research in 2019–2020, Muslims made up 10% of the French adult population, according to INSEE.

=== Estimations based on people's geographic origin ===
In 1960, there was approximately 400,000 Muslims in France, corresponding to 0.9% of the population at the time. In 1975, the estimated number of Muslims was more than one million.

According to the French Government, which does not have the right to ask direct questions about religion and uses a criterion of people's geographic origin as a basis for calculation, there were between 3 and 3.2 million Muslims in metropolitan France in 2010. Thirteen years later, the proportion of Muslims in France rose to 10%, according to INSEE.

The government counted all those people in France who migrated from countries with a dominant Muslim population, or whose parents did.

The United States Department of State placed it at roughly 10%, while two 2007 polls estimated it at about 3% of the total population. The CIA World Factbook places it at 7–9%.

A Pew Forum study, published in January 2011, estimated 4.7 million Muslims in France in 2010 (and forecasted 6.9 million in 2030).

The French polling company IFOP estimated in 2016 that French Muslims number between 3 and 4 million and criticized suggestions of a significant demographic religious slide (the so-called Great Replacement conspiracy theory, French: grand remplacement). IFOP claims that they make up 5.6% of those older than 15, and 10% of those younger than 25. According to an IFOP survey for the newspaper La Croix in 2011, based on a combination of previous surveys, 75% of people from families "of Muslim origin" [sic] said they were believers. This is more than the previous study in 2007 (71%) but less than the one before 2001 (78%). This variation, caused by the declarative aspect of the survey, illustrates the difficulty of establishing precisely the number of believers. According to the same survey 155 of those surveyed who had at-least one Muslim parent 84.8% identified as Muslims, 3.4% identified as Christians, 10.0% identified as not religious and 1.3% belonged to other religions.

A 1999 Interior ministry source in Alain Boyer's l'Islam dans la République published the following estimated distribution of Muslims by affiliated countries:

Algeria	1,550,000
Morocco	1,000,000
Tunisia	350,000
Turkey	315,000
Sub-Saharan Africa	250,000
West Asia	100,000
remaining Asia (mostly Pakistan and Bangladesh)	100,000
Converts	40,000
Undocumented immigrants or awaiting regularization	350,000
Other	100,000
Total	4,155,000

In 2008, thirty-nine percent of Muslims surveyed by the polling group IFOP said they observed Islam's five prayers daily, a steady rise from 31 percent in 1994, according to the study published in the Catholic daily La Croix.

Mosque attendance for Friday prayers has risen to 23 percent, in 2008 up from 16 percent in 1994, while in 2008 Ramadan observance has reached 70 percent compared to 60 percent in 1994, it said. Drinking alcohol, which Islam forbids, has also declined to 34 percent from 39 percent in 1994, according to the survey of 537 people of Muslim origin.

A 2015 study found that up to 12,000 French Muslims converted to Christianity, but cited that this number may be underestimated, and it may include only Protestant converts.

According to Michèle Tribalat, a researcher at INED, an acceptance of 5 to 6 million Muslims in France in 1999 was overestimated. Her work has shown that there were 3.7 million people of "possible Muslim faith" in France in 1999 (6.3% of the total population of Metropolitan France). In 2009, she estimated that the number of people of the Muslim faith in France was about 4.5 million.

According to Jean-Paul Gourévitch, there were 8.5 million of Muslim origin (about 1/8 of the population), in metropolitan France in 2017.

In 2017, François Héran, former Head of the Population Surveys Branch at INSEE and Director of INED (French National Institute for Demographic Research) between 1999 and 2009, stated that about one eighth of the French population was of Muslim origin in 2017 (8.4 million).

According to the latest Special Eurobarometer 493 (2019) the Muslim population in France is estimated to be 5% or 3.35 million.

Pew Research Center predicts the Muslim population would rise to 8.6 million or 12.7 percent of the country in 2050 with zero immigration, and 13.2 million or 18.0 percent with high immigration.

According to a 2023 report by the INED-INSEE 91% of those who were raised in Muslim families in France follow the same religion and faith of their parents.

=== Converts ===
In 2013, The New York Times quoted Bernard Godard, a former French intelligence official specializing in Islamic affairs and back then associated with the country's Interior Ministry, who estimated France's total Muslim population to be 6 million out of which 100,000 were converts (up from 50,000 in 1986) while Muslim associations talk of 200,000.

In 2025, a Le Parisien report states that specialists such as sociologist Franck Frégosi, author of Gouverner l'islam en France (To Govern Islam in France), estimate that around 5,000 people convert to Islam in France each year, a figure derived from sociological observation rather than centralized records, and note that the trend appears to be rising compared with previous decades.

=== Muslim–Jewish relations ===
A survey by the Pew Research Center in 2006 in Germany, France, Great Britain, and Spain showed that 71% of French Muslims had a positive view of their fellow Jewish citizens, the highest percentage of positive sentiment, the only majority expressed positively among all European Muslims. A majority of Muslims in France also did not support Hamas (46% negative vs. 44% positive answers to the question: "Is Hamas' victory good for Palestinians?") and 71% of respondents did not approve of Iran acquiring nuclear weapons. This Muslim-Jewish solidarity in France can be partially explained by the fact that a high percentage of both populations share origins in the Maghreb and the effects of French laïcité on vivre-ensemble (i.e "living-together") in shared civil institutional spaces which remain religiously and politically neutral for all.

== French Muslims ==
=== Athletes ===
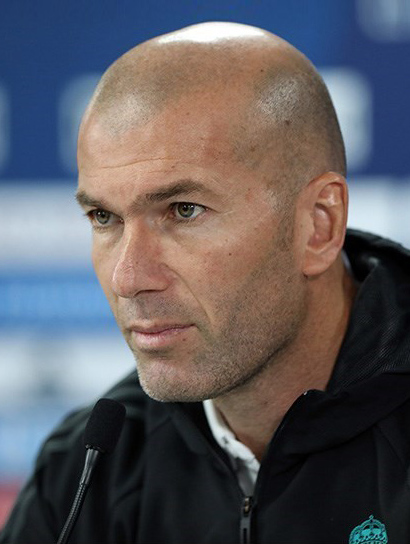
Zinedine Zidane, prominent football player

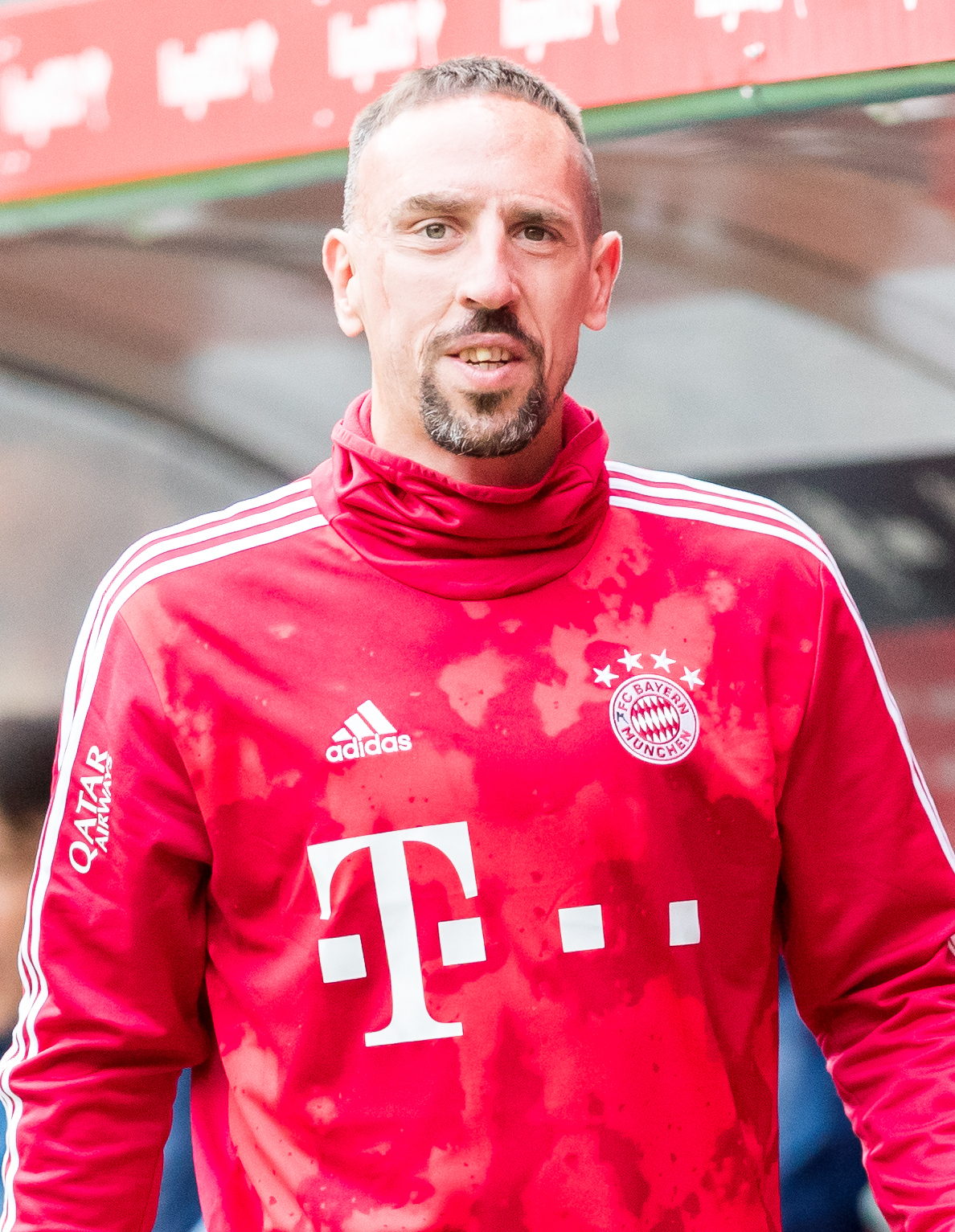
Football player Franck Ribery

- Zinedine Zidane, football player
- Karim Benzema, football player
- Nicolas Anelka, football player
- Hatem Ben Arfa, football player
- Wissam Ben Yedder, football player
- N'Golo Kante, football player
- Houssem Aouar, football player
- Nabil Fekir, football player
- Mohamed Haouas, international rugby player
- Samir Nasri, football player
- Paul Pogba, football player
- Adil Rami, football player
- Swan Rebbadj, international rugby union player
- Franck Ribéry, football player
- Mamadou Sakho, football player
- Moussa Sissoko, football player
- Rabah Slimani, rugby player (both loose head and tight head prop) for Stade Français and in the French national rugby union team, highest-paid French player
- Ousmane Dembele, football player
- Benjamin Mendy, football player
- Bacary Sagna, football player
- Djibril Sidibe, football player
- Cédric Doumbé MMA fighter, convert
- Isack Hadjar, Formula 1 Driver

=== Arts ===
- Nasreddine Dinet, painter

==== Actors ====
- Brahim Achabbakhe, actor and stunt-performer
- Leïla Bekhti, award-winning film and television actress, L'Oréal ambassador
- Assaad Bouab, French-Moroccan actor of Call My Agent! fame
- Sami Bouajila, award-winning actor, recipient of two César Awards
- Rachida Brakni, award-winning actress, Comédie française member, wife of Eric Cantona
- Jamel Debbouze, award-winning actor and stand-up comedian, producer, philanthropist, husband of TV journalist and producer Mélissa Theuriau
- Kheiron, Iranian-born French comedian, actor and film director
- Sabrina Ouazani, actress of The Hook Up Plan and Games of Love and Chance fame
- Tahar Rahim, multiple César Award-winning actor, Oscars, BAFTA and Golden Globe nominee
- Omar Sy, award-winning actor, first ever Black winner of the César Award for Best Actor in 2012
- Roschdy Zem, award-winning actor and director

==== Singers ====
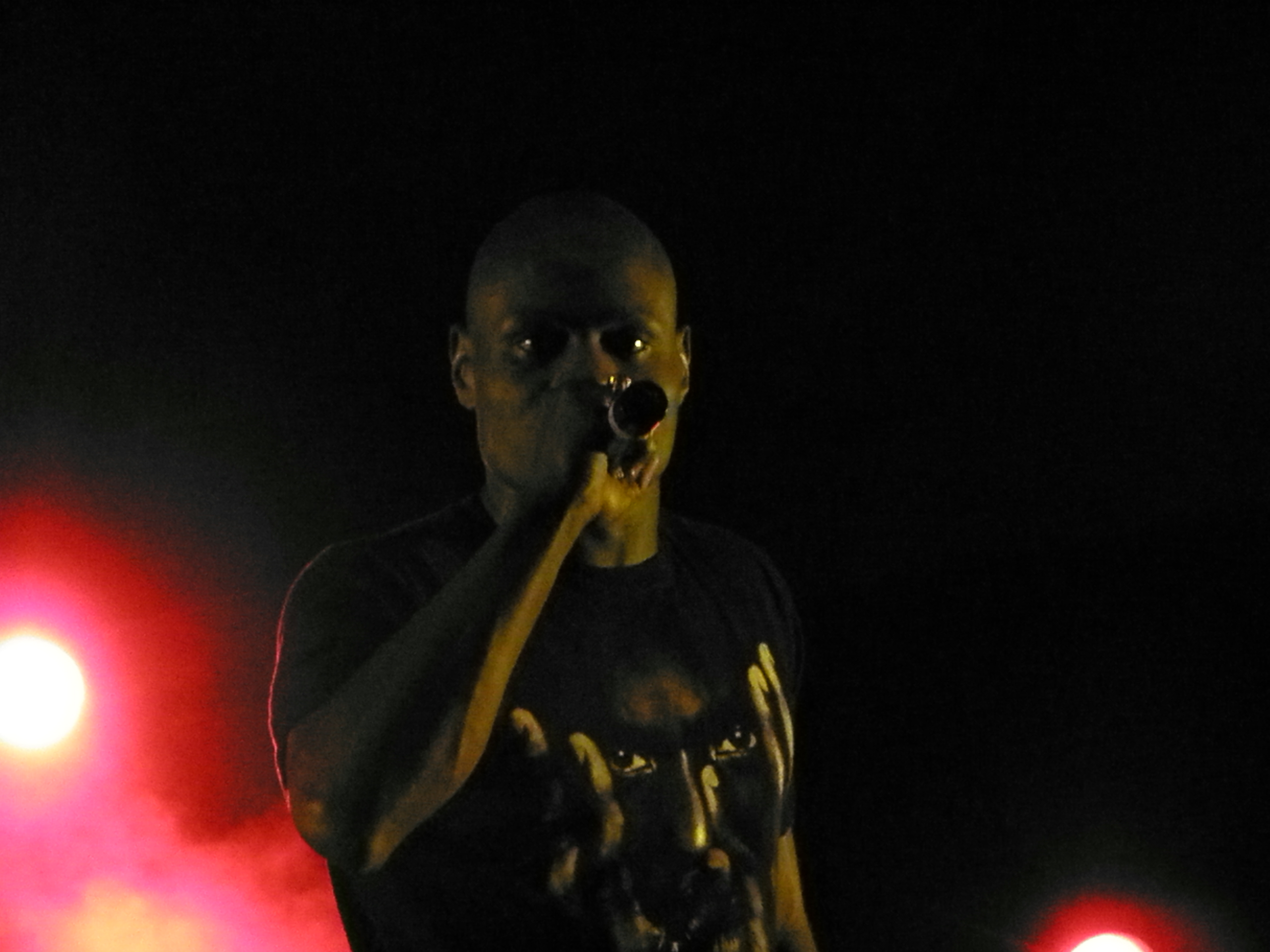
Hip hop artist Kery James

- Kery James, Guadeloupe-born hip hop artist, convert
- Soprano
- Médine
- Booba
- Kaaris
- Sadek
- DJ Snake

=== Politicians ===
- Fadela Amara, social worker and feminist activist, former government minister
- Kader Arif, politician, former government minister and current member of the European Parliament
- Azouz Begag, Légion d'Honneur recipient, researcher in economics and sociology, former government minister
- Rachida Dati, lawyer, former Minister of Justice, current Minister of Culture
- Mounir Mahjoubi, technologist, businessman, current Secretary of State for Digital Affairs (came out as gay in 2018).
- Rama Yade, politician, former government minister.

=== Academics and writers ===
- Yasmine Belkaid, immunologist, current president of the Pasteur Institute
- Ghaleb Bencheikh, scientist
- Jean-Louis Michon, writer, translator, convert
- Louis du Couret, explorer, military officer, writer, convert
- René Guénon, author, intellectual, convert
- Roger Garaudy, author, philosopher, convert
- Christian Bonaud, author, philosopher, convert
- Éric Geoffroy, Islamologist, author, convert
- Denis Gril, Islamologist, writer, convert
- Michel Chodkiewicz, Islamogist, writer, convert
- Eva de Vitray-Meyerovitch, Islamologist, writer, convert

=== Business people ===
- Mohed Altrad, businessman, rugby chairman, and writer
- Mourad Boudjellal, businessman, founder of Soleil Productions comic publishing and sport manager

=== Religious figures ===
- Kahina Bahloul French imam (first female imam in France) and Islamic academic, advocate for modernist reforms in Islam.
- Dalil Boubakeur, physician, rector of Great Mosque of Paris
- Si Kaddour Benghabrit, founder of the Great Mosque of Paris, WW2 resistant, interfaith helper and candidate to official title of Righteous among the Nations.

=== Television ===
- Rachid Arhab, journalist, member of Conseil supérieur de l'audiovisuel

== See also ==
- Demographics of France
- Religion in France
- Freedom of religion in France
- Islam in Marseille
- Islam in Besançon
- Franco-Ottoman alliance
- Turks in France
- Maghrebi Arabs
- Kabyle people
- Riffian people
- Maghrebis
- Immigration to Besançon
- Islamic terrorism in France
- Islamic terrorism in Europe
