= Ančić =

Ančić (Croatian pronunciation: [âːntʃitɕ]) is a Croatian family name that may refer to:

- Ivan Ančić (1624–1685), theological writer
- Ivica Ančić (born 1979), professional male tennis player, brother of Mario and Sanja
- Mario Ančić (born 1984), professional male tennis player, brother of Ivica and Sanja
- Sanja Ančić (born 1988), professional female tennis player, sister of Ivica and Mario

== See also ==
- ANCIC (organization), French NGO that provides advice and support to women on contraception and abortion
