= Immigration to France =

A French biometric residence permit issued to non-EU citizens

A French residence permit issued to EU citizens

In 2024, the United Nations estimated 9.2 million immigrants (foreign-born people) in France, representing 13.8% of the total population, making France the second largest foreign born population in Europe after Germany and tied with the United Kingdom. Ireland's foreign born population is over 20% in 2026 so is higher than France, Germany or UK. This is an increase from the United Nations statistics in 2015 in which there were 8 million immigrants (foreign-born people) in France, which at the time represented 11.5% of the country's total population.

The area with the largest proportion of immigrants is the Parisian urban area (Greater Paris), where almost 40% of immigrants lived in 2012. Other regions with important immigrant populations are Rhône-Alpes (Lyon) and Provence-Alpes-Côte d'Azur (Marseille).

The Paris region is a magnet for immigrants, hosting one of the largest concentrations of immigrants in Europe. As of 2006, about 45% of people (6 million) living in the region were either immigrant (25%) or born to at least one immigrant parent (20%).

Among the 802,000 newborns in metropolitan France in 2010, 27.3% had one or both parents foreign-born, and about one quarter (23.9%) had one parent or both born outside of Europe. Including grandparents, about 22% of newborns in France between 2006 and 2008 had at least one foreign-born grandparent (9% born in another European country, 8% born in Maghreb and 2% born in another region of the world).

In 2014, the National Institute of Statistics (INSEE) published a study reporting that the number of Spanish, Portuguese, and Italian immigrants in France between 2009 and 2012 has doubled. This increase resulting from the financial crisis that hit several European countries in that period, has pushed up the number of Europeans settled in France. Statistics on Spanish immigrants in France show a growth of 107 percent between 2009 and 2012, i.e. in this period went from 5,300 to 11,000 people.

Of the total of 229,000 new foreigners coming to France in 2012, nearly 8% were Portuguese, British 5%, Spanish 5%, Italians 4%, Germans 4%, Romanians 3%, and Belgians 3%.

By 2022, the total number of new foreigners coming to France rose above 320,000 for the first time, with nearly a majority coming from Francophone Africa (Former French Colonies). A significant increase in students, family reunification and labor migration occurred under the presidency of Emmanuel Macron.

== History ==
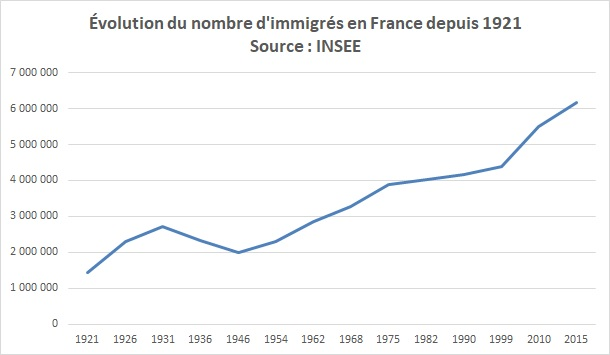
Annual immigration to France from 1921 to 2015

The population dynamics began to change in the middle of the nineteenth century, as France joined the Industrial Revolution. The pace of industrial growth attracted millions of European immigrants over the next century, with especially large numbers arriving from Poland, Belgium, Portugal, Italy, and Spain. In the wake of the First World War, in which France suffered six million casualties, significant numbers of workers from French colonies arrived. By 1930, the Paris region alone had a North African Muslim population of 70,000.

Large numbers of Belgians emigrated to France in the late-nineteenth century (there were nearly 500,000 Belgians in France in 1886), as well as Italians. The interwar era was marked by the arrival of numerous Poles (500,000 in 1931), Spaniards, Russians and Armenians.

=== 1945–1974 ===
After the Second World War, postwar immigration to France significantly increased. During the period of reconstruction, France experienced labour shortages, and as a result; the French government was eager to recruit immigrants coming from all over Europe, the Americas, Africa and Asia.

Although there was a presence of Vietnamese in France since the late-nineteenth century (mostly students and workers), a wave of Vietnamese migrated to the country after the Battle of Dien Bien Phu and the Geneva Accords, which granted Vietnam its independence from France in 1954. These migrants consisted of those who were loyal to the colonial government and those married to French colonists. Following the partition of Vietnam, students and professionals from South Vietnam continued to arrive in France. Although many initially returned to the country after a few years, as the Vietnam War situation worsened; the vast majority of Vietnamese decided to remain in France and brought their families over as well.

This period also saw a significant wave of immigrants from Algeria. Before 1962, Algerians were not restricted, as a result of the 1945 Code of Nationality. In 1954, the Algerian War started, the result of which led to 200,000 Algerian immigrants moving to France. However, because of the tensions between the Algerians and the French, these immigrants were no longer welcome. This conflict between the two sides led to the Paris Massacre of 17 October 1961, when the police used force against an Algerian demonstration on the streets of Paris. After the war, after Algeria gained its independence, the free movement between France and Algeria was once again allowed, and the number of Algerian immigrants started to increase drastically. From 1962-75, the Algerian immigrant population increased from 350,000 to 700,000. Many of these immigrants were known as the "harkis," and the others were known as the "pieds-noirs." The "harkis" were Algerians who supported the French during the Algerian War; once the war was over, they were deeply resented in Algeria, and thus sought safety in France. The "pieds-noirs" were European settlers who moved to Algeria, but migrated back to France following Algerian independence in 1962.

Additionally, the number of Pakistani and Japanese immigrants also increased during this period. There was also a great number of students and workers from former French colonies in Africa. In the 1960s, there was a wave of Portuguese, Moroccan and Turkish immigrants.

With this massive influx of immigrants, France became an asylum for refugees. According to the convention in Geneva, refugee status was granted to four out of five overseas applicants. Many of these refugees came from countries in Eastern Europe (i.e. Hungary) and Latin America, because they feared oppression in their countries of origin.

Although the majority of immigrants at this time came from rural regions, only 6% of them were willing to work in agriculture. About two-thirds of the immigrants worked in mining, steel, construction, and automotive industries. Approximately 12% of male immigrants and the majority of female immigrants worked in domestic services, restoration, and commerce (as for French women, a woman working was subject to her husband's authorisation until 1965.) Youth and elderly immigrants usually worked in craftsmanship and small scale trades.

=== 1974–present ===
During the 1970s, France simultaneously faced economic crisis and allowed immigrants (mostly from the Muslim world) to permanently settle in France with their families and to acquire French citizenship. It resulted in hundreds of thousands of Muslims, especially to the larger cities, living in subsidized public housing and suffering from very high unemployment rates. Alongside this, France renounced its policy of assimilation, instead pursuing a policy of integration.

In 1974, France restricted immigration from its former colonies, but immigration from former colonies in the Maghreb and West Africa would end up steadily increasing under the presidencies of Nicolas Sarkozy, François Hollande and Emmanuel Macron. In the late 20th century and in the 21st century, immigration has diversified, with many immigrants originating from Sub-Saharan Africa (922,000 in 2019), Asia (486,000 in 2019) and Latin America. In addition, the enlargement of the European Union has led to more Eastern European immigrants.

According to an Ipsos poll in September 2019, 65% of respondents in France said that accepting migrants did not improve the situation in France and 45% responded that accepting migrants deprived the French of social services.

In 2019, 46.5% of all immigrants were born in Africa, 35.3% were born in Europe, 14.7% in Asia and 5.4% in the Americas and Oceania. In 2020, non-EU citizens had employment rates less than 50% in the southern and southwestern regions of France and in the north and northeastern regions and was above 65% only in the Burgundy region.

The African proportion of both migrants and residents in France is increasing, as by 2022, nearly a majority, 48.2%, of all immigrants living in France come from Africa, 32.3% come from Europe, 13.5% come from Asia and 6% come from the Americas and Oceania. 61.7% of all immigrants living in France come from non-European origins in 2022. By 2022, the total number of new foreigners coming to France rose above 320,000 for the first time, with a significant increase in students, family reunification and labour migration from African and Asian countries happening under the presidency of Emmanuel Macron.

A 2023 survey carried out by Jean-Paul Gourévitch for the Contribuables associés association (English: Associated Taxpayers) found that the estimated cost of immigration to France for French taxpayers was of about €53,900,000,000 per year, four times more than the Justice ministry's yearly budget.

In June 2025, the UDR (right) group in the French Parliament, led by Éric Ciotti, called for the creation of a parliamentary commission to calculate the true cost of immigration. Ciotti is demanding a detailed assessment of French spending on health, housing, education, and emergency aid to migrants, as well as their economic contributions.

== Origins of immigrants ==
=== Europeans ===
In 2014, the National Institute of Statistics (INSEE, for its acronym in French) published a study stating that the number of Italian, Portuguese and Spanish immigrants in France doubled between 2009 and 2012. According to the French Institute, this increase, resulting from the financial crisis that hit several European countries in that period, has pushed up the number of Europeans immigrating to France. Statistics on Spanish immigrants in France show a growth of 107 percent between 2009 and 2012, from 5,300 to 11,000 people. Of the total of 229,000 foreigners arriving to France in 2012, nearly 8% were Portuguese, British 5%, Spanish 5%, Italians 4%, Germans 3%, and Belgians 3%.

With the increase of Italian, Portuguese and Spanish immigrants to France, the weight of European immigrants reached 46 percent in 2012, while this percentage for African reached 30%, with a presence in Morocco (7%), Algeria (7%) and Tunisia (3%). Meanwhile, 14 percent of all immigrants who settled in France that year were from Asian countries—3% of China and 2% in Turkey, while in America and Oceania constitute 10% of Americans and Brazilians accounted for higher percentage, 2 percent each.

By 2022, as a result of rapidly increasing African immigration into France, the proportion of European immigrants declined from 46% in 2012 to 32.3%.

=== Maghrebis ===
French of Maghrebi (Arabs and Berbers) origin in France form the largest ethnic group after French of European origin.

According to Michèle Tribalat, a researcher at INED, there were 3.5 million people of Maghrebi origin (with at least one grandparent from Algeria, Morocco or Tunisia) living in France in 2005, corresponding to 5.8% of the total French metropolitan population (60.7 million in 2005). Maghrebis have settled mainly in the industrial regions in France, especially in the Paris region. Many famous French people like Edith Piaf, Isabelle Adjani, Arnaud Montebourg, Alain Bashung, Dany Boon, Zinedine Zidane, Karim Benzema, and Kylian Mbappé have Maghrebi ancestry.

In 2005, the percentage of young people under 18 of Maghrebi origin (at least one immigrant parent) were about 7% in Metropolitan France, 12% in Greater Paris, 13% in Lyon, 21% in Perpignan, 22% in French département of Seine-Saint-Denis, 37% in 18th arrondissement of Paris and 40% in several arrondissements of Marseille.

16% of newborns in France between 2006 and 2008 have at least one Maghrebi grandparent.

Their number increased in the following years. According to other sources between 5 and 6 million people of Maghrebi origin live in France corresponding to about 7-9% of the total French metropolitan population.

As of 2011, there were 4.5 million Algerians in France of which 42% were women.

By 2022, as result of both the African proportion of both migrants and residents in France increasing, nearly a majority, 48.2%, of all immigrants living in France come from Africa. Algeria, Morocco and Tunisia are the main countries of origin for immigrants into France in 2022.

=== Sub-Saharan Africans ===
Immigrants from Sub-Saharan Africa come primarily from the countries of Francophone Africa in West Africa and Central Africa, and also Madagascar. The most common countries of birth for these immigrants are Madagascar, Senegal, Ivory Coast, Cameroon, DRC, Mali, Republic of the Congo, Mauritius, Comoros and Guinea. Some of these immigrants have been settling in France for over a century, and were employed in various jobs such as soldiers (Senegalese Tirailleurs) and domestic workers; while others, such as Malians in France, started arriving mainly from the 1960s onward.

=== North Americans and South Americans ===
An important community of immigrants from North America to France are Haitians in France. Citizens of the United States of America total more than 100,000 permanent residents in France, Canadians 11,931, followed by Latin Americans are a growing sub-group the most numerous are the Brazilians 44,622, followed by Venezuelans 30,000, Peruvians 22,002, Chileans (esp. arrived in the 1970s) 15,782, and Argentineans 11,899 (or up to 15,000). Latin Americans are increasingly emigrating to France for economic reasons, study, work, family, and sometimes political asylum.

=== State provisioning on illegal immigration ===
Illegal immigration to France has developed as the country's immigration policy has become more rigid. There were between 890,000 and 1.2 million illegal immigrants in France, the second highest numbers of illegal immigrants in Europe after Germany.

In 2011, 28,000 of such people were expelled from France. The French government set a goal of 35,000 for the next year. The initialism 'OQTF', from the 2006 law obligation de quitter le territoire français, is sometimes used for a person who is required to leave France.

The French government threatened to withdraw from the Schengen accord in 2009, 2011 and 2012.

As of 2016, many undocumented immigrants tried to jump the fences at Calais and board a train or truck heading for the United Kingdom. The Home Office has agents working alongside French police and immigration agents to prevent unauthorized people from entering the British border zone.

== Île-de-France ==
In France, the three largest cities (Paris, Lyon and Marseille) also attract the largest share of immigrants to the country. The region with the largest proportion of immigrants is the Île-de-France (Greater Paris), where 40% of immigrants live. Immigrants are more concentrated in urban areas than the native population. 90.1% of the immigrant population is located in urban areas which is significantly more than the proportion for the native population, 81.9% of them living in urban areas. In 2012, 38.2% of the total immigrant population lived in the Parisian urban area compared to 4.1% and 3.1% respectively for Lyon and Marseille. According to INSEE, French National Institute for Statistics and Economic Studies, responsible for the production and analysis of official statistics in France, about 35% of people (4 million) living in Île-de-France, are either immigrant (17%) or born to at least one immigrant parent (18%) in 2006.

In the city of Paris, 20% of people living are immigrants and 41.3% of people under 20 have at least one immigrant parent. Among the young people under 18, 12.1% are of Maghrebi origin, 9.9% of non-French West Indies Subsaharan African origin and 4.0% of South European origin. 436,576 immigrants live in Paris, representing 20% of Parisians and 22.4% of immigrants in Ile-de-France. 162 635 children under 20 with at least one immigrant parent live in Paris, representing 41.3% of the total of children under 20 in Paris and 15.4% of the total of children under 20 with at least one immigrant parent in Ile-de-France

Département	Immigrants			Children under 20 with at least one immigrant parent		
Département	Number	% département	% Ile-de-France	Number	% département	% Ile-de-France
Paris (75)	436'576	20	22.4	162'635	41.3	15.4
Seine-Saint-Denis (93)	394'831	26.5	20.2	234'837	57.1	22.2
Hauts-de-Seine (92)	250'190	16.3	12.8	124'501	34	11.8
Val-de-Marne (94)	234'633	18.1	12	127'701	40	12.1
Val-d'Oise (95)	185'890	16.1	9.5	124'644	38.5	11.8
Yvelines (78)	161'869	11.6	8.3	98'755	26.4	9.3
Essonne (91)	150'980	12.6	7.7	94'003	29.6	8.9
Seine-et-Marne (77)	135'654	10.7	7	90'319	26	8.5
Île-de-France	1'950'623	16.9	100	1'057'394	37.1	100

== Statistics ==
=== By country of origin ===
According to UN estimates from mid-2020, the most common countries of birth of the foreign born population in France were:

• 1 - Algeria (1,637,000)

• 2 - Morocco (1,060,000)

• 3 - Portugal (640,000)

• 4 - Tunisia (445,000)

• 5 - Turkey (340,000)

• 6 - Italy (326,000)

• 7 - Spain (282,000)

• 8 - Germany (203,000)

• 9 - United Kingdom (170,000)

• 10 - Belgium (164,000)

=== By region of origin ===
Immigration into France was expected to exceed 300,000 in the early 2020s, as shown in table below.

Region	2004	2005	2006	2007	2008	2009	2010	2011	2012	2018
Europe	80 500	78 660	80 120	79 290	80 330	75 040	88 820	94 580	105 830	93 000
Africa	70 200	66 110	62 340	62 140	63 470	66 480	65 610	66 280	68 640	106 000
Asia	30 960	30 120	30 520	32 070	30 180	32 960	29 810	32 430	32 060	46 900
America and Oceania	19 810	19 990	20 460	18 770	21 440	20 450	26 270	23 360	23 070	27 000
All countries	201 470	194 880	193 440	192 270	195 420	194 930	210 510	216 650	229 600	273 000

Place of Birth	Year	
Place of Birth	2011	
Place of Birth	Number	%
Place of birth in reporting country (France)	57,611,142	
Place of birth not in reporting country	7,321,237	
Other EU Member State	2,119,454	
Outside EU but within Europe	313,555	
Outside Europe/ Non-European	5,201,782	
Africa	3,596,143	
Asia	925,183	
North America	77,569	
Caribbean, South or Central America	279,529	
Oceania	9,803	
Total	64,933,400	100%

=== By country ===
Recent immigrants arriving to France as per 2014 and 2023
Country	% of all immigrants in France 2012	% of all immigrants in France 2021
Portugal	8%	8%
United Kingdom	5%	
Spain	5%	3%
Italy	4%	4%
Germany	4%	
Romania	3%	
Belgium	3%	
Russia	2%	
Switzerland	2%	
Poland	2%	
Algeria	7%	12%
Morocco	7%	12%
Tunisia	3%	4%
China	3%	
Turkey	2%	3%
United States	2%	
Brazil	2%	

=== INSEE Data Reporting ===
With the increase of Spanish, Portuguese and Italians in France, the weight of European immigrants arrived in 2012 to 46 percent, while this percentage for African reached 30%, with a presence in Morocco (7%), Algeria (7%) and Tunisia (3%). Meanwhile, 14 percent of all immigrants who settled in France that year were from Asian countries - 3% of China and 2% in Turkey, while in America and Oceania constitute 10% of Americans and Brazilians accounted for higher percentage, 2 percent each.

In 2008, according to The National Institute of Statistics (INSEE), there were 12 million immigrants and their direct descendants (2nd generation) making up about 20% of the population. with an immigrant defined as a foreign born person without French citizenship at birth. Without considering citizenship at birth, people not born in metropolitan France and their direct descendants made up 30% of the population aged 18–50 in metropolitan France in 2008.

In 2008, there were 5.3 million immigrants corresponding to 8.5% of the total population in France (63.9 million in 2008). 42% were from Africa (30% from Maghreb and 12% from Sub-Saharan Africa), 38% from Europe (mainly from Portugal, Italy and Spain), 14% from Asia and 5% from the Americas and Oceania. Of this total, 40% have assumed French citizenship. In addition, 1.8 million people born in foreign countries (including 1 million in Maghreb) with French citizenship at birth were not included in this total.

There were also 6.7 million direct descendants of immigrants (born in France with at least one immigrant parent) living in France in 2008, corresponding to 11% of the total population in France. Immigrants aged 18–50 count for 2.7 million (10% of population aged 18–50) and 5.3 million for all ages (8% of population). 2nd Generation aged 18–50 make up 3.1 million (12% of 18–50) and 6.5 million for all ages (11% of population). The regions with the largest proportion of immigrants and direct descendants of immigrants are the Île-de-France and Provence-Alpes-Côte d'Azur/Languedoc-Roussillon, where more than one third and one quarter of the inhabitants respectively were either immigrants or direct descendants of immigrants.

The table shows immigrants and 2nd generation immigrants by origin in 2008. It leaves aside 3rd generation immigrants, illegal immigrants, as well as ethnic minorities with long-standing French citizenship like black people from the French overseas territories residing in metropolitan France (800,000), Roms (500,000) or people born in the Maghreb with French citizenship at birth and their descendants (about 4 million Maghrebi Jews, Harkis and Pied-Noirs and their descendants live in France).

Immigrants by origin (2008) in thousands	Immigrants	2nd generation	Total	%
Italy	317	920	1 237	10.4%
Portugal	581	660	1 241	10.4%
Spain	257	620	877	7.3%
Other countries from UE27	653	920	1 573	13.2%
Other European countries	224	210	434	3.6%
Europe Total	2 032	3 330	5 362	44.9%
Algeria	713	1 000	1 713	14.3%
Morocco	654	660	1 314	11.0%
Tunisia	235	290	525	4.4%
Maghreb Total	1 602	1 950	3 552	29.7%
Subsaharan Africa	669	570	1 239	10.4%
Turkey	239	220	459	3.8%
SouthEast Asia	163	160	323	2.7%
Other Asian countries	355	210	565	4.7%
America/Oceania	282	170	452	3.8%
Other Regions Total	1 708	1 330	3 038	25.4%
Total	5 342	6 610	11 952	100.00%

In 2005, 18.1% of young people under 18 were of foreign origin (at least one immigrant parent) in France including 13.5% of non-European origin. Ile-de-France has the highest proportion of total young people with foreign origins, including Europe and non-European, at about 37%.

People under 18 of Maghrebi, Sub-saharian and Turkish origin became a majority in several cities of Ile-de-France (Clichy-sous-Bois, Mantes-la-Jolie, Grigny, Saint-Denis, Les Mureaux, Saint-Ouen, Sarcelles, Pierrefitte-sur-Seine, Garges-lès-Gonesse, Montfermeil, La Courneuve, Sevran, Aubervilliers, Argenteuil, Évry, Stains, Gennevilliers et Épinay-sur-Seine). Youth of non-European origin became a majority in a few areas outside the Ile-de-France also, in particular in Vaulx-en-Velin close to Lyon, as well as Vénissieux, Rillieux-la-Pape and Wazemmes in Lille, in Grand Parc in Bordeaux, and in several arrondissements of Marseille. In Grigny, 31% of young people are of Sub-saharian origin.

Between 2006 and 2008 about 22% of newborns in France had at least one foreign-born grandparent (9% born in another European country, 8% born in Maghreb and 3% born in another region of the world).

In 2010, 27.3% of the 802,000 newborns in metropolitan France had at least one foreign-born parent. In 2010, about one quarter (24%) of all the newborns had at least one parent born outside of Europe, with about 17% of newborns in France having at least one parent originate from Africa (11% from Maghreb and 6% from Subsaharan Africa).

In May 2025, according to INSEE, the increase in educational attainment was greatest among African immigrants. One in two African immigrants now has a higher education diploma, compares to just under one in three in 2006.

=== Posted workers of Europe ===
Regarding the country of origin of "posted workers", the same document states the origin of the posted workers: Poles represent the largest contingent of employees posted to France (18% of the total), followed by the Portuguese (15%) and Romania (13%). The majority of these employees, about 60% comes from the historical countries of the European Union, but the share from the new Member States "EU" is growing very rapidly, and the nationals of countries outside "EU "also increases.

=== Asylum ===
In April 2025, a survey conducted by the CSA Institute revealed that a majority of the French population wanted stricter conditions for access to asylum in France.

=== Crime rates ===
A 2006 study found "that the share of immigrants in the population has no significant impact on crime rates once immigrants' economic circumstances are controlled for, while finding that unemployed immigrants tend to commit more crimes than unemployed non-immigrants." As shown in the 2006 study with 1999 French census data calculations, an unemployed nonimmigrant outlier raises the number of crimes by 0.297, and another raises it by 0.546.

Aoki and Yasuyuki's research show that data that is frequently shown regarding French immigration and crime is misleading, as it does not take discrimination and economic hardships into account as a motivator for criminal acts. As shown in the 2006 study, after adding the share of unemployed immigrants in the labor force, it is determined that the effect of the share of immigrants now becomes insignificant.

With the exception of 2015 in Macrotrends collection of data, French crime rates overall have been on the steady decline, experiencing a 5.68% decline from 2017 to 2018. However, immigration rates are on the incline, with a 10.74% increase of migrants granted asylum from 2017 to 2018. This data from 1990 to 2022 indicates that crime rates and migration rates do not correlate if one is only looking at the numbers, with no other qualitative factors in place.

A study by sociologist Farhad Khosrokhavar, director of studies at the EHESS, found that "Muslims, mostly from North African origin, are becoming the most numerous group in [French prisons]." His work has been criticized for taking into account only 160 prisoners in 4 prisons, all close to northern Paris where most immigrants live.

According to police figures, 77% of perpetrators of solved rapes in Paris during 2023 were of foreign nationality.

== Citizenship clauses ==
Children born in France to foreign parents with legal long-term residence in France are automatically granted French citizenship upon reaching the age of 18. People born abroad and living in France can acquire French citizenship if they satisfy certain conditions. In 2009 the number of naturalised persons was 135,000, with the largest contingent from Maghreb (41.2%). People who have worked in the French military can also get French citizenship.

Naturalisations by origin	2000	2005	2009	% Total 2009
Africa	84 182	98 453	85 144	62.7
Maghreb	68 185	75 224	56 024	41.2
Sub-Saharan Africa	10 622	15 624	22 214	16.4
Other Africa	5 375	7 605	6 906	5.1
Asia	27 941	26 286	19 494	14.4
South-East Asia	7 265	4 069	2 475	1.8
East Asia	1 139	1 280	1 622	1.2
South Asia	4 246	4 436	3 660	2.7
Middle East	15 291	16 501	11 737	8.6
Europe (not including CIS )	22 085	18 072	14 753	10.9
CIS	1 181	2 108	4 704	3.5
CIS (Europe)	1 000	1 535	4 454	3.3
CIS (Asia)	181	573	250	0.2
America	5 668	6 352	6 677	4.9
North America	1 048	854	747	0.5
South and Central America	4 620	5 498	5 930	4.4
Oceania	87	127	108	0.1
Others	8 882	3 245	4 962	3.7
Total	150 026	154 643	135 842	100

== Comparison with other European Union countries 2023 ==
According to Eurostat 59.9 million people lived in the European Union in 2023 who were born outside their resident country. This corresponds to 13.35% of the total EU population. Of these, 31.4 million (9.44%) were born outside the EU and 17.5 million (3.91%) were born in another EU member state.

Country	Total population (1000)	Total Foreign-born (1000)	%	Born in other EU state (1000)	%	Born in a non EU state (1000)	%
EU 27	448,754	59,902	13.3	17,538	3.9	31,368	6.3
Germany	84,359	16,476	19.5	6,274	7.4	10,202	12.1
France	68,173	11,985	19.6	2,204	3.4	9,781	16.2
Spain	48,085	8,204	17.1	1,580	3.3	6,624	13.8
Italy	58,997	6,417	10.9	1,563	2.6	4,854	8.2
Netherlands	17,811	2,777	15.6	748	4.2	2,029	11.4
Greece	10,414	1,173	11.3	235	2.2	938	9.0
Sweden	10,522	2,144	20.4	548	5.2	1,596	15.2
Austria	9,105	1,963	21.6	863	9.5	1,100	12.1
Belgium	11,743	2,247	19.1	938	8.0	1,309	11.1
Portugal	10,467	1,684	16.1	378	3.6	1,306	12.5
Denmark	5,933	804	13.6	263	4.4	541	9.1
Finland	5,564	461	8.3	131	2.4	330	5.9
Poland	36,754	933	2.5	231	0.6	702	1.9
Czech Republic	10,828	764	7.1	139	1.3	625	5.8
Hungary	9,600	644	6.7	342	3.6	302	3.1
Romania	19,055	530	2.8	202	1.1	328	1.7
Slovakia	5,429	213	3.9	156	2.9	57	1.0
Bulgaria	6,448	169	2.6	58	0.9	111	1.7
Ireland	5,271	1,150	21.8	348	6.6	802	15.2

== Opinion polls on immigration ==
In 1945, people from all occupation sectors were against migration, with 89% in the professions, 68% in the building industry and 79% in the iron and steel industry being opposed to immigration. In 1971, an INED poll was asked which gauged as to whether or not the French public thought there were too many foreigners (2.7 million, 5%) in the country. 2% thought there were too few, 39% thought the present number was about right while 40% thought it was too high and 12% much too high. In 1974, another INED poll asked as to whether or not a maximum should be set on the number of foreigners in the country. 70% thought there should be a maximum, 9% thought there should not, and 15% said it depended on the nationality. For the latter part, the majority of those who said it was dependent on the nationality thought there should be a maximum for non-European nationalities (Black Africans, 67%, North Africans, 87%), while less said there should be for European groups (Italians, 28%, Spanish, 33%, Portuguese, 43%, Yugoslavs, 37%). The majority additionally thought that European nationalities would "adapt easier into French life" in comparison to only 19% for North and Black Africans.

In an IFOP commissioned poll in 1973, the majority of the French public (very probable, 23%, fairly probable, 36%, slightly probable, 26%) believed that there would be an increase in the amount of foreigners in the country by the year 2000. The majority also thought that it represented a serious situation (very serious, 17%, fairly serious, 37%) comparatively to 39% (not very serious, 28%, not at all serious, 11%) of the public who did not.

In 1990, 76% of the French public thought there were too many Arabs in the country, 46% for Blacks, 40% for Asians and 24% for Jews.

== See also ==
- Demographics of France
- List of French people of immigrant origin
- French nationality law
- List of countries by immigrant population
- List of sovereign states and dependent territories by fertility rate
- Remigration
- Immigration to Besançon

== Bibliography ==
- Antonio Bechelloni, Michel Dreyfus, Pierre Milza (eds), L'intégration italienne en France. Un siècle de présence italienne dans trois régions françaises (1880–1980), Bruxelles, Complexe, 1995.
- Rogers Brubaker, Citizenship and Nationhood in France and Germany, Cambridge, Harvard University Press, 1992.
- Marie-Claude Blanc-Chaléard, Les Italiens dans l'Est parisien: Une histoire d'intégration (1880–1960), Rome, École Française de Rome, 2000.
- Stéphane Dufoix, Politiques d'exil: Hongrois, Polonais et Tchécoslovaques en France après 1945, Paris, Presses Universitaires de France, 2002.
- Jean-Philippe Dedieu, La parole immigrée. Les migrants africains dans l'espace public en France (1960–1995), Paris, Klincksieck, 2012.
- Yvan Gastaut, L'immigration et l'opinion en France sous la Ve République, Paris, Seuil, 2000.
- Goebel, Michael. Anti-Imperial Metropolis: Interwar Paris and the Seeds of Third World Nationalism, Cambridge, Cambridge University Press, 2015. excerpts
- Nancy L. Green, Les Travailleurs immigrés juifs à la Belle époque. Le Pletzlde Paris, Paris, Fayard, 1985.
- Donald L. Horowitz, Gérard Noiriel(eds), Immigrants in Two Democracies: French and American Experience, New York, New York University press, 1992.
- Gérard Noiriel, Le Creuset français. Histoire de l'immigration XIXe-XXe, Paris, Le Seuil, 1988.
- Gérard Noiriel, Réfugiés et sans-papiers. La République face au droit d'asile. XIXe-XXe, Paris, Hachette littératures, 1998.
- Janine Ponty, Polonais méconnus. Histoire des travailleurs immigrés en France dans l'entre-deux-guerres, Paris, Publications de la Sorbonne, 1988.
- Judith Rainhorn, Paris, New York. Des migrants italiens (années 1880 – années 1930), Paris, CNRS Éditions, 2005.
- Philippe Rygiel, Destins immigrés: Cher 1920–1980, trajectoires d'immigrés d'Europe, Besançon, Presses universitaires franc-comtoises, 2001.
- Ralph Schor, Histoire de l'immigration en France de la fin du XIXe à nos jours, Paris, Armand Colin, 1996.
- Alexis Spire, Étrangers à la carte. L'administration de l'immigration en France, 1945-1975, Paris, Grasset, 2005.
- Benjamin Stora, Ils venaient d'Algérie: L'immigration algérienne en France (1912–1992), Paris, Fayard, 1992.
- Vincent Viet, La France immigrée. Construction d'une politique (1914–1997), Paris, Fayard, 1998.
- Patrick Weil, La France et ses étrangers : L'aventure d'une politique de l'immigration de 1938 à nos jours, Paris, Gallimard, 2005.
- Patrick Weil, Qu'est-ce qu'un Français ? Histoire de la nationalité française depuis la Révolution, Paris, Grasset, 2002.
- Claire Zalc, Melting Shops. Une histoire des commerçants étrangers en France, Paris, Perrin, 2010.
