= Kahina Bahloul =

French imam (born 1979)

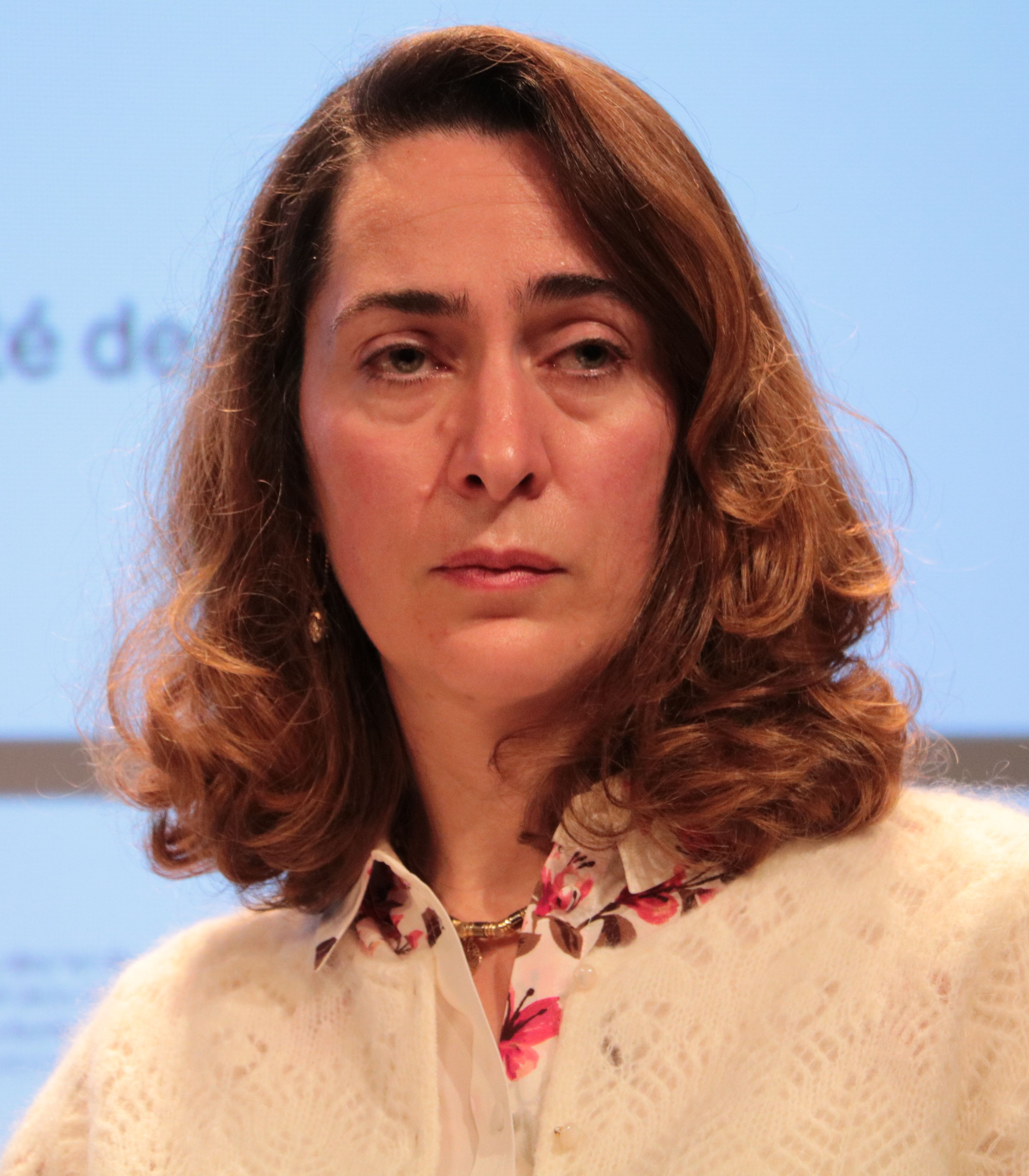
- Bahloul in 2021
- Title: Imam

Personal life
- Born: 1979 (age 46–47) Paris, France

Religious life
- Religion: Islam
- Denomination: Sunni Islam; Sufism
- Founder of: Fatima Mosque
- School: Islamic modernism; Liberal Islam

Kahina Bahloul (born 1979) is a French imam and Islamic academic. An adherent of Sunni Islam and Sufism, she became the first female imam in France in 2019, when she founded the unisex Fatima Mosque. She advocates liberalization and modernist reforms in Islam, including equal rights for women in Islam, the creation of a distinct French Muslim identity, and an individualist approach to religion and spirituality. Bahloul does not wear a veil, which she sees as a symbol of Islamism. She opposes traditional and conservative interpretations of the Quran and their dominance in the Muslim world.

Born in Paris to an interfaith family, Bahloul grew up in Algeria where she was raised by her Muslim father. He taught her about Islam from a humanist perspective, and her faith was shaken by Islamic fundamentalism and Islamism that took hold during the Algerian Civil War. Bahloul returned to France in 2003 where she worked in insurance. The death of her father in 2009 led her to explore Sufism and become an Islamic academic. Multiple acts of Islamic terrorism in 2015 motivated her to reform and redefine Islam, leading her to found the Fatima Mosque and become an imam.

== Early life ==
=== Childhood in Algeria ===
Kahina Bahloul was born in Paris in 1979 to a French mother and a Kabyle Algerian father. Her family was interfaith: her father's family was Sufi Muslim, and her atheist mother was the child of a French Catholic man and a Polish Jewish woman. As a child, Bahloul was raised in the Kabylia region of Algeria. Her mother moved back to France, so she was raised by her father and his family. She became fluent in Arabic, French, and Berber.

Though her father had little formal knowledge about Islam, he taught her to practice the religion in conjunction with humanism and progressivism. She never left Islam, but she distanced herself from the religion as a teenager because she felt unwelcome as a woman. While in Kabyila, Bahloul obtained her master's degree in law. She took interest in Algerian law's adherence to Sharia, as opposed to other places where Western law was inherited through colonialism. In her view, patriarchy in Algeria prioritized men over Sharia. As the Algerian Civil War progressed, Bahloul objected to what she saw as fundamentalist Islam being imported to Algeria from Saudi Arabia, including the expectation of women to wear a hijab. She became more hostile to religion as her ideal of ethical humanist belief was challenged by the presence of Islamism around her.

=== Life in France ===
Bahloul returned to France in 2003, a decision that she attributed to the country's principles of democracy and gender equality. She considered French society liberating, especially because she was allowed to choose what clothes to wear. The global perception of Islam, including the aftermath of the September 11 attacks, gave her further reservations about the religion. The death of her father in 2009 revitalized Bahloul's interest in religion. She coped with his death through the works of Syrian poet Khaled Roumo. Though she initially took interest in Buddhism, a Christian doctor suggested that she explore Sufism. She found that secularism in France gave religion meaning to her, as she was allowed to choose her beliefs instead of being expected to follow the religion.

Bahloul stopped attending mosques in 2014 because of sex segregation that she said resulted in lower quality facilities for Muslim women. She spent 12 years working in the insurance business before leaving the career in 2015 to return to her studies, and she attended the École pratique des hautes études to obtain a doctorate in Islamic studies. It was at this time that she explored Sufism and mysticism in Islam, which she studied under Cheikh Bentounès in his progressive Alawya Sufi order.

France saw a rise in Islamic terrorism in the 2010s, which brought a crackdown on Muslim communities, including closures of mosques and investigations into their funding. Bahloul saw this as evidence that French Muslims needed to "reclaim their faith". The Charlie Hebdo shooting in 2015 and the Paris attacks the same year reminded her of the oppression that she saw carried out in Islam's name while she lived in Algeria and the violence of the civil war. The attacks convinced her that she should become involved in Islamic reform, and she decided to become an imam. To further her involvement, she began sharing her religious beliefs when she created Parle moi d'Islam (transl. Talk to me about Islam) on YouTube.

== Imamate and Fatima Mosque ==
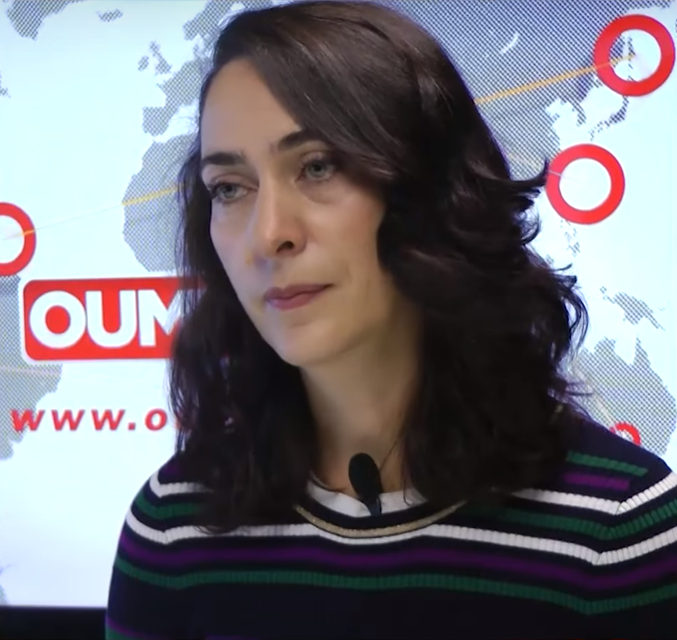
Bahloul in 2019

Bahloul set out to create a unisex place of worship, and she applied for the establishment of Fatima Mosque in November 2018, co-founding it with philosophy professor Faker Korchane. Bahloul was recognized as an imam in May 2019, making her the first French woman to hold the title. She delivered her first sermon to a mixed gender group of ten women and twelve men. As she became a prominent figure in the French Muslim community, she held workshops in Drancy about Islamic prophets with the Alawya order, and she co-founded La Maison de la Paix, which provided Sufi teachings in Paris with the Norwegian imam Annika Skattum. La Maison de la Paix lacked funding and closed after one year.

Bahloul formally announced the creation of Fatima Mosque in September 2019, making the announcement at Saint-Jean Lutheran Church. Men and women are allowed to pray together on opposite sides of the prayer hall, and the imam leading prayers alternates between a man and a woman each week. It allows worship by non-Muslims, welcomes LGBT people, and conducts marriages between Muslim women and non-Muslim men. As the project became known, Bahloul received derision and threats from the most conservative adherents of Islam. She has stated that being afraid of threats would prevent her from accomplishing anything, and she dismisses them as "young people having fun on social networks". Crowdfunding was held to establish a permanent location, but it was unsuccessful. Instead, rooms are rented each week, the exact locations kept secret to avoid violence. The first service was held in February 2020, but the COVID-19 pandemic began shortly afterward, and the mosque's activity was held online until the following year.

Bahloul wrote a memoir, Mon islam, ma liberté (transl. My Islam, My Freedom), in 2021. She was identified by Forbes as one of the 40 most important women in France the same year. Fatima Mosque became less active online in 2022 and it came to focus on a smaller group of members. Korchane left the mosque in 2023 in protest of Bahloul's support of French religious policies such as an abaya ban.

== Religious and political views ==
Bahloul is a Sunni Muslim, and she adheres to Sufism as taught by Ibn Arabi. She invokes Sufism as a form of individualist Islam that is free of dogma. Abu Bakr al-Razi, Mohammed Arkoun, Rabia Basri, and Emir Abdelkader are other influences. Her understanding of Islam is one based in love demonstrated by submission to Allah. Bahloul believes that Islam should emphasize spirituality over orthodoxy and radicalism. Bahloul supports the liberalization of Islam and individual reading and interpretation of the Quran. She is critical of mainstream Islamic scholarship, alleging that it "emanates from medieval thought." She believes that the lack of central authority in Islam invites new interpretations and personal understandings of the religion, but that it has also allowed Islamic nationalism and anti-Western sentiment to replace liberal Islam. She considers social science to be a fundamental aspect of religion as a means of reform, and in her own life she substituted traditional religious training for academic Islamic studies.

Bahloul advocates equal rights for women in Islam and acceptance of women's participation in the religion. She believes in a form of Islamic feminism that unifies men and women in Islam by "rebuilding a complementary feminism," though she has expressed frustration with the idea that Islamic feminism must be made distinct from other types of feminism. Bahloul argues that society would be improved by a stronger feminine presence and that women have an obligation to challenge injustice. She opposes conservative sects of Islam, which she says view the religion from a male perspective, promoting patriarchy and misogyny. She also opposes the understanding of fiqh that places limits on inheritance and divorce for women. Bahloul argues that female imams are permitted by the Quran as it makes no mention of the role, but that the lack of female imams has led people to believe it is forbidden.

Bahloul has described the issue of veils for Muslim women as "very complex." She does not wear a veil, maintaining that it is not required by the Quran. She has insisted that women should be allowed to wear what they wish, but she has also condemned the use of a veil as Islamist and described its acceptance as a victory for Islamism. She opposed restrictions on veils in schools when they were proposed in 2019, but she supported such a restriction after it became law in 2021. Bahloul attributes her decision not to wear a veil, alongside her lighter skin, as reasons why she does not face discrimination in public the way many French Muslims do.

Bahloul has called for the development of a French Islamic religious identity distinct from that of Muslim-majority nations. She is critical of the French Council of the Muslim Faith, arguing that it represents the Islamic governments of other nations rather than French Muslims. Bahloul has criticized the French government for working with the council and mosques backed by other nations. Her movement is distinct from other reformist Islamic groups in that it supports French secularism and movement of religion to the private space. Bahloul considers the collectivist Islamic philosophy of ummah to apply to all people instead of just Muslims. On the issue of the Israeli–Palestinian conflict, she has objected to equating Judaism with Zionism and equating Palestinian nationalism with Islamism.
