= Religion in Marseille =

Modern-day Marseille's cultural diversity is reflected in the wide variety of religious beliefs of its citizens.

== Christianity ==
=== Catholicism ===
The Archdiocese of Marseille is a metropolitan archdiocese of the Latin Church of the Catholic Church in France. The Archepiscopal see is in the city of Marseille, and the diocese comprises the arrondissement of Marseille, a subdivision of the department of Bouches-du-Rhône in the region of Provence-Alpes-Côte d'Azur.

In 2013 there were 715,000 Catholics in Marseille, forming 68.2% of the total population of the diocese.

== Buddhism ==
According to Smithsonian Magazine, there is a small community of Buddhists in Marseille of 3,000. The Phap Hoa Pagoda is the largest Buddhist place of worship in the city, founded in 1990 by a Buddhist monk, Thích Thiền Định.

== Islam ==
As official data on religion are generally not collected in France on the principle of secularism ("laïcité"), the precise number of Muslims in Marseille is not available. An unverified source estimate Muslims to constitute 20% of the city's population. A survey of high-school students carried out in 2000–2001 suggests that 30–40% of young people have a Muslim background. In 2015, The Guardian reported that were 250,000 Muslims in Marseille.

In Marseille, there are seven halal abattoirs during Eid al-Adha, 73 prayer spaces, including 10 in the city centre. The city still does not have an official mosque.

=== Religiosity ===
According to a 2011 survey, three-quarters of the Muslims in Marseille considered themselves actively observant Muslims, one-quarter responded no, and 3% of respondents declined to answer. Of those who considered themselves actively observant, 40% stated that they prayed, and 11% added that they attended a mosque on a regular basis. The intensity of religious practice was not gender-related; a few more women indicated they actively practised (39%, in comparison with 35% of men).

=== History ===
==== Immigration to Marseille ====
Muslim immigration from the Maghreb (Algeria, Morocco, Tunisia) started to increase in the 1970s. Marseille's population of Algerian descent is estimated to be at least 150,000. Over the last 30 years, the city has become the main destination for Comorians immigrants. As of 2014, there are approximately 61,700 Turks also living in Marseille.

== Judaism ==
The Museum of the Jewish People at Beit Hatfutsot estimated that around 80,000 Jews lived in Marseille in 2013, comprising just under 10% of the city's population. In 2017, Marseille had the third-largest Jewish population of any urban centre in Europe. There are around 50 synagogues in Marseilles, 47 of which are Orthodox.

== Sources ==
- Lorcerie, Françoise; Geisser, Vincent (2011). At Home in Europe Project: Muslims in Marseille (PDF). New York City, United States: Open Society Foundations. ISBN 978-1-936133-15-4.
