= ANCIC (organization) =

Non-governmental organization

- Association Nationale des Centres d’Interruption volontaire de grossesse et de Contraception
- Formation: 1979
- Type: Nonprofit organization, non-governmental organization with consultant status in France
- Headquarters: BP 84; Maison des associations du 14è 22 rue Deparcieux; 75014 Paris, France
- Co-presidents: Laurence Danjou; Chrystel Mathurin Bornat; Emmanuelle Lhomme
- Website: www.ancic.asso.fr

The National Association of Abortion and Contraception Centers (Association Nationale des Centres d'Interruption volontaire de grossesse et de Contraception or ANCIC) is a non-profit, non-governmental association of persons and professionals who work in pregnancy and abortion planning centers, in the private or public sector, in France, who provide advice on and support for abortion and contraception.

It is also active in the support of women's rights, participates in the theoretical and empirical research on sexuality and procreation, and supports the sexual education of the public.

== History ==
The association was founded in 1979, under Law 1901 that establishes Voluntary associations. Leading members credit the 1970s feminist struggles and the support of Simone Veil in establishing ANCIC.

It actively supported the passage of the 2012 law that allowed for free contraception to teenagers aged between 15 and 18 years old in France, though demanding that the service be extended to young people until the age of 25.

In 1991, during an international conference in Amsterdam titled "Abortion Matters", ANCIC co-founded the International Federation of Abortion and Contraception Professionals (Fédération Internationale des Associés Professionels de l'Avortement et de la Contraception or FIAPAC).

The association has participated in many drives abroad for women's equality, such as the 2018 action directed at the government of Poland for introducing a "regressive legislative proposal that would erode reproductive rights", a proposal still alive and debated in 2020.

In October 2020, the government in France announced the introduction of a bill punishing with jail terms and fines any doctor who provides virginity certificates for traditional, religious marriages. This would be part of draft legislation aimed at reinforcing "French secular values" and combating "Islamist separatism". ANCIC stated it supported the government's stand against "virginity tests", but warned that in some cases women were in "real danger" and "a ban would simply deny the existence of such community practices, without making them disappear". The association suggested that the issue be "tackled quite differently, so that women and men free themselves and reject the weight of [such] traditions."
