= Jean-Paul Gourévitch =

French essayist

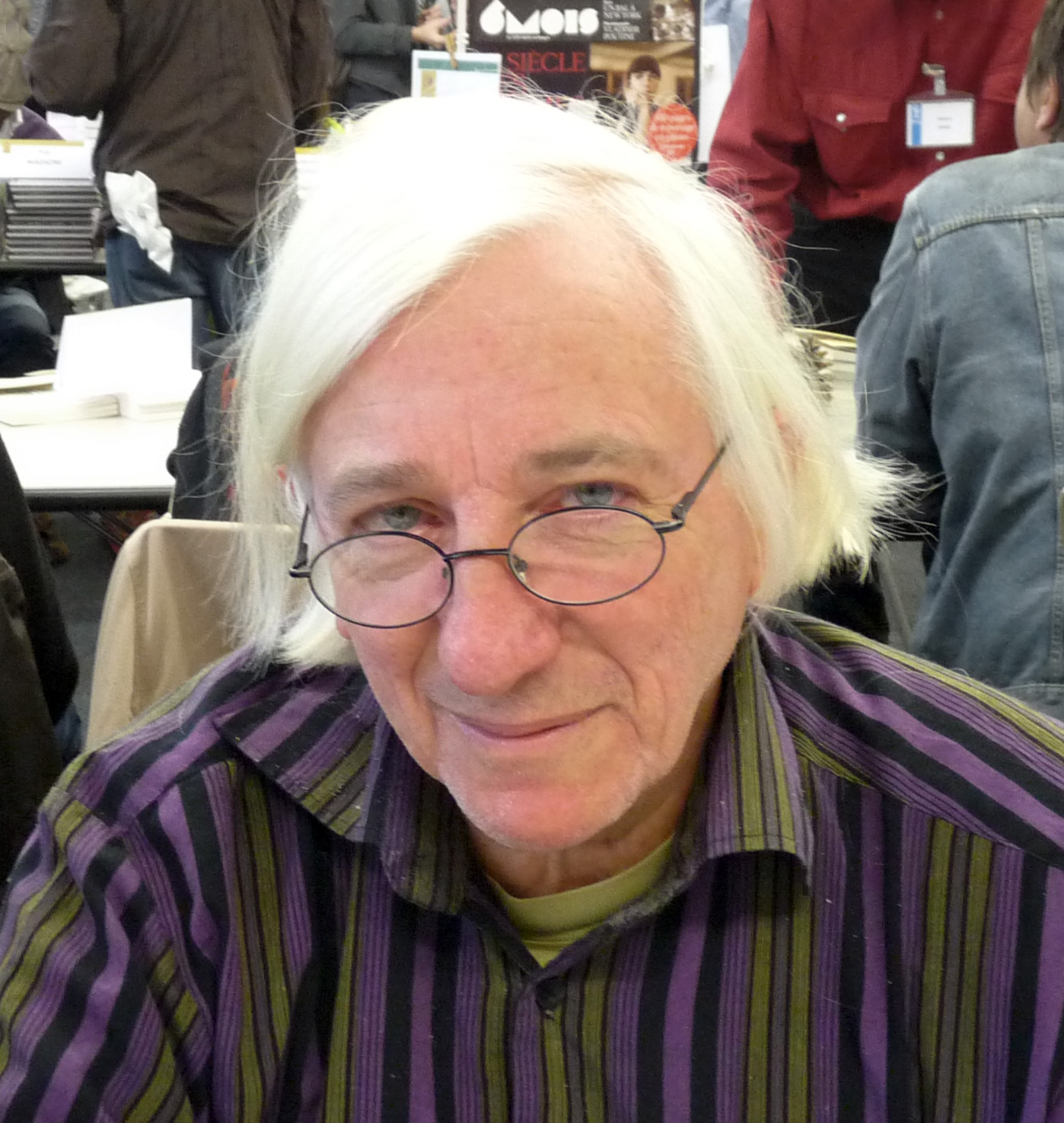

Jean-Paul Gourévitch (born September 7, 1941) is a French essayist. He is mainly known for his studies on migration, Africa, Islamism and children's literature.

== Selected works ==
- Les Enfants et la poésie (1969)
- Clefs pour l'audiovisuel (1973)
- Maux croisés: suspense (2008)
- L'immigration, ça coûte ou ça rapporte? (2009)
- Les Africains de France (2009)
- Les migrations pour les nuls (2014)
- Les véritables enjeux des migrations (2017)
- La Méditerranée: Conquête, puissance, déclin (2018)
- La France en Afrique: 1520 - 2020 - Vérités et mensonges (2020)
