= Islam in Poland =

Islam in Europe by percentage of country population 95–100%: Azerbaijan; 90–95%: Turkey; Kosovo; 50–70%: Albania; Bosnia and Herzegovina; Kazakhstan; 30–35%: North Macedonia; 10–20%: France; Sweden; Georgia; Montenegro; 5–10%: Austria; Belgium; Bulgaria; Denmark; Germany; Liechtenstein; Luxembourg; Netherlands; Russia; Switzerland; United Kingdom; Spain; Greece; 4–5%: Serbia; 2–4%: Italy; Finland; Norway; Malta; Slovenia; Cyprus (Note: Only takes into account the Muslim population residing on land controlled by the Republic of Cyprus.); 1–2%: Croatia; Ireland; Ukraine; Andorra; < 1%: Iceland; Armenia; Belarus; Czech Republic; Estonia; Hungary; Latvia; Lithuania; Moldova; Monaco; Poland; Portugal; Romania; San Marino; Slovakia

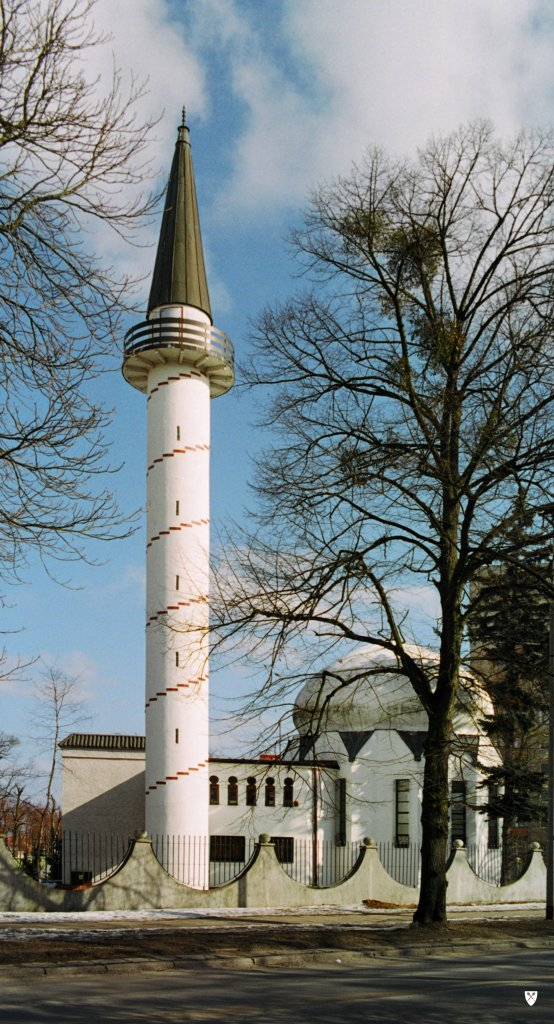
The Gdańsk mosque

A continuous presence of Islam in Poland began in the 14th century. From this time it was primarily associated with the Lipka Tatars, many of whom settled in the Polish–Lithuanian Commonwealth while continuing their traditions and religious beliefs. The first significant non-Tatar groups of Muslims arrived in Poland in the 1970s, though they are a very small minority.

Today, less than 0.02% of the population in Poland is Muslim. The majority of Muslims in Poland are Sunni.

== Beginnings ==
The first Tatar (Lipka) settlers arrived in the 14th century. Although Muslims were involved in earlier Mongol invasions of Poland in the 13th century, these had a purely military character and there are no traces of settlement or conversion of any parts of the Polish population.

On the other hand, Arab merchants including Muslims arrived in Polish lands during the time of Mieszko I, as can be seen by a large number of Arab coins found in numerous archaeological sites throughout modern Poland.

The Tatar tribes arriving in the 14th century settled in the lands of the Grand Duchy of Lithuania. Skilled warriors and great mercenaries, their settlement was promoted by the Grand Dukes of Lithuania, among them Gediminas, Algirdas and Kęstutis. The Tatars who settled in Lithuania, Ruthenia and modern-day eastern Poland were allowed to preserve their Islamic religion in exchange for military service. The initial settlements were mostly temporary and most of the Tatars returned to their native lands after their service expired. However, in the late 14th century Grand Duke Vytautas (named by the Tatars Wattad, that is defender of Muslims) and his brother King Władysław Jagiełło started to settle Tatars in the Polish–Lithuanian–Teutonic borderlands. The Lipka Tatars, as they are known, migrated from the lands of the Golden Horde and in large part served in the Polish–Lithuanian military. The largest of such groups to arrive to the area was a tribe of Tokhtamysh, who in 1397 rebelled against his former protector Tamerlane and sought asylum in the Grand Duchy. The Tatars under his command were all granted szlachta (nobility) status, a tradition that was preserved until the end of the Commonwealth in the late 18th century. Light Tatar cavalry, used both as skirmishers and reconnaissance troops took part in many of the battles against the foreign armies in the 15th century and afterwards, including the battle of Grunwald in which the Tatars fought commanded by their leader, Jalal ad-Din khan.

== 16th–18th century ==
In the 16th and 17th centuries, additional Tatars found refuge in the lands of the Polish–Lithuanian Commonwealth, mostly of Nogay and Crimean origin. After then until the 1980s, the Muslim faith in Poland was associated primarily with the Tatars. It is estimated that in the 17th century there were approximately 15,000 Tatars in the Commonwealth of a total population of 8 million. Numerous royal privileges, as well as internal autonomy granted by the monarchs of the Polish-Lithuanian Commonwealth, allowed the Tatars to preserve their religion, traditions and culture throughout the ages. The most notable military clans were granted with Coats of Arms and szlachta status, while many other families melted into the rural and burgher society. The first Tatar settlements were founded near the major towns of the Commonwealth in order to allow for fast mobilization of troops. Apart from religious freedom, the Tatars were allowed to marry Polish and Ruthenian women of Catholic or Orthodox faith, uncommon in Europe of that time. Finally, the May Constitution granted the Tatars with a representation in the Polish Sejm.

Perhaps the only moment in history when the Lipka Tatars fought against the Commonwealth was during the so-called Lipka Rebellion of 1672. The "Deluge" and the ensuing period of constant wars made the szlachta of central Poland associate the Muslim Lipkas with the invading forces of the Ottoman Empire. This, combined with the Counter-Reformation promoted by the Vasa dynasty led the Sejm to gradually limit the privileges of the Polish Muslims; among the measures taken were banning the repair of old Mosques and preventing new ones from being constructed, banning serfdom of Christians under Muslims, banning marriage of Christian females to Muslims, putting limitations on property ownership among Tatars. The Polish–Ottoman Wars fed into the discriminatory atmosphere against them and led to anti-Islamic writings and attacks.

Although King John Casimir of Poland tried to limit the restrictions on their religious freedoms and the erosion of their ancient rights and privileges, the gentry opposed him. Finally, in 1672, during the war with the Ottomans, the Lipka Tatar regiments (numbering up to 3,000 men) stationed in the Podolia region of south-east Poland abandoned the Commonwealth at the start of the Polish-Turkish wars that were to last to end of the 17th century with the Peace of Karłowice in 1699. Although the Lipkas initially fought for the victorious Turks, soon their camp was divided onto the supporters of the Turks and a large part of Tatars dissatisfied with the Ottoman rule. Although after the treaty of Buczacz the Tatars were granted lands around the fortresses of Bar and Kamieniec Podolski, the liberties enjoyed by their community within the Ottoman Empire were much less than those within the Commonwealth. Finally, in 1674, after the Polish victory at Chocim, the Lipka Tatars who held the Podolia for Turkey from the stronghold of Bar were besieged by the armies of Jan Sobieski, and a deal was struck that the Lipkas would return to the Polish side subject to their ancient rights and privileges being restored. All the Tatars were pardoned by Sobieski and most of them took part in his campaign against Turkey resulting in the brilliant victory in the battle of Vienna. The Lipka Rebellion forms the background to the novel Fire in the Steppe (Pan Wołodyjowski), the final volume of the Nobel Prize-winning historical Trylogia of Henryk Sienkiewicz. The 1969 film adaptation Colonel Wolodyjowski, directed by Jerzy Hoffman and starring Daniel Olbrychski as Azja Tuhaj-bejowicz, was one of the largest box-office success in the history of Polish cinema.

Although by the 18th century most of the Tatars serving in the military had become polonized, while the lower classes of the Muslim community gradually adopted the Ruthenian language (the predecessor of the modern Belarusian language), traditions were preserved. This led to formation of a distinctive Muslim culture of Central Europe, in which elements of Muslim orthodoxy mixed with religious tolerance and a relatively liberal society. For instance, the women in Lipka Tatar society traditionally had the same rights as men, were granted equal status and could attend common non-segregated schools.

== Early 20th century ==
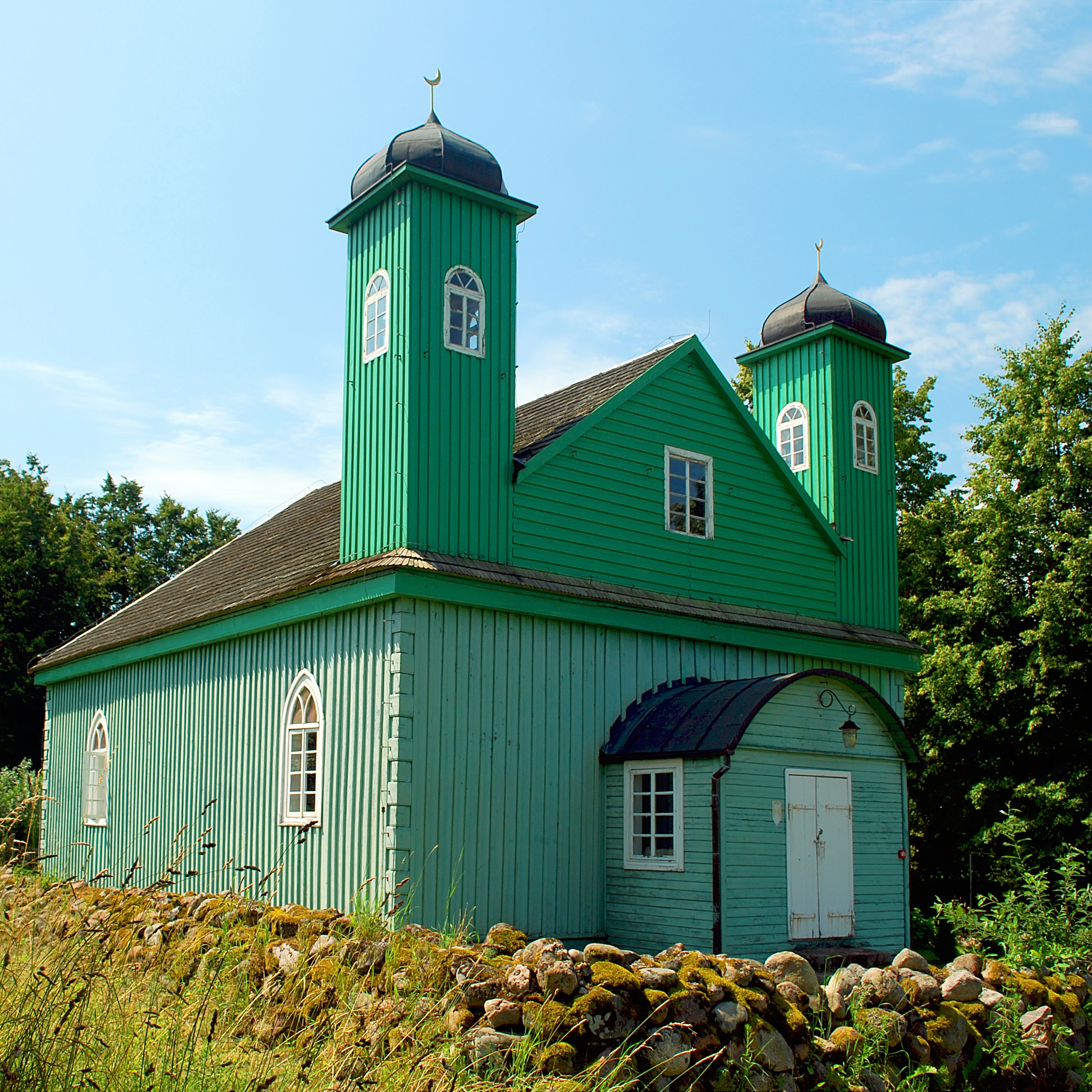
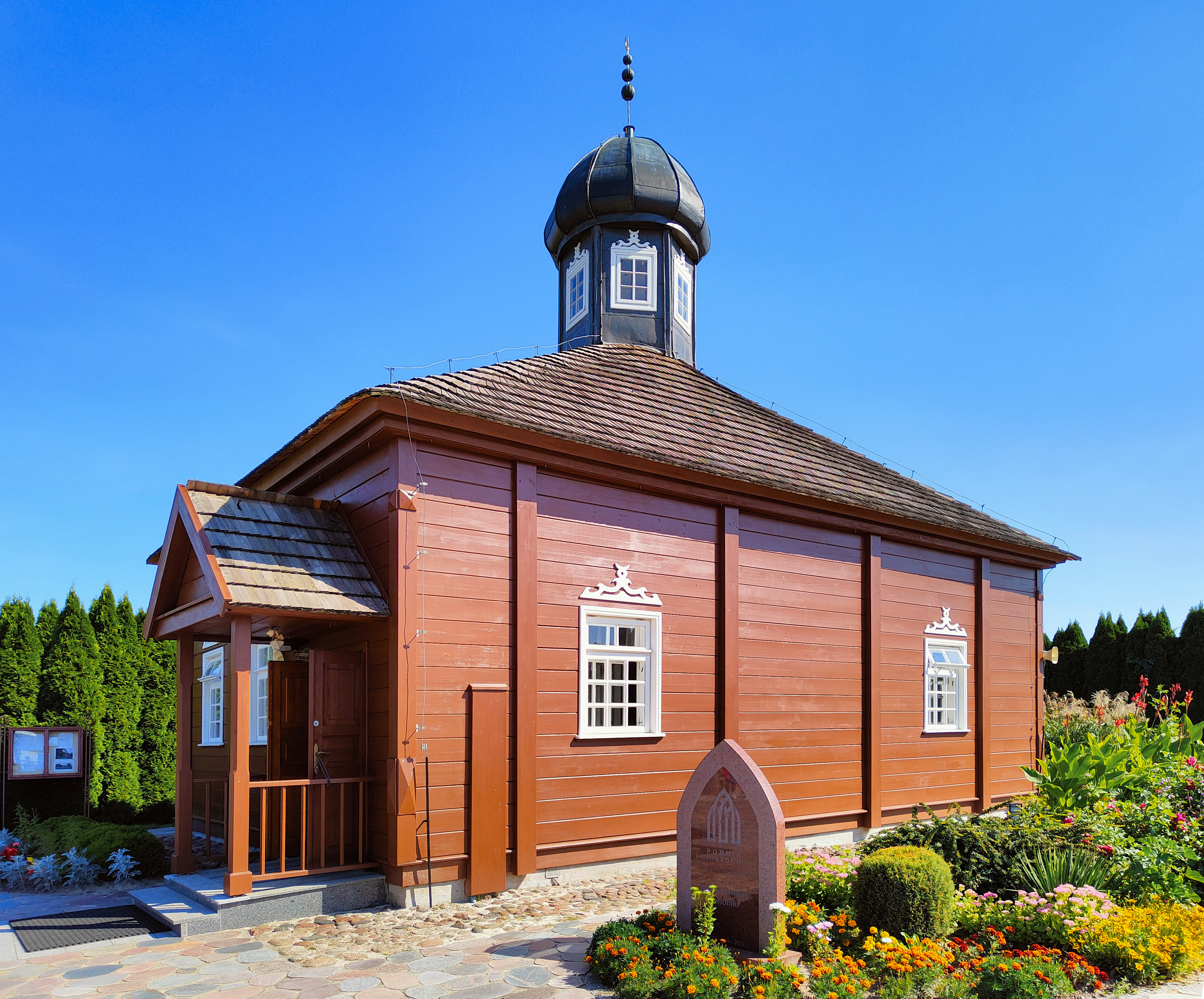
Kruszyniany Mosque (on the left) and Bohoniki Mosque (on the right), the oldest mosques in Poland, both listed as Historic Monuments of Poland.

By the beginning of the 20th century, Lipka Tatars had become so integrated into Polish society that they joined their Roman Catholic brethren in the mass migrations for the United States that gave rise to American Polonia, even founding their own mosque in Brooklyn, New York, which is still in use today. In 1919, at the outbreak of the Polish–Soviet War, two of the Tatar officers serving with the Polish Army Col. Maciej Bajraszewski and Capt. Dawid Janowicz-Czaiński started forming a Tatar cavalry regiment fighting alongside the Polish Army. This unit transformed into a squadron after the war, continued the traditions of Tatar military formations of the Polish-Lithuanian Commonwealth and became one of the most notable achievements of the Polish Tatar community in the 20th century. With the restoration of Polish independence, the Tatar community of Poland numbered around 6,000 people (according to the 1931 national census), mostly inhabiting the regions of Wilno, Nowogródek and Białystok Voivodeships. A large community of the Lipka Tatars remained outside of Polish borders, mostly in Lithuania and Belarus (especially in Minsk, the capital of the Belarusian SSR). Although small, the Tatar community formed one of the most vibrant national minorities of Poland. The Muslim Religious Association (est. 1917) focused on preserving the Muslim faith and religious beliefs. At the same time the Cultural and Educational Association of Polish Tatars worked on the preservation and strengthening of Tatar culture and traditions. In 1929 a Tatar National Museum was created in Wilno and in 1931 a Tatar National Archive was formed. All the Muslim people drafted into the army were sent to the Tatar Cavalry Squadron of the 13th Cavalry Regiment, which was allowed to use its own uniforms and banners. The Army Oath for Muslim soldiers was different from the one taken from soldiers of other denominations and was sworn in presence of Ali Ismail Woronowicz, the Chief Imam of the Polish Army.

== Post-WWII ==
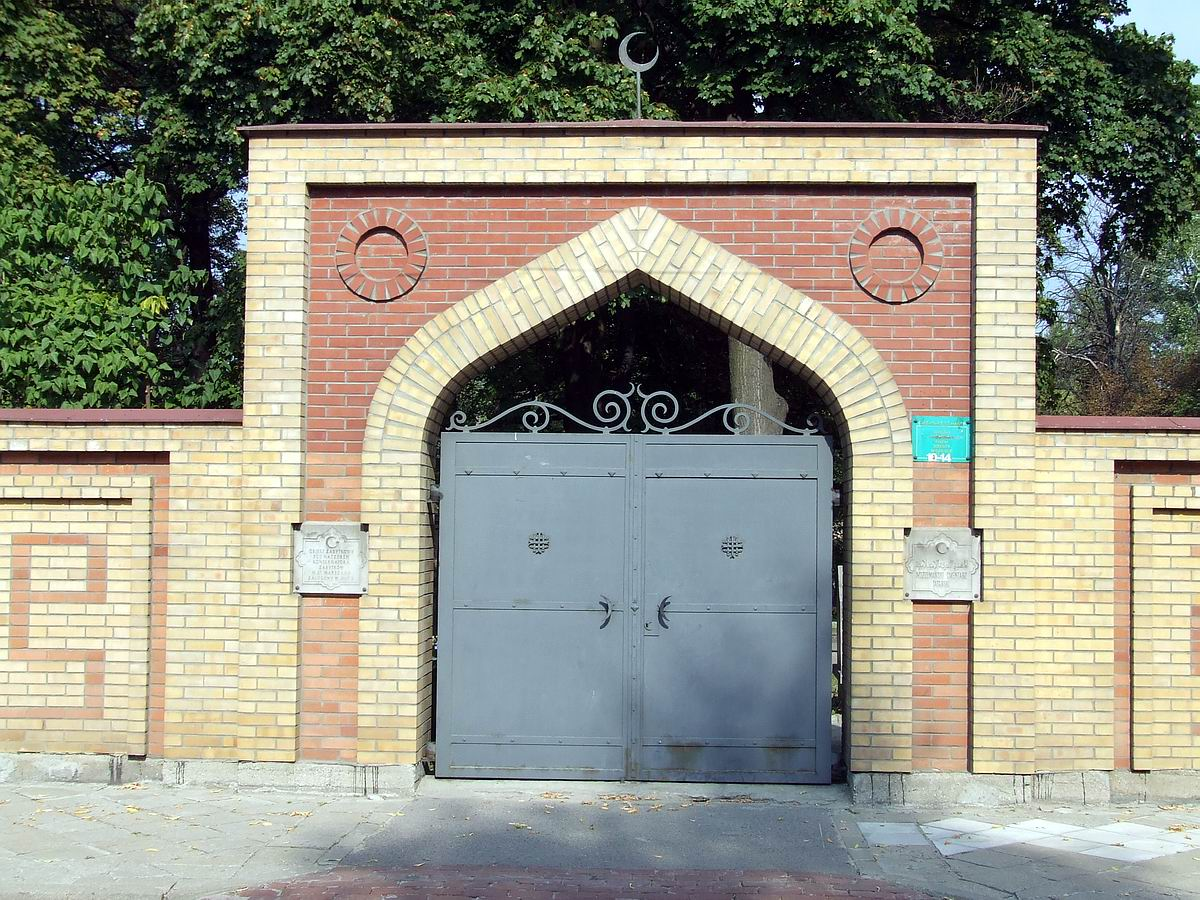
Muslim Tatar Cemetery in Warsaw

Apart from the traditional Tatar communities, since the 1960s Poland has also been home to a small immigrant Muslim community.

In the 1960’s and 1970’s Poland attracted a number of immigrants from many socialist-friendly Arabic-speaking Muslim states of the Middle East and North Africa. Some of them decided to stay in Poland. In the late 1980s this community became more active and better organized. They have built mosques and praying houses in Warsaw, Białystok, Gdańsk (built by the Tatar community), Wrocław, Lublin and Poznań. There are also praying rooms in Bydgoszcz, Kraków, Łódź, Olsztyn, Katowice and Opole.

Since the overthrow of the communist Polish People’s Republic in 1989, other Muslim immigrants have come to Poland. Relatively prominent groups are Turks and fellow ethnic-Slavic Muslims from the former Yugoslavia. There are also smaller groups of immigrants from Bangladesh, Afghanistan, and from other countries, as well as a refugee community coming from Chechnya.

The Polish Shia minority includes foreign students, migrants, and embassy staff, mainly from countries such as Iraq, Iran, Bahrain, Lebanon, along with native converts to Islam. Currently, Shi'ites in the country do not have their own freestanding mosque, but they do meet for weekly Friday prayer and major Islamic holidays.

The 2002 census showed only 447 people declaring Tatar nationality. According to the 2011 census, there are 1,916 Tatars in Poland (including 1,251 people who declared composite national-ethnic identity, e.g. identify as both Polish and Tatar). In recent years, increasing oppression from Alexander Lukashenko's authoritarian Government in Belarus and economic hardships has prompted a larger number of Lipka Tatars to come to Poland.

In November 2010, a monument to Poland's Islamic leader Dariusz Jagiełło was unveiled in the port city of Gdańsk at a ceremony attended by President Bronislaw Komorowski, as well as Tatar representatives from across Poland and abroad. The monument is a symbol of the important role of Tatars in Polish history. The monument is the first of its kind to be erected in Europe.

Tatars shed their blood in all national independence uprisings. Their blood seeped into the foundations of the reborn Polish Republic

— President of Poland Bronisław Komorowski at the unveiling of the monument in Gdańsk.

The exact number of Muslims living in Poland remains unknown as the last all-national census held by the Central Statistical Office in 2011 did not ask for religion.

=== Tatar–Salafi relations ===
There's an ongoing conflict between Polish native Sunni Muslim Lipka Tatars, who have a unique approach towards Islam and have been living in Poland for 600 years, and an increasingly vocal group of mainly foreign-born and foreign-sponsored, but also native-born convert, group of Sunni Muslims who adhere to the Salafi movement. The conflict divides country's Sunni Muslims and causes bureaucratic confusion, as both sides lay claim to representation of country's Sunni Muslims. The "native born" Sunni Muslims (Lipka Tatars), run Muzułmański Związek Religijny w Rzeczypospolitej Polskiej (Muslim Religious Union in the Polish Republic), and "foreign born" Sunni Muslims run Liga Muzułmańska w Rzeczypospolitej Polskiej (Muslim League in the Polish Republic). The latter is mainly based upon foreigners living in the country, such as Arabs, Bengalis, Chechens etc. Liga Muzułmańska is also a branch of a worldwide Muslim Brotherhood organization.

=== Islamophobia ===
Despite the fact that Muslims in Poland constitute less than 0.1% of the total population, stereotypes, verbal, violent, and physical displays of anti-Islam are widespread and, mostly, socially acceptable. Vandalism and attacks on the mosques are reported, and women (especially converts) who cover themselves are seen as "traitors" to their own culture.

From January 1, 2013, Poland's Muslims and Jews were both affected by a European Union ban on ritual slaughter after lawmakers deemed halal and kosher practices incompatible with animal rights legislation, specifically the Animal Protection Law of 1997. In December 2014, the Constitutional Tribunal ruled the ban unconstitutional on the grounds that it violated freedom of religion guaranteed by the Polish laws and constitution. Both ways of slaughtering animals were illegal in the country between January 1, 2013 and December, 2014, almost two years, and still is a controversial topic because of the concern of animal cruelty by those practices.

In May, 2016, shortly before the World Youth Day 2016, police in Kraków asked foreigners, mainly among the Muslim community, in the city if they “knew any terrorists". The Polish Ombudsman's office released statement that such actions are offensive and unacceptable.

=== Perception ===
Attitudes in Poland toward Islam (2015 CBOS poll)
Statement	Strongly agreed	Agreed (Total agreed)	Disagreed (Total disagreed)	Strongly disagreed	Hard to say
Muslims are intolerant of customs and values other than their own.	26%	38% (64%)	10% (12%)	2%	24%
Muslims living in Western European countries generally do not acquire customs and values that are characteristic for the majority of the population of that country.	25%	38% (63%)	12% (14%)	2%	23%
Islam encourages violence more than other religions.	25%	32% (57%)	14% (19%)	5%	24%
Muslims generally accept using violence against followers of different religions.	20%	31% (51%)	18% (24%)	6%	25%
A majority of Muslims condemn terrorist attacks carried out by Muslim fundamentalists.	12%	38% (50%)	16% (21%)	5%	29%
Poverty and poor education contribute more to fundamentalism and terrorism than the religious rules of Islam.	19%	30% (49%)	21% (28%)	7%	23%
Muslims rightly feel offended and protest against the satirical presentation of their faith.	14%	30% (44%)	24% (35%)	11%	21%
A majority of Muslims does not have a hostile attitude to followers of other religions.	7%	32% (39%)	23% (31%)	8%	30%

== Notable Muslims ==
- Tomasz Miśkiewicz, mufti of the Polish Muslim Religious Union
- Józef Bem, engineer and general, an Ottoman pasha and a national hero of Poland and Hungary, and a figure intertwined with other European patriotic movements
- Selim Chazbijewicz, political scientist and writer
- Osman Achmatowicz, academic and chemist
- Aleksander Jeljaszewicz, unit commander in the Polish army
- Jakub Szynkiewicz, religious scholar and writer
- Veli Bek Jedigar, commander in the Polish army
- Jahangir bey Kazimbeyli, Polish army officer
- Israfil Israfilov, Polish army officer
- Mamed Khalidov, Russian-born Polish mixed martial artist

== See also ==
- Religion in Poland
- Mosques:
  - Bohoniki Mosque
  - Kruszyniany Mosque
- History of Jews in Poland
- Turks in Poland
- Lipka Tatars
