= New York Mosque =

New York Mosque may refer to:

- Park51, a planned Islamic mosque and cultural center to be located on Park Place.
- Islamic Cultural Center of New York, on Third Avenue.
- Powers Street Mosque
- Masjid Malcolm Shabazz

== See also ==
- List of mosques in the United States, which includes other mosques in New York State.
