= 13th Wilno Uhlan Regiment =

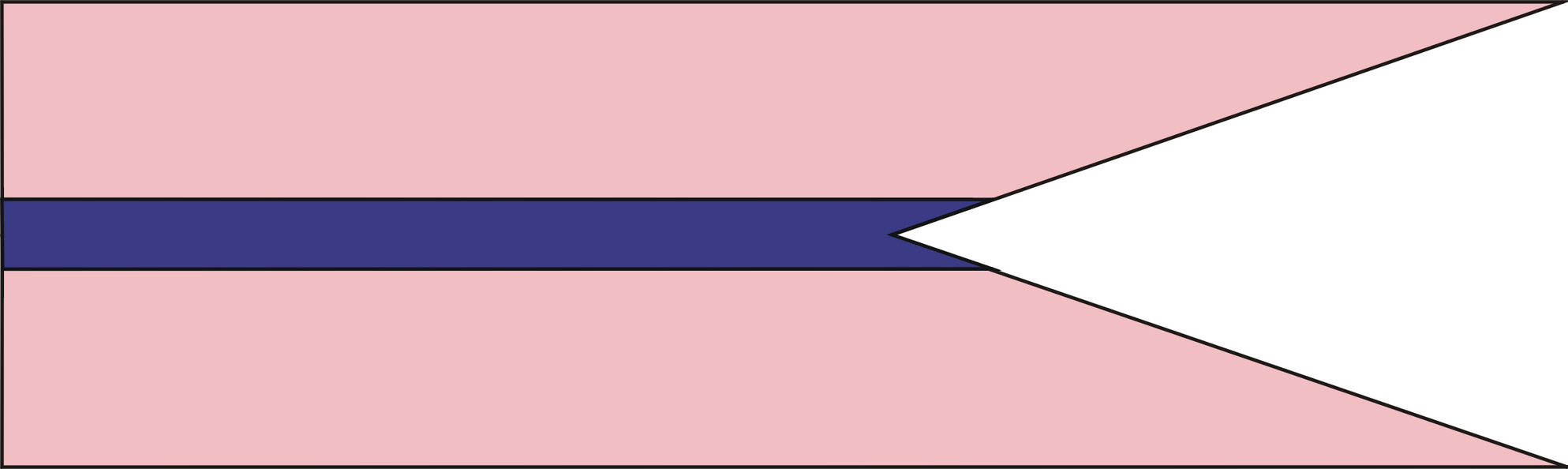
- 13th Wilno Uhlan Regiment
- Country: Poland
- Branch: Polish Army
- Type: Cavalry
- Size: Regiment
- Engagements: Polish–Soviet War; World War II; Raid on Jodele and Kiele

The 13th Wilno Uhlan Regiment (Polish: 13 Pułk Ułanów Wileńskich) was a unit of the Polish army during the interwar period and the Polish Defence War of 1939.

== Origins ==
The ancestral units to the regiment were created mainly as means of defending the Polish interest and the interest of the ethnic Poles living in Kresy at the end of World War I. Russians, Poles, Ukrainians, Lithuanians, Belarusians, and even Anarchists competed for the sovereignty over the area.

== Formation ==
The 13th Regiment was formed out of the cavalry units of the Lithuanian and Belarusian Self-Defence on December 27, 1918, on the estate of a Mr. Pośpieszek. On December 28, the regiment was moved to the garrison at Vilnius and was stationed in the barracks in the Antokol district. Władysław Dąbrowski, nom-de-guerre 'Dąb', lit. 'Oak', was the regiment's first commander. The regiment was the first in newly independent Poland, and was originally called the 1st Regiment of Wilno Uhlans. It became officially part of the Polish Armed Forces in June 1919, receiving its name and number.

The regiment was nationally famous because its commander, Major Władysław Dąbrowski, was a Zagończyk. In the official Polish Army documents, the phrase "Wilenskich" ("of Vilnius") was omitted; the official name was the 13th Regiment. In spite of this, the officers, soldiers and public persisted in calling it the "13th Wilno Regiment".

=== Lipka Tatar Tradition ===
Since the joining, the regiment had been following dual tradition of the afore-mentioned Lithuanian and Belarusian Self-Defence and of the 7th Lithuanian Tatar Regiment, which used to be stationed in Janów, the same place where over century later, the 13th Regiment fought its very first battle.

== Polish-Soviet War ==
The 13th Regiment participated in the Polish–Soviet War of 1919–1920 and became known for many flanking manoeuvres and raids behind Soviet lines. It protected the retreat of General Żeligowski's troops. On 25 February 1920, while it was stationed in Vilnius, the regiment mutinied, because it refused to fight against Lithuanians.

On June 29, 1919, in Vilnius, General Edward Rydz-Śmigły handed over the regiment's new banner to a small delegation from a combat area. After a failed attempt at seizing territory in Ukraine beyond Kiev, many soldiers from the disbanded Tatar Uhlan Regiment, (named after Colonel Mustafa Achmatowicz, a renowned eighteenth-century Lithuanian Tatar cavalryman), joined the "Wilno Regiment".

== Interwar period ==
In late 1921, the regiment patrolled the Polish border with Lithuania and was stationed for a brief period in Głębokie, at present Hlybokaye in Belarus. The regiment was moved to Nowa Wilejka near Vilnius in 1922, where it stayed until the Invasion of Poland in 1939.

In 1936, a Tatar unit was created within the 13th Regiment of Wilno Uhlans. By the order of the Polish Minister of Defence, issued on June 9, a troop within the regiment was renamed the 1st Tatar Squadron, to which all new recruits of Tatar ethnicity were directed. Captain Michał Bohdanowicz was the original commander. The unit was led for a short time by Captain Bazyli Marcisz and podpułkownik Jan Tarnowski. Captain Aleksander Jeljaszewicz became its last commander from November 25, 1938. During the Regiment's Holiday on July 25, 1937, the squadron (or mounted infantry battalion) received a buńczuk made according to the old Tatar traditions and funded by the entire Tatar community of Poland. During the symbolic ceremony of the burial of the heart of Marshal Józef Piłsudski in the Rasos cemetery in Vilnius, a detail from the 1st Tatar Squadron fired a three-volley salute.

=== Banners and markings ===
The regiment's lances initially bore pennons, but after 1936 these were only issued by personal request, when all cavalry units were transformed into mounted infantry units and were in the process of becoming fully mechanized divisions. However, progress was slow, only two fully mechanized units fought in the Invasion of Poland in 1939 besides armoured units, heavy artillery units, AA artillery units, Polish Air Force's ground units, and most of the tabors. Uniforms were adorned with miniature banners, pink in colour, with a slim cornflower-coloured stripe in the middle. Each trooper's rogatywka (hat) was adorned with a pink stripe running around the crown. The 1st Tatar Squadron also wore on the small banners, a golden Crescent Moon and star. The regiment's holiday was July 25 (in memory of the Battle of Janow in 1920).

=== The Uhlans in command ===
- Major Władysław Dąbrowski (ur. 1891) (1918–1920)
- Colonel Eugeniusz Ślaski (1920)
- Colonel Mścisław Butkiewicz (1920–1922)
- Honorary Colonel Terencjusz O'Brien (1922)
- Colonel Tomasz Brzozowski (1922–1925)
- Colonel Aleksander Kunicki (1925–1927)
- Colonel (finished senior officers' school) Adam Korytowski (XI 1927 – III 1930)
- Lieutenant Colonel (finished senior officers' school) Czesław Chmielewski (1930–1937)
- Colonel Kazimierz Żelisławski (1937–1939)
- Lieutenant Colonel Józef Szostak (finished senior officers' school) (1939)

=== A selection of Uhlan Officers ===
- Lieutenant Ignacy Cieplak
- Lieutenant Jerzy Cydzik

== Invasion of Poland ==
In 1939, under the command of Lieutenant Colonel Józef Szostak, the 13th Regiment of Wilno Uhlans fought as a part of the Wileńska Cavalry Brigade under the command of Colonel Konstanty Drucki-Lubecki. Between September 2 and 5, the brigade took part in heavy fighting near Piotrków Trybunalski. On September 9 and 10, the brigade lost many men and much equipment while retreating across the Vistula river near Maciejowice. The brigade fought in Lubelszczyzna near the city of Lublin, before being crushed near Tomaszow Lubelski.

The largest remnant of the regiment became part of the Independent Operational Group Polesie under the command of Major General Franciszek Kleeberg.

== Home Army ==
Subdivisions of the 13th Regiment of Wilno Uhlans AK were recreated in 1944 in the Wilno District of the Home Army as a mounted infantry division in the Rūdninkai Forest, a mounted infantry battalion attached to the Home Army 3rd Wilno Brigade, a mounted infantry platoon attached to the Home Army 4th Wilno Brigade and a mounted infantry platoon operating within Kampinos Forest.

== See also ==
- Polish cavalry
- Lipka Tatars

=== Other non-Christian Polish Cavalry units ===
- Light Cavalry Regiment of Old law followers
- Colonel Berek Joselewicz

== Sources ==
- Pacevičius, Paulius (2014). "LIETUVOS KARIUOMENĖS DEZERTYRAI NEPRIKLAUSOMYBĖS KOVŲ IR VALSTYBINGUMO ĮTVIRTINIMO LAIKOTARPIU 1918–1923 M. [Chapter: DEZERTYRAI SVETIMŲ VALSTYBIŲ KARIUOMENĖSE, VEIKUSIOSE LIETUVOJE 1919–1920 M.]". Karo Archyvas (in Lithuanian). XXIX. Vilnius: GENEROLO JONO ŽEMAIČIO LIETUVOS KARO AKADEMIJA. ISSN 1392-6489.
- Lederer, György; Takacs, Ibolya (1990). "Among the Muslims of Poland". Central Asian Survey. 9 (2). Routledge: 119–131. doi:10.1080/02634939008400704. ISSN 0263-4937.
- Davies, Norman (2003). White Eagle, Red Star: The Polish-Soviet War 1919-20. Pimlico. ISBN 978-0712606943.
- Norris, Harry (2009). Islam in the Baltic: Europe's Early Muslim Community. Tauris Academic Studies. ISBN 978-1845115876.
- Nalborczyk, Agata S. (2016). "Poland". In Svanberg, Ingvar; Westerlund, David (eds.). Muslim Tatar Minorities in the Baltic Sea Region. Brill. ISBN 978-90-04-30880-0.
