= Aleksander Romanowicz =

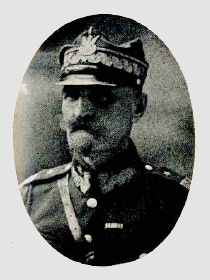
- Born: 1 April 1871
- Died: 14 November 1933 (aged 62)
- Military career
- Rank: General
- Conflicts: First World War; Polish–Soviet War

Aleksander Romanowicz was a general of cavalry in both Russian Imperial Army and Polish Army. Born on 1 April 1871, on his family estate Olekszyszki (near Lida), in 1890 he graduated from the Russian Army Cadet Corps in Polotsk, then entered the Officer’s School of Cavalry, becoming in 1892 a professional officer of the Russian Army. He was of Lithuanian Tatar origin.

At the beginning of World War I, he fought in Eastern Prussia. Then, together with his soldiers, he was moved to the area of Kalisz, and in 1916 was poisoned during a German gas attack. After recuperating, in 1917 he was promoted to General Major and moved to Finland.

In November 1918 Romanowicz joined the Polish Army and became commander of the Tatar Uhlan Regiment, later 7th Mounted Regiment. He participated in the Polish-Soviet War, after the conflict decided to quit the army. In mid-1921 he settled in his family estate and became president of the local Muslim community. Later Romanowicz moved to Wilno, where he died on 14 November 1933.
