= Aleksander Jeljaszewicz =

Polish major

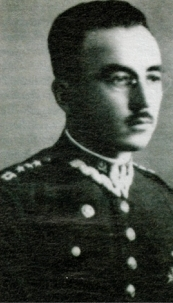
- Born: 22 March 1902; Vilna, Russian Empire
- Died: 18 August 1978 (aged 76); Gdańsk, Poland
- Military career
- Allegiance: Poland
- Branch: Polish Army
- Nickname: Sasza
- Conflicts: World War II

Aleksander Jeljaszewicz, known as "Sasza" (22 March 1902 – 18 August 1978) was a Major in the Polish Army. He was the commander of the last Tatar unit in the Polish military.

== Early life ==
An ethnic—Polish (Lipka) Tatar, Jeljaszewicz was born in Vilna, Russian Empire (now Vilnius, Lithuania), the son of Jan (John), a captain in the Russian Imperial Army. Between 1912 and 1919 he was a student at Corps of Cadets in Pskov, and later in Kyiv. Evacuated to Turkey and Yugoslavia, he finished officers' school as a cavalry officer in 1923. In 1924 and 1925, he was serving in the Serb border guards' unit, only to return to Poland in 1925.

== In the Polish Army ==
The same year, he joined the Polish military and was sent to the Cavalry Officers' School in Grudziądz. He became a professional (soldier) officer in 1928 in the "Zaniemieńskich" ("Beyond Niemen River") 4th Regiment of Uhlans in Vilnius garrison. In 1938, he was transferred to the 13th Regiment of Wilno Uhlans "Wileńskich" ("From Vilnius") in Nowa Wilejka (at present part of Vilnius), where he was the commander of the 1st Tatar Squadron (1 Szwadron Tatarski). The last mounted Tatar unit in the history of the Polish military. In 1939, he participated in the September Campaign.

== September Campaign ==
In the first days of September, the 13th Regiment of Wilno Uhlans "Wileńskich" fought near Piotrkow; next, it crossed the Vistula near Maciejowice. Near Maciejowice on the 9 or 10 September, the Tatar squadron executed the last charge against German infantry.

The charge has become a symbol of the closing of the chapter in the history of the Polish military: the end of the last Islamic/Tatar unit. Soon after, 13th Regiment of Wilno Uhlans was dispersed by the enemy during fighting near the village of Suchowola near Lublin. Jeljaszewicz together with the few of his men who have not been dispersed tried to reach the Romanian Bridgehead, but was stopped, and spent the rest of the war in a German oflag.

== After war ==
He came back to Poland and lived in Gdańsk. He worked in PZU. He was an active member of the local Tatar community paving the way for people like Professor Selim Chazbijewicz ("Mirza Selim Juszenski--Chazbijewicz" last part the clan name or the coat—of—arms' name), the main historian of the Polish Tatars. He died in Gdańsk, and was buried in the Islamic Tatar Cemetery in Warsaw.

== Other Polish non-Christian World War Two soldiers ==
- Dawid Moryc Apfelbaum
- Baruch Steinberg
- Mieczyslaw Norwid-Neugebauer

== See also ==
- Polish cavalry charges and propaganda
- Polish cavalry brigade order of battle in 1939
- Polish Tatars
- People from Gdansk
- List of Vilnius-related people
