= Jakub Szynkiewicz =

Polish mufti

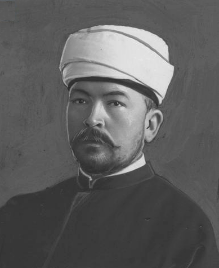
Mufti Jakub Szynkiewicz

Jakub Szynkiewicz (16 April 1884 – 1 November 1966) was a Doctor of Philosophy as well as Oriental Studies, chosen as the first mufti of the newly independent Poland in 1925.

== Biography ==
Jakub Szynkiewicz was born to a Tatar family on 16 April 1884 in Lyakhavichy (Lachowicze) in the Minsk Governorate of the Russian Empire (from 1921 to 1939 part of Poland, today western Belarus). He was son of Sulejman and Fatma. He had a brother, Mustafa Szynkiewicz, a Chairman of Związek Tatarów Litewskich (en. Society of Lithuanian Tatars), and sister Amina.

In 1904 he graduated from the Minsk High School (Męska Szkoła Realna), after which he first studied engineering sciences, but later in 1907 he decided to study Orientalism in St. Petersburg. In 1925 he earned a doctorate in philosophy at the University of Berlin with a dissertation in German language. On 28 October that year he was elected Mufti of all Muslims in Poland. Its headquarters was located in Vilnius.

He translated a number of verses from the Quran from Arabic into Polish, published in 1935 under the title Wersety z Koranu. During his leadership he created contacts with much of the outside Muslim World with India, Palestine, Egypt and others. Mufti Szynkiewicz also attended the Cairo caliphate congress in 1926. During the European Muslim Congress in 1935, he was called "one of the most articulate participants". In a dramatic episode at the congress, Mufti Szynkiewicz demanded that the director of the Istituto Superiore Orientale di Napoli, Count Bernardo Barbiellini Amidei, pronounce the profession of faith (shahada) three times before congress participants when the count appeared before the congress to ask that it formally recognize his adherence to Islam. Mufti Szynkiewicz also oversaw the formal regulation of the newly independent Polish state dealing with the legal status of Polish Muslims in 1936. He was central in the plans to build a mosque in Warsaw that was interrupted by the Nazi invasion of Poland in 1939.

== World War II and exile ==
During World War II he served as Mufti fuer die besetzten Ostgebiete. In late 1944 he left and declined to return to Communist Poland. After the war he resettled in Egypt but moved to the United States following the pro-Soviet Nasser coup of 1952. He died in Waterbury, Connecticut, on 1 November 1966.
