= Powers Street Mosque =

Sunni mosque in New York, New York, United States

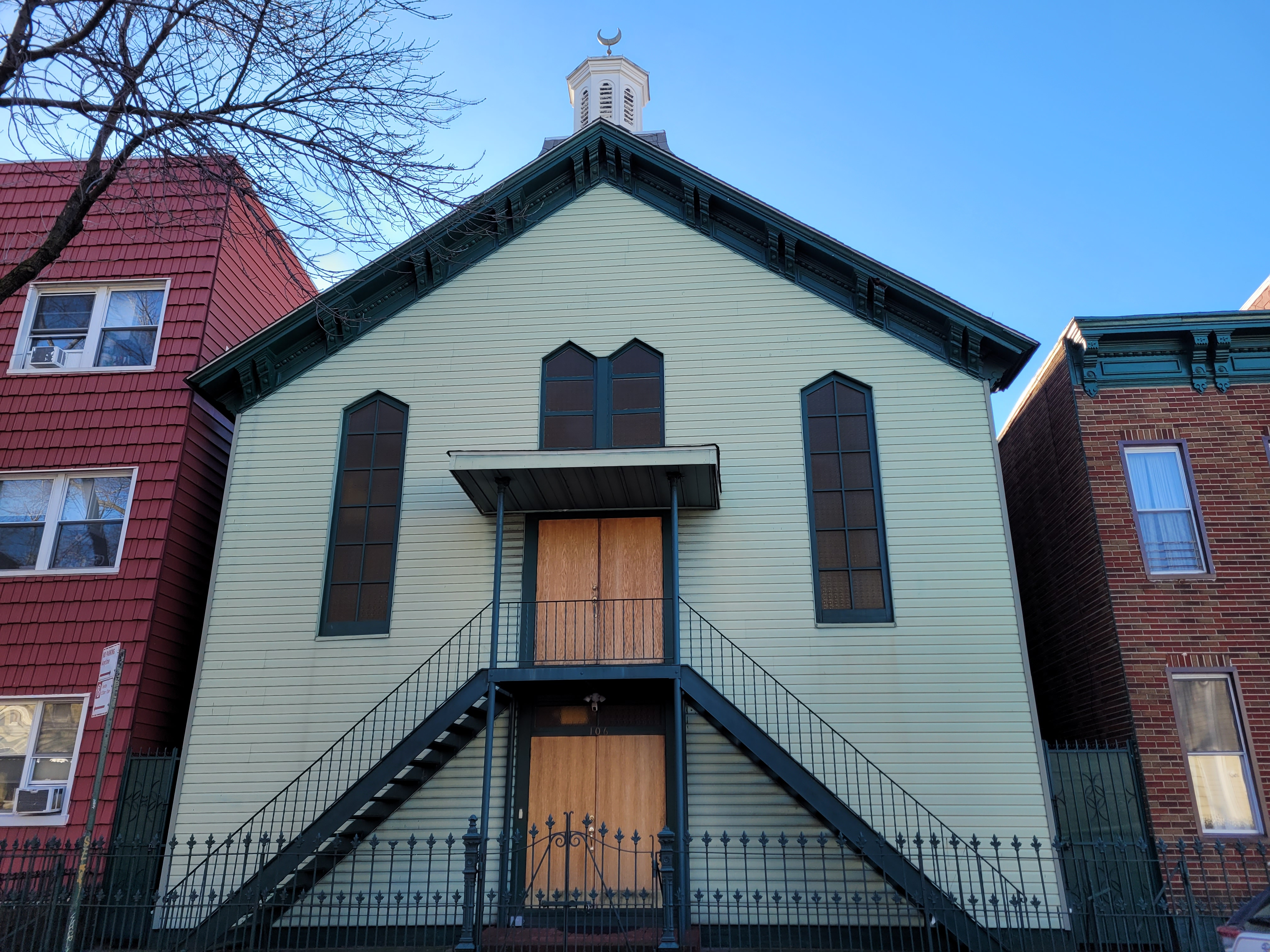

- Location within New York City

Religion
- Affiliation: Islam

Location
- Location: 104 Powers Street Brooklyn, New York, United States
- Coordinates: 40°42′43″N 73°56′48″W

The Powers Street Mosque in Brooklyn, New York City is one of the oldest mosques in the United States. It was founded by a small group of Lipka Tatars from the Białystok region of Poland. This was the first Muslim organization in New York State and the first official mosque for New York City's Muslim population.

== History ==
=== Beginnings ===
Small-scale Muslim immigration to the United States began in 1840, with the arrival of Arabs and Turks, and lasted until World War I. Most of the immigrants, from Arab areas of the Ottoman Empire, came with the purpose of making money and returning to their homeland. Some of these immigrants settled in the United States permanently. Nonetheless, the population of Muslims in the United States was small in the first half of the 20th century, and many of these first immigrants assimilated and did not create any lasting Muslim religious institutions.

Lipka Tatars have been a fixture of Poland's ethnic landscape since the 14th century, with many gaining the privileges of nobility in the Polish–Lithuanian Commonwealth. Lipka Tatars settlements were located in northeast Poland, Belarus, Lithuania, south-east Latvia and Ukraine, with about 10,000 to 15,000 Lipka Tatars still living in Poland, Belarus, and Lithuania. Lipka Tatars in these communities followed their Polish neighbors in immigrating to the United States, and subsequently settled close to the Polish enclave of Greenpoint, Brooklyn. This community formally organized themselves as the American Mohammedan Society in 1907.

=== 104 Powers Street ===
When the American Mohammedan Society bought 104 Powers Street in 1931 along with two adjacent lots, the organization became the first corporate body to purchase land in New York City with the express purpose of practicing Islam. An article in a 1935 issue of The Muslim World Journal describes 104 Powers Street as a three-story wooden building that is the “only real mosque which exists today in America." Time Magazine wrote about the mosque in a feature on Ramadan in its November 15 issue in 1937:

"Today the clean, shiny mosque looks like a Polish church, decorated in pink, yellow and blue, the Moslem star & crescent festooned with painted roses and daisies. This is natural since its swart, thick-accented Imam, Sam Rafilowich, son of an Imam in a Polish village, is a Polish Tartar, who arrived in the U. S. 29 years ago. Most of his habitual worshippers are also Tartars, descendants of Tamerlane's hordes who entered Russia 600 years ago."

The American Mohammedan Society is the fifth owner of the property, which has served as a church, a District Assembly Clubhouse for the Democratic Party, as well as a greenhouse. The structure was originally constructed as the Powers Street Methodist Episcopal Church, and the interior still resembles a Christian worship space today, with three short steps leading up to an altar on the first floor that the Tatars converted into a minbar. Congregants stand diagonally to pray and a makeshift partition separates the women’s prayer area from the men’s section; unlike conventional mosques that face the Kaaba in Mecca, 104 Powers Street is not a purpose-built mosque.

History, architecture, and community significance

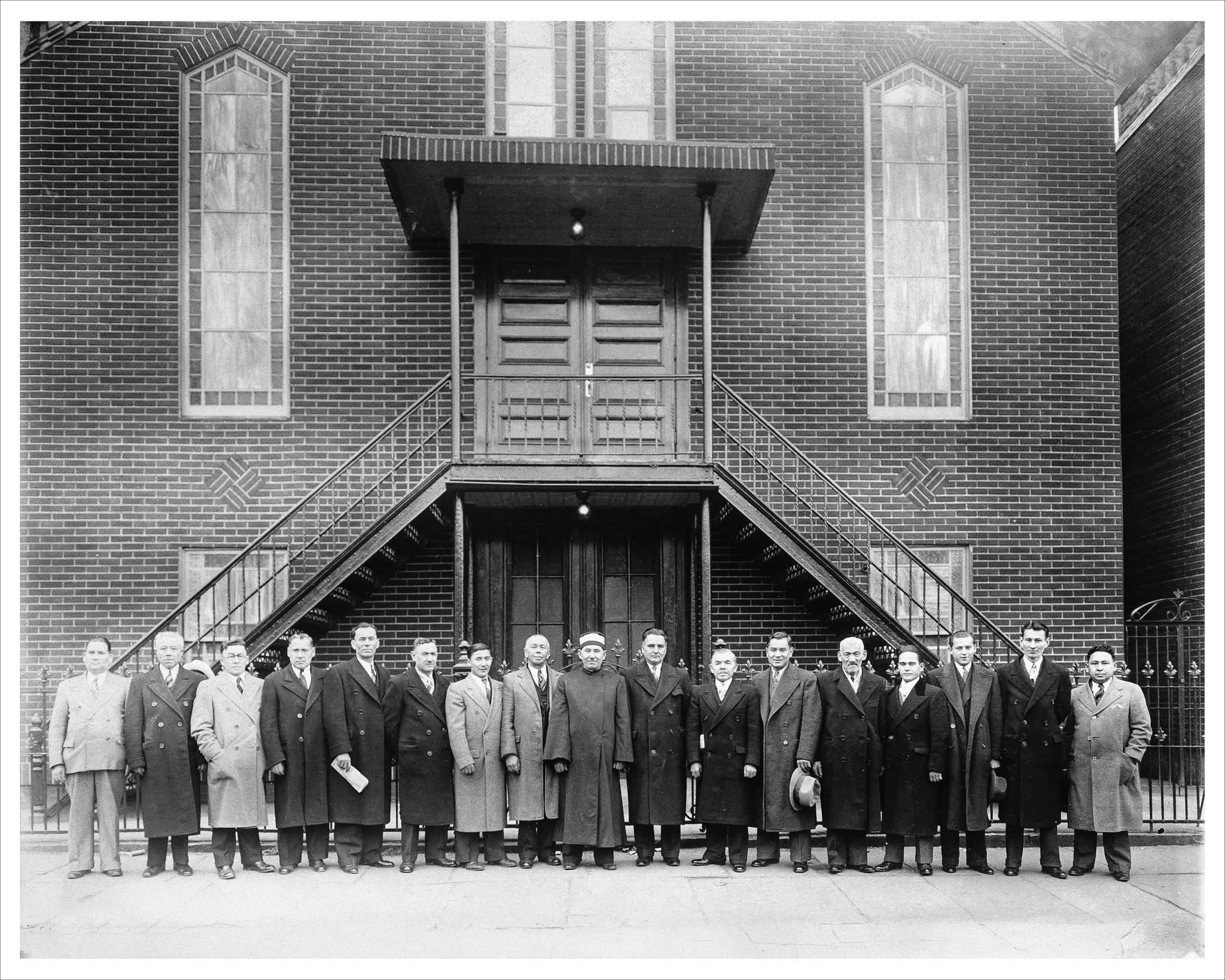
The mosque in 1934

Though the Powers Street Mosque is known for its early establishment in New York, researchers and community members have increasingly recognized its significance as a place where Lipka Tatar identity continues to thrive in NYC. Stories from descendants describe it as a place where community members can stay connected across space and time, sharing traditions, and keeping cultural customs alive . Because of the building's multi-purposes, the structure is the site of community events and milestones, which helps maintain a sense of belonging for the small community.

Once the American Mohammedan Society acquired the building, leaders of the mosque changed the interior to reflect elements of mosques from their homeland. Its wooden structure, modest scale, and interior layout mark this homage, making it stand out amongst later purpose-built mosques in America. Because of this scholars of this topic, view the site as significant not only for its religious role, but also for how it shows the ways a minority community adapted and ultimately made its mark on a new landscape .

Reporting in the last ten years has also drawn attention to the mosque's meaning today, garnering interest from younger Lipka Tatar descendants who view it as a physical connection to family heritage and immigrant narratives.

Interviews with congregants describe the site as a place where heritage and community still takes precedence, despite the fact that the building isn't regularly open for prayer. This has brought the mosque into discourse about Muslim American heritage, especially in relation to communities that are underrepresented in the contexts of significant architecture in America.

These developments have led to Powers Street Mosque being viewed as a cultural landmark with significance beyond its founding community. The building now appears in studies about early Muslim settlements in New York, contributing to advocates' goal of broadening the public's knowledge of Muslim history and influence in America.

=== Present ===
The Lipka Tatar community in Brooklyn has shrunk dramatically since then. These days, the mosque usually only opens up for weddings and funerals, presided over by a part-time Imam of Bulgarian descent who lives on Long Island.
