= Mieczysław Norwid-Neugebauer =

Polish politician and lieutenant-general

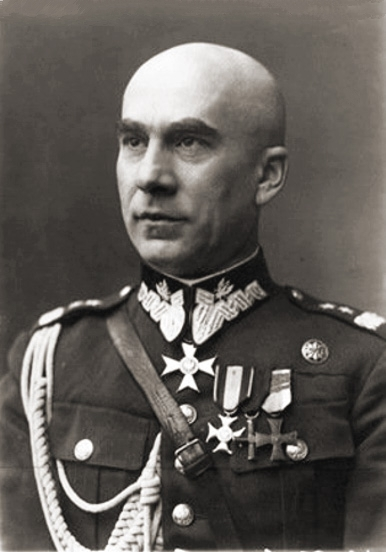
Gen. Norwid-Neugebauer.

Mieczysław Norwid-Neugebauer (15 February 1884 in Rzejowice, near Radomsko – 18 October 1954 in Toronto) was a minister in the interwar Polish government, and a lieutenant general in the Polish Army.

== Life ==
He moved to Galicia in 1906, where he attended Lwów Polytechnic. Before World War I, Norwid-Neugebauer was a member of various Polish patriotic organizations. From 1914 to 1917, he was an officer in the Polish Legions. He commanded the 6th Infantry Regiment, and even temporarily the 3rd Brigade.

After Poland regained independence in November 1918, he occupied various command positions within the Polish military: General: Head of Logistics, later on he was at the same time an Executive officer to the Polish Head of all the Armed Forces, and later, he was the Commanding Officer of the 4th General Command (the last two during the Polish-Soviet War). In 1919, he was promoted to a Brigade General, and in 1924, he was promoted to a Major General. Between 1921 and 1924, he was a commanding officer of the 28th Division of Infantry. Between 1924 and 1925, he was a commanding officer of the reserves in charge of conscription. In October, 1925, he was transferred to become a Minister of Defense as well as officially sent for the 3rd Level Course at Center of Higher Military Education (University). In December of the same year, he was nominated to be the 1st Officer of the Commander of the Administration of the Army.

He was the Commander of the Inspector General of the Polish Army in between 1926 and 1930 and stationed in Lviv, 1932-1935 stationed in Toruń, and in 1935-1939 stationed in Warsaw. During 1930 to 1932, he was Minister of Public Works in the cabinets of Walery Sławek and Aleksander Prystor. On 3 September 1939, he was nominated as the head of the Polish Military Mission to London—in London, put in charge of pleading with the Great Britain to fulfill her obligation as an ally of Poland. Norwid—Neugebauer's pleas, addressed to the British Government to start an air offensive as promised in May 1939, were unsuccessful; the British Government and RAF did not fulfill their promise in spite of his pleas (possibly because of the French government's fear of retaliatory nazi German bombing).

He resigned as head of the Polish Military Mission in January 1940. From November 1942 to 1947 he headed the administration of the Polish Armed Forces.

He published a book, Kampania Wrześniowa (The September Campaign), in London in 1941. An English translation came out in 1942.

== Honours and awards ==
- Silver Cross of the Virtuti Militari
- Commander's Cross with Star of the Order of Polonia Restituta, previously awarded Commander's Cross
- Cross of Independence
- Cross of Valour - four times
- Officer's "Parasol" badge
- Officer's Cross of the Legion of Honour (France)

== Sources ==
- Bethell, Nicholas (1972), The War Hitler Won: The Fall of Poland, 1939, United States: Holt, Rinehart and Winston, ISBN 0030013763
- Lerski, Jerzy Jan; Lerski, George J; Lerski, Halina T (1996), Historical Dictionary of Poland, 966-1945, Greenwood Publishing Group, ISBN 0313260079

== See also ==
- Aleksander Jeljaszewicz Commander of the Tatar / Islamic Squadron in 1939
- Berek Joselewicz, Polish—Jewish Colonel in the Polish Legions of Napoleon's armies
- Baruch Steinberg, Chief Rabbi of the Polish Armed Forces, murdered by the Soviet NKVD
- List of Poles
