= 7th Lithuanian Tatar Regiment =

7th Lithuanian Vanguard Regiment
- Active: 1792-?
- Country: Grand Duchy of Lithuania (May 1792), Targowica Confederation (Since October)
- Type: Cavalry
- Garrison/HQ: Ivanava (1792 Dec)

The 7th Lithuanian Tatar Regiment (Polish: 7 Pulk Tartarski Wielkiego Ksiestwa Litewskiego) was a military unit of the Grand Duchy of Lithuania. It was also known as the Tartar Regiment of Alexander Ulano.

== History ==
=== Formation ===
The Regiment was formed in May 1792.

=== Service ===
The regiment was pressed into the service of the Targowica Confederation in October 1792. The regiment was stationed in Ivanava (1792 Dec).

== Commanders ==
The unit was commanded of the legendary Colonel Aleksander Mustafa Ułan.

== Uniforms ==
All officers and men had red czapkas, which themselves had a black lambswool band in addition to a white plume. They all had one left-hand white epaulette. The red saddle cloth had white edging.

== Sources ==
- Norris, Harry (2009). Islam in the Baltic: Europe's Early Muslim Community. Tauris Academic Studies. ISBN 978-1845115876.
- Rospond, Vincent W. (2013). "Tartar Regiment of Alexander Ulano - a.k.a. 7th Regiment of Tartars of the Grand Duchy of Lithuania (7 Pulk Tartarski Wielkiego Ksiestwa Litewskiego)". Commonwealth Armies of the Partitions 1770 - 1794. Great Britain: Osprey Publishing. ISBN 978-1-84908855-8.
