= Lipka Tatars =

Tatar ethnic group in Eastern Europe

Polish: Tatarzy polscy; Lithuanian: Lietuvos totoriai; Belarusian: Літоўскія татары
- One of the variations of the flag of Lipka Tatars, almost resembling the flag of Golden Horde but with smaller and reversed tamga located on the upper hoist side.

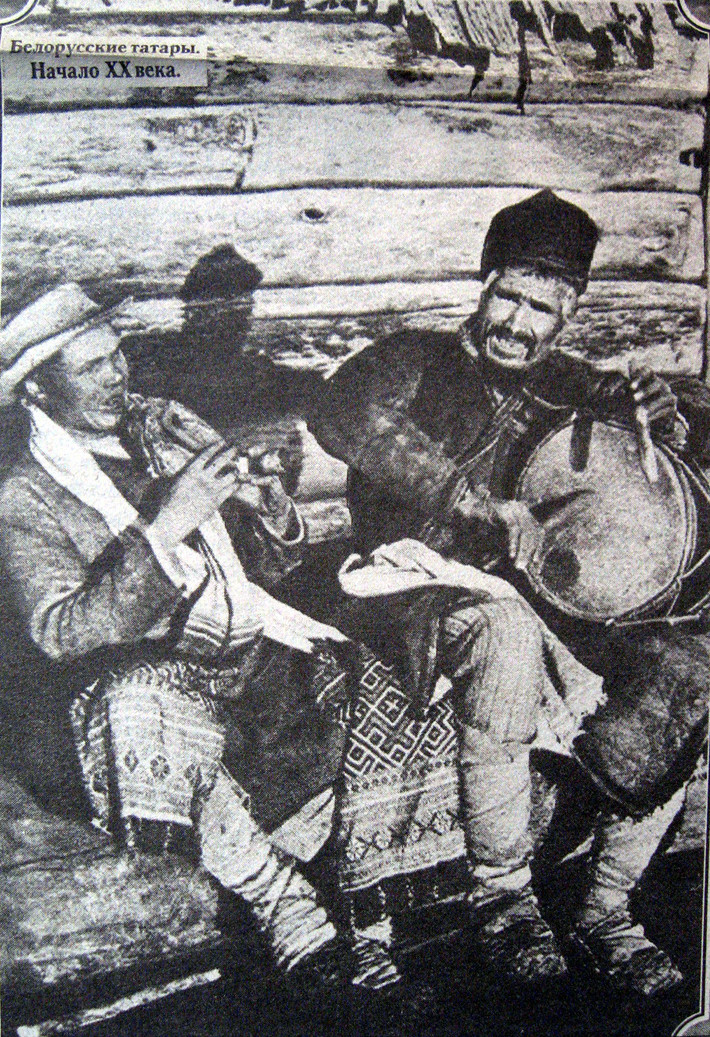
- Belarusian Tatars

Total population
- 10,000–15,000

Regions with significant populations
- Belarus: 8,445 (2019 census)
- Lithuania: 2,142 (2021 census) – 3,200
- Poland: 1,916 (2011 census)

Languages
- Tatar, Belarusian, Lithuanian, Polish, Russian

Religion
- Sunni Islam

Related ethnic groups
- Crimean Tatars, Volga Tatars, Siberian Tatars, Dobrujan Tatars (Tatars of Romania and Tatars in Bulgaria), Nogais

The Lipka Tatars (Note: The term Lipka refers to Lithuania; they are otherwise known as Lipkas or Lithuanian Tatars; later referred to as Polish Tatars, Polish–Lithuanian Tatars, Belarusian Tatars, Lipkowie, Lipcani, and Muślimi.) are a Turkic ethnic group and minority in Belarus, Lithuania and Poland who originally settled in the Grand Duchy of Lithuania at the beginning of the 14th century.

The first Tatar settlers tried to preserve their Pagan tradition and sought asylum amongst the Baltic pagans. Towards the end of the 14th century, another wave of Tatars—this time, Islamized Turkic populations—were invited into the Grand Duchy by Vytautas the Great. These Tatars first settled in Lithuania proper around Vilnius, Trakai, Hrodna and Kaunas, later spreading to other parts of the Grand Duchy that later became part of the Polish–Lithuanian Commonwealth. These areas comprise parts of present-day Belarus, Lithuania, and Poland. From the very beginning of their settlement in Lithuania they were known as the Lipka Tatars. From the Battle of Grunwald onwards, the Lipka Tatar light cavalry regiments participated in every significant military campaign of Lithuania and Poland.

The Lipka Tatars can be traced back to the successor states of the Golden Horde, the Crimean Khanate, and Kazan Khanate. They initially served as a noble military caste but later they became urban-dwellers known for their crafts, horses, and gardening skills. Throughout centuries they resisted assimilation and kept their traditional lifestyle. While they remained very attached to their religion, over time they lost their original Tatar language, from the Kipchak group of Turkic languages, and for the most part adopted Belarusian, Lithuanian, and Polish. There are still small groups of Lipka Tatars living in Belarus, Lithuania, and Poland, as well as their diaspora communities in the United States.

== Name ==
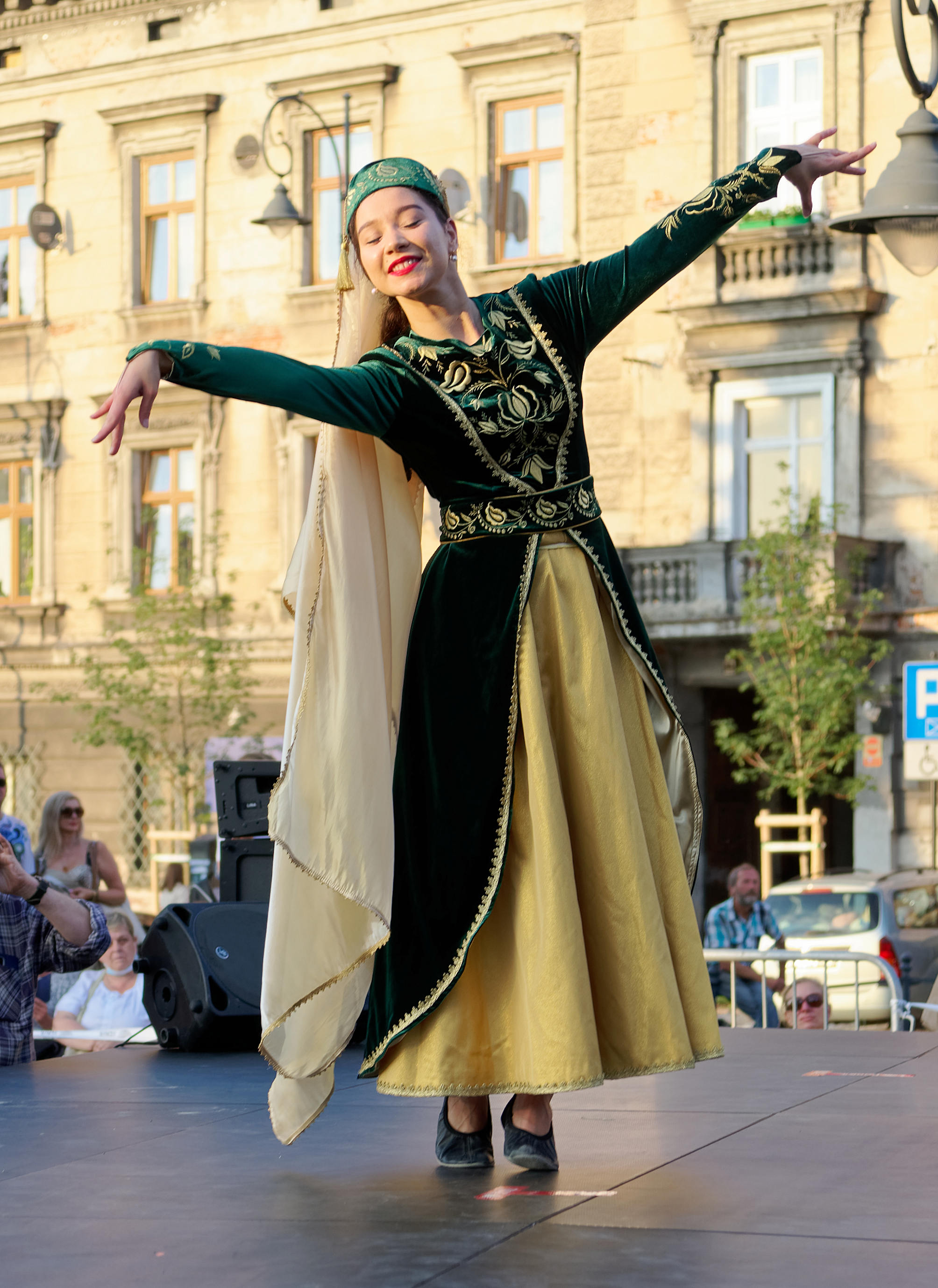
Tatar dance

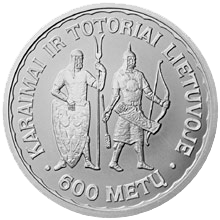
Litas commemorative coin for the 600th anniversary of Karaims and Tatars in Lithuania (1397–1997)

The name Lipka is derived from the old Crimean Tatar name of Lithuania. The record of the name Lipka in Oriental sources suggests an original Libķa/Lipķa, from which the Polish derivative Lipka was formed, with possible contamination from contact with the Polish lipka "small lime-tree"; this etymology was suggested by the Tatar author S. Tuhan-Baranowski. A less frequent Polish form, Łubka, is corroborated in Łubka/Łupka, the Crimean Tatar name of the Lipkas up to the end of the 19th century. The Crimean Tatar term Lipka Tatarłar meaning Lithuanian Tatars, later started to be used by the Polish–Lithuanian Tatars to describe themselves.

Over time, the lower and middle Lipka Tatar nobles adopted the Ruthenian language then later the Belarusian language as their native language. However, they used the Arabic alphabet to write in Belarusian until the 1930s. The upper nobility of Lipka Tatars spoke Polish.

Diplomatic correspondence between the Crimean Khanate and Poland from the early 16th century refers to Poland and Lithuania as the "land of the Poles and the Lipkas". By the 17th century the term Lipka Tatar began to appear in the official documents of the Polish–Lithuanian Commonwealth.

== History ==
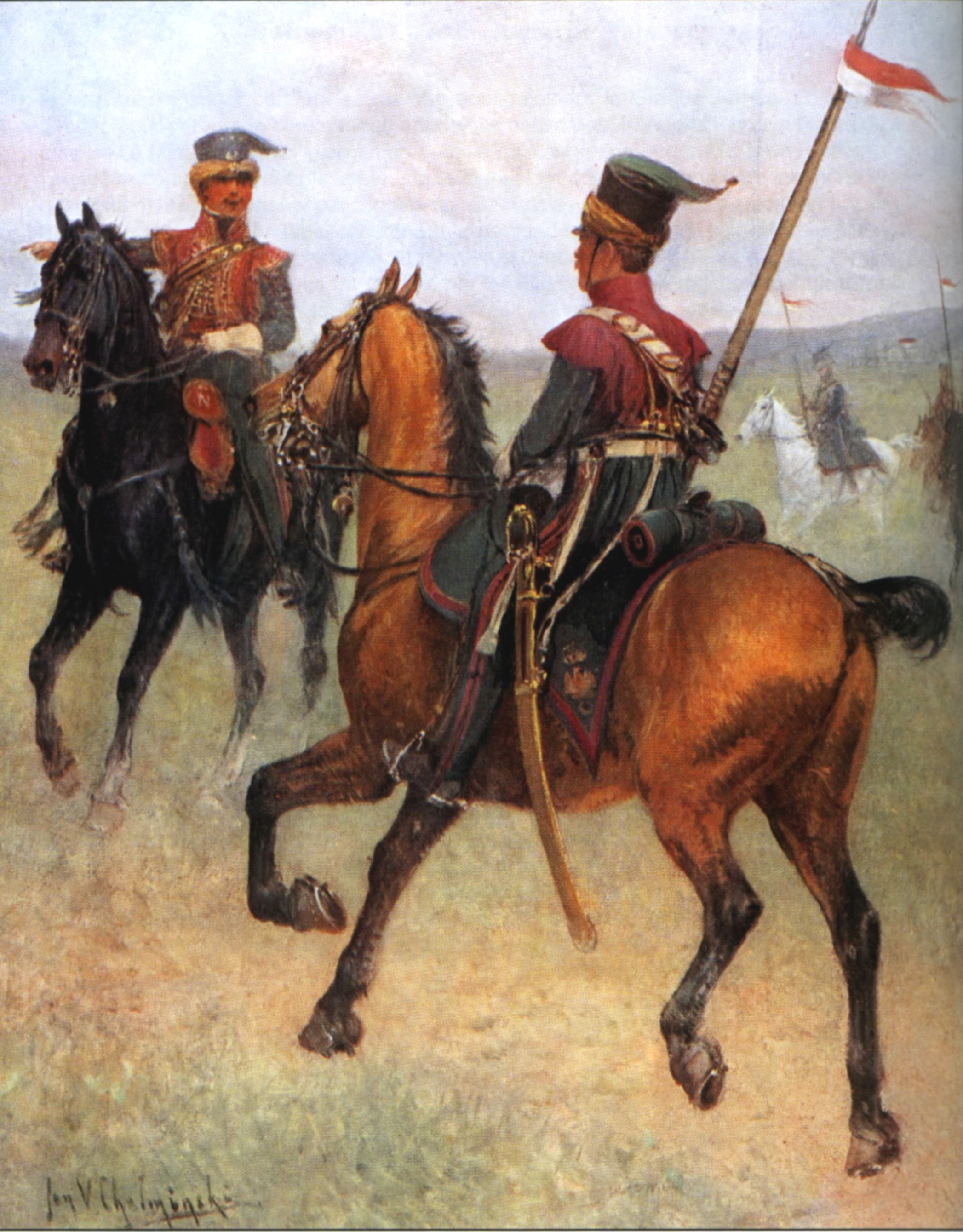
Lithuanian Tatars in the Napoleonic Army.

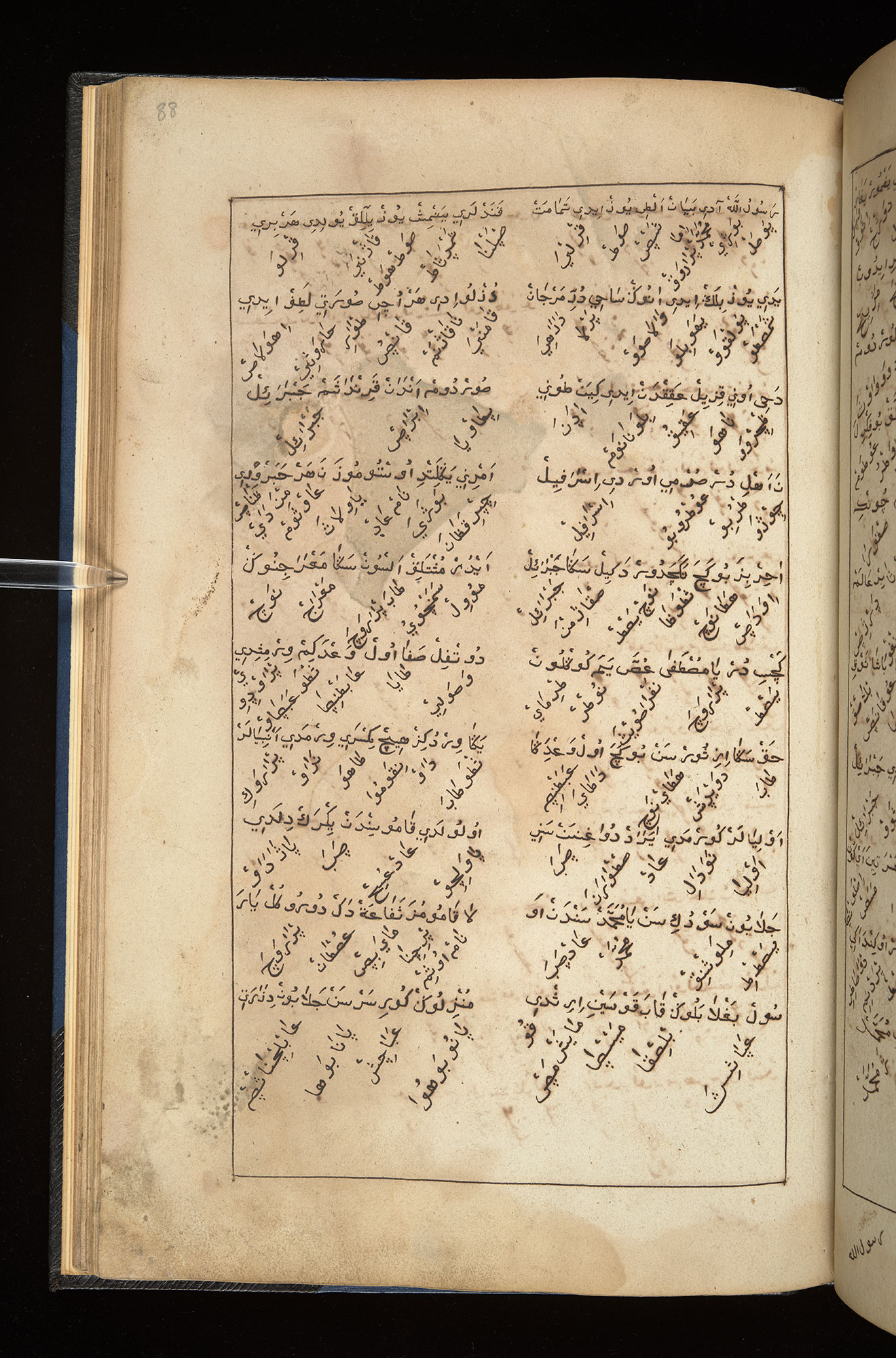
Page from the Dastan-ı Miraç (British Library, London), a miscellany of religious works written in a Slavic language using the Arabic script, probably copied in the late 18th–early 19th century in western Belarus. Although Lipka Tatars are a Turkic people, they have been using Belarusian, Lithuanian, and Polish as their means of daily communication for centuries. The Slavic translation is written in modified Arabic characters with special letters to indicate sounds that do not exist in Arabic or Turkic.

The migration of Tatars into the lands of the Kingdom of Poland and the Grand Duchy of Lithuania from the territories of the Golden Horde began during the 14th century and lasted until the end of the 17th century. There was a subsequent wave of Tatar immigrants from Soviet Russia after the October Revolution of 1917, although these consisted mostly of political and national activists.

Lipka Tatars living in the Polish–Lithuanian Commonwealth had about 400 mosques serving them. According to the Risāle-yi Tatar-i Leh (trans: Message Concerning the Tatars of Poland, an account of the Lipka Tatars written for Suleiman the Magnificent by an anonymous Polish Muslim during a stay in Constantinople in 1557–1558 on his way to Mecca) there were 100 Lipka Tatar settlements with mosques in Poland. The largest communities existed in the cities of Lida, Navahrudak, and Iwye. There was a Lipka Tatar settlement in Vilnius, known as Totorių Lukiškės, Tatar quarter in Trakai and in Minsk, current capital of Belarus, known as Tatarskaya Slabada. Tatar communities also existed in Volhynia, Podolia and Galicia, as well as in the areas of Kyiv and Chernihiv. Their presence is proven by historical names of streets and city gates in Lutsk and Ostroh.

In the year 1672, the Tatar subjects rose up in open rebellion against the Commonwealth. This event was remembered as the Lipka rebellion. Thanks to the efforts of King John III Sobieski, who was held in great esteem by the Tatar soldiers, many of the Lipkas seeking asylum and service in the Ottoman army returned to his command and participated in the military struggles against the Ottoman Empire in the Great Turkish War up to the Treaty of Karlowitz in 1699, which ended the Ottoman expansion in Europe with their defeat.

Beginning in the late 18th and throughout the 19th century, the Lipkas became successively more and more Polonized. The upper and middle classes in particular adopted Polish language and customs, while the lower ranks became Ruthenized. At the same time, the Tatars held the Lithuanian Grand Duke Vytautas (Wattad in Tatar), who encouraged and supported their settlement in the late 14th and early 15th century, in great esteem, including him in many legends, prayers and their folklore. Muslim communities in parts of Volhynia existed until the early 20th century, and several local families of Tatar origin were ennobled. The last mullah serving in the area was exiled to Siberia in 1931, and since then most of Lipka Tatar descendants in modern Ukraine have been assimilated.

Throughout the 20th and since the 21st century, most Tatars no longer view religious identity as being as important as it once was, and the religious and linguistic subgroups have intermingled considerably; for example, the Tatar women in Poland do not practice veiling (wearing headscarf/hijab) or view it as a mandatory religious obligation.

=== Timeline ===
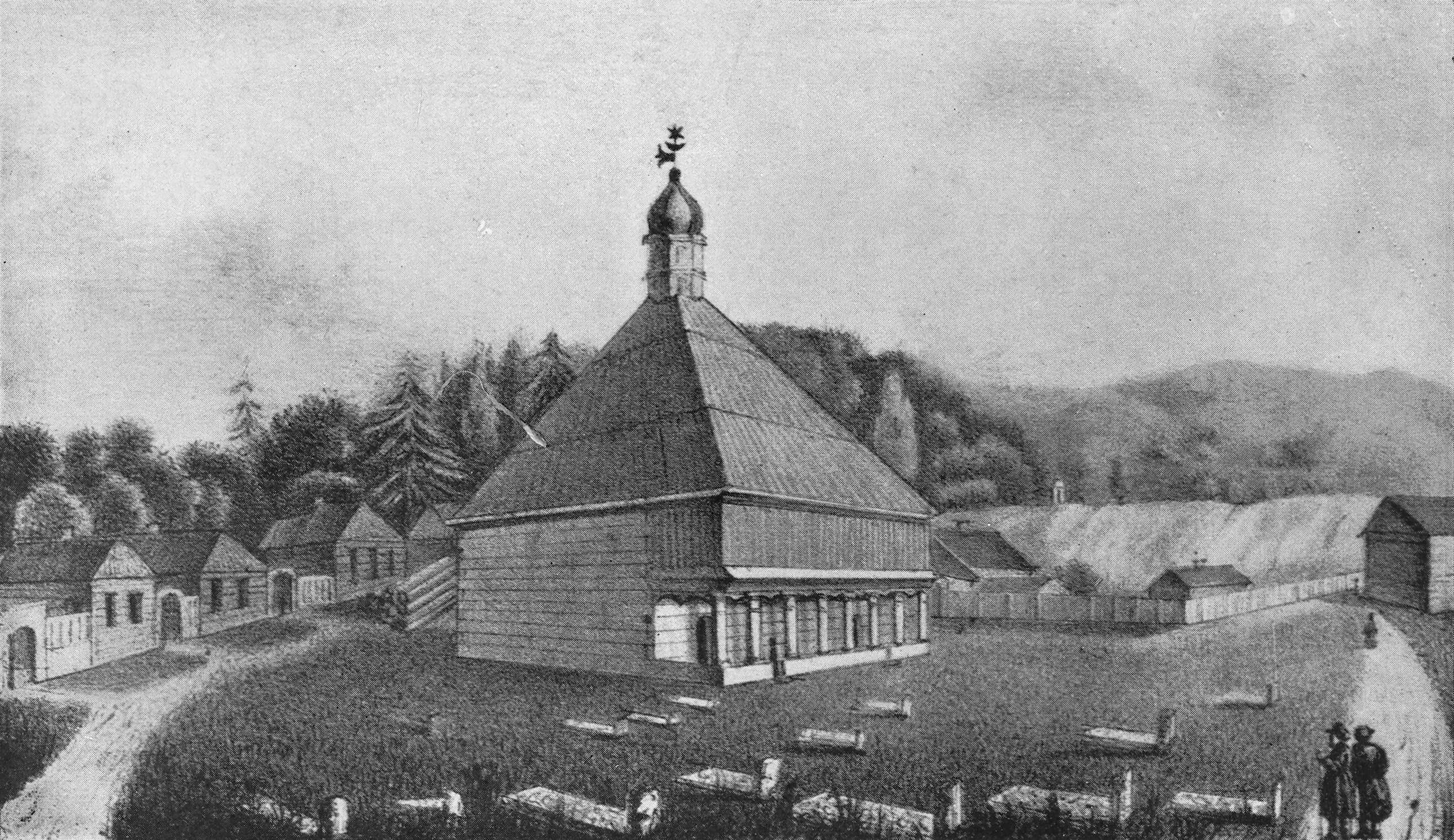
Tatar mosque and graveyard in the Lukiškės suburb (1830), Vilnius. It was replaced by another, a more traditional one, in 1867

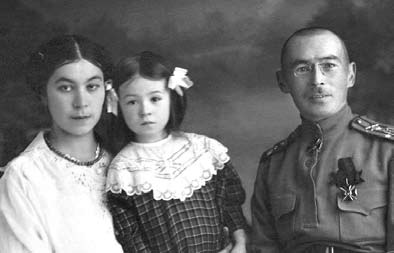
Lipka Tatar family. Hasan Konopacki served as an officer in the Imperial Russian Army

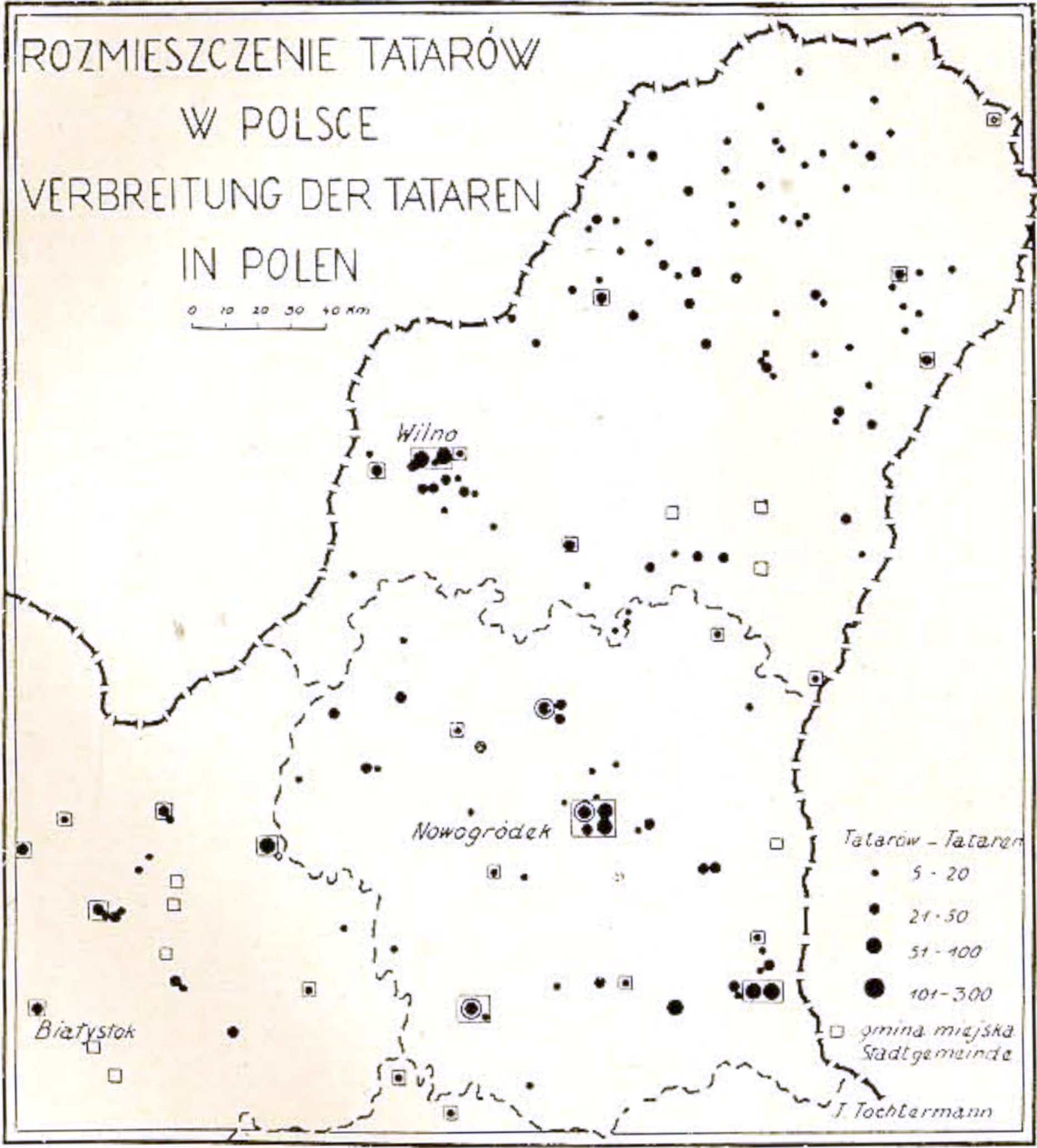
Distribution of Lipka Tatars in Poland (1939)

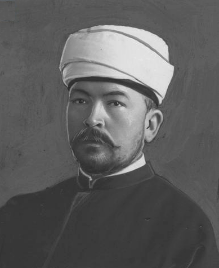
Jakub Szynkiewicz, first mufti of interwar Poland

- 1226: The Khanate of the White Horde was established as one of the successor states to the Mongol Empire of Genghis Khan. The first Khan, Orda was the second son of Jochi, the eldest son of Genghis Khan. The White Horde occupied the southern Siberian steppe from the east of the Urals and the Caspian Sea to Mongolia.
- 1380: Khan Tokhtamysh, the hereditary ruler of the White Horde, crossed west over the Urals and merged the White Horde with the Golden Horde whose first khan was Batu, the eldest son of Jochi. In 1382 the White and Golden Hordes sacked and burned Moscow. Tokhtamysh, allied with the great central Asian Tatar conqueror Tamerlane, reasserted Mongol power in Russia.
- 1397: After a series of disastrous military campaigns against his former protector, the great Tatar warlord Tamerlane, Tokhtamysh and the remnants of his clan were granted asylum and given estates and noble status in Grand Duchy of Lithuania by Vytautas the Great. The settlement of the Lipka Tatars in Lithuania in 1397 is recorded in the Chronicles of Jan Długosz.
- 1397: The Italian city state of Genoa funded a joint expedition by the forces of Khan Tokhtamysh and Grand Duke Vytautas against Tamerlane. This campaign was notable for the fact that the Lipka Tatars and Lithuanian armies were armed with handguns, but no major victories were achieved.
- 15 July 1410: The Battle of Grunwald took place between the Kingdom of Poland and the Grand Duchy of Lithuania on one side (c. 39,000 troops), and the Teutonic Knights on the other (c. 27,000 troops). The Teutonic knights were defeated and never recovered their former influence. After the battle, rumours spread across Europe that the Germans had only been defeated thanks to the aid of tens of thousands of heathen Tatars, though it is likely there were no more than 1,000 Tatar horse archers at the battle, the core being the entourage of Jalal ad-Din, son of Khan Tokhtamysh. At the start of the battle, Jalal ad-Din led the Lipka Tatar and Lithuanian light cavalry on a suicide charge against the Teutonic Knights' artillery positions – the original "Charge of the Light Brigade". The Teutonic Knights' Grand Master Ulrich von Jungingen responded by ordering his own heavy cavalry to pursue the Lipkas away from the field of battle, trampling through their own infantry in the process. The resulting destruction of the Teutonic Knights' line of battle was a major factor in their subsequent defeat. This incident forms one of the highlights of Aleksander Ford's 1960 film Krzyżacy (Knights of the Teutonic Order), based on the historical novel of the same name by Nobel laureate Henryk Sienkiewicz.
- 1528: The Polish (szlachta) and Lithuanian nobility's legal right to retribution on the grounds of the wounding or killing of a nobleman or a member of his family is extended to the Lipka Tatars.
- 1569: The Polish–Lithuanian Commonwealth is founded at the Union of Lublin. Companies of Lipka Tatar light cavalry for a long time constituted one of the foundations of the military power of the Polish–Lithuanian Commonwealth. The Lithuanian Tatars, from the very beginning of their residence in Lithuania were known as the Lipkas. They united their fate with that of Polish–Lithuanian Commonwealth. From the Battle of Grunwald onwards they participated in every significant military campaign.
- 1591: The rule of the fervent Catholic Sigismund III (1587–1632) and the Counter-Reformation movement brought a number of restrictions to the liberties granted to non-Catholics in Poland, the Lipkas amongst others. This led to a diplomatic intervention by Sultan Murad III with the Polish king in 1591 on the question of freedom of religious observance for the Lipkas. This was undertaken at the request of Polish Muslims who had accompanied the Polish King's envoy to Istanbul.
- 1672: The Lipka Rebellion. As a reaction to restrictions on their religious freedoms and the erosion of their ancient rights and privileges, the Lipka Tatar regiments stationed in the Podolia region of south-east Poland abandoned the Commonwealth at the start of the late 17th century Polish–Ottoman Wars that were to last until the end of the 17th century with the Treaty of Karlowitz in 1699. The Lipka Rebellion forms the background to the novel Pan Wolodyjowski, the final volume of the historical Trylogia by Henryk Sienkiewicz, the Nobel Prize winning author (1905) who was himself descended from Christianised Lipka Tatars. The 1969 film Pan Wolodyjowski, directed by Jerzy Hoffman and starring Daniel Olbrychski as Azja Tuhaj-bejowicz, still remains among the biggest box-office successes in the history of Polish cinema.
- 1674: After the famous Polish victory at Chocim, the Lipka Tatars who held the Podolia for Turkey from the stronghold of Bar were besieged by the armies of Jan Sobieski, and a deal was struck that the Lipkas would return to the Polish side subject to their ancient rights and privileges being restored.
- 1676: The Treaty of Zurawno that brought a temporary end to the Polish–Ottoman wars stipulated that the Lipka Tatars were to be given a free individual choice of whether they wanted to serve the Ottoman Empire or the Polish–Lithuanian Commonwealth.
- 1677: The Sejm in March 1677 confirmed all the ancient Tatar rights and privileges. The Lipka Tatars were permitted to rebuild all their old mosques, to settle Christian labour on their estates and to buy up noble estates that had not previously belonged to Tatars. The Lipka Tatars were also freed from all taxation.
- 1679: As a reward for their return to the Commonwealth the Lipka Tatars were settled by King Jan Sobieski on Crown Estates in the provinces of Brest, Kobryn and Hrodna. The Tatars received land that had been cleared of the previous occupants, from 0.5 to 7.5 square kilometres per head, according to rank and length of service.
- 1683: Many of the Lipka Tatar rebels who returned to the service of the Commonwealth in 1674 were later to take part in the Vienna campaign of 1683. This included the 60 Polish Tatars in the light cavalry company of Samuel Mirza Krzeczowski, who was later to save the life of King Jan III Sobieski during the disastrous first day of the Battle of Parkany, a few weeks after the great victory of the Battle of Vienna that was to turn the tide of Islamic expansion into Europe and mark the beginning of the end for the Ottoman Empire. The Lipka Tatars who fought on the Polish side at the Battle of Vienna, on 12 September 1683, wore a sprig of straw in their helmets to distinguish themselves from the Tatars fighting under Kara Mustafa on the Turkish side. Lipkas visiting Vienna traditionally wear straw hats to commemorate their ancestors' participation in the breaking of the Siege of Vienna.
- 1699: Some of the Kamieniec-based Lipka Tatars who had remained loyal to the Turkish Sultan were settled in Bessarabia along the borderlands between the Ottoman Empire and the Polish–Lithuanian Commonwealth as well as in the environs of Chocim and Kamieniec-Podolski and in the town known as Lipkany. A further large scale emigration of Lipkas to Ottoman controlled lands took place early in the 18th century, after the victory won by King Augustus II over the Polish-born King Stanisław Leszczyński, whom the Lipkas had supported in his war against the Saxon King.
- 1775: The Polish Lipkas came back into favour during the reign of the last King, Stanislas Augustus (1765–95). In 1775 the Sejm reaffirmed the noble status of the Polish Lithuanian Tatars. After the Partitions of Poland, the Lipkas played their part in the various national uprisings, and also served alongside the Poles in the Napoleonic army.
- 1919: The Polish Lipkas joined the newly created Polish Army formations; Pułk Jazdy Tatarskiej and later, 13th Regiment of Wilno Uhlans.
- 1939: With the re-emergence of the Polish state after the First World War, a Polish Tatar regiment was re-established in the Polish Army which was distinguished by its own uniforms and banners. After the fall of Poland in 1939, the Polish Tatars in the Wilno (Vilnius) based 13th Cavalry Regiment were one of the last Polish Army units recorded carrying on the fight against the German aggressors while led by Major Aleksander Jeljaszewicz.

== Present status ==
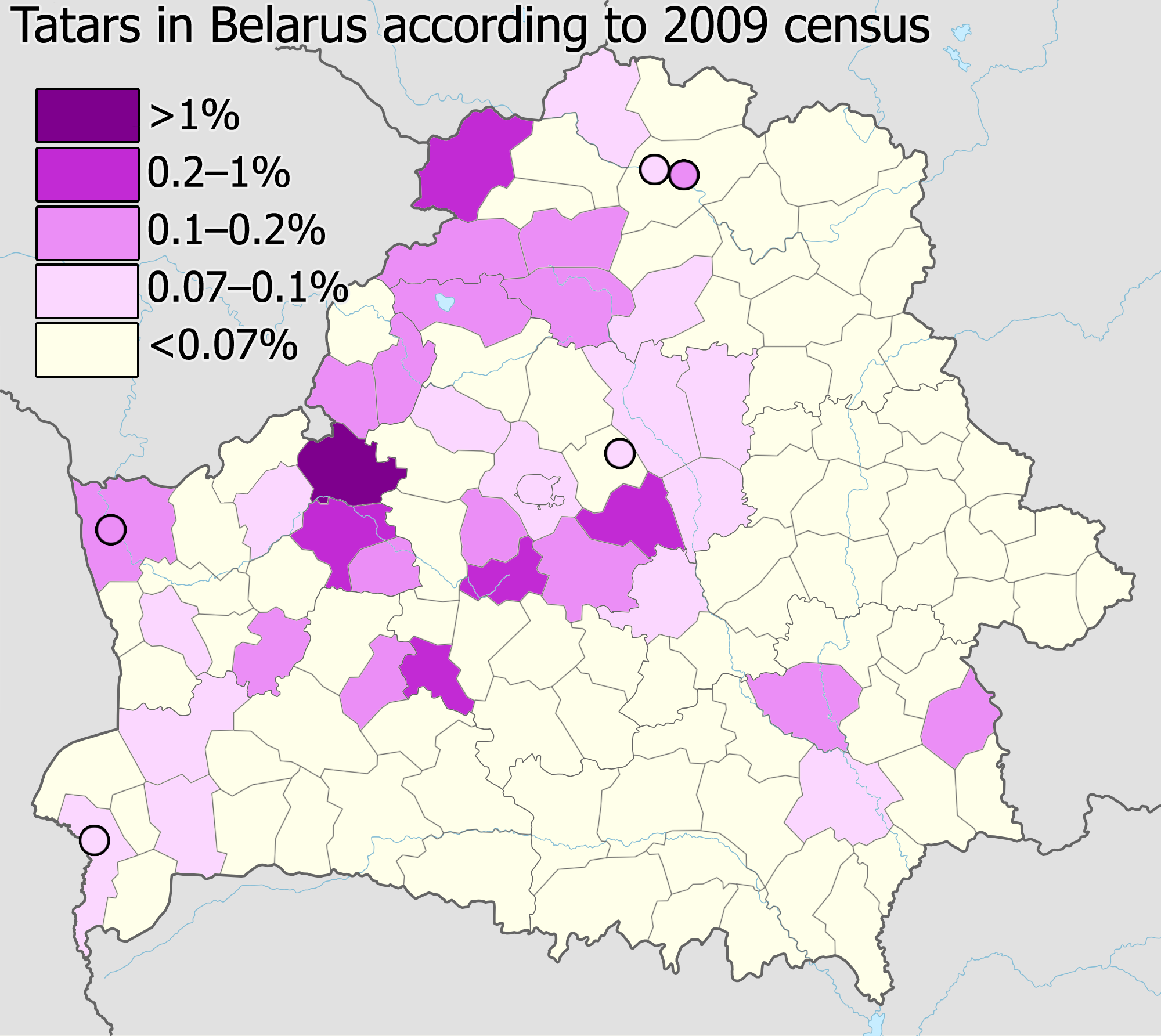
Tatars in Belarus according to 2009 census

A flag of Lipka Tatars in Belarus

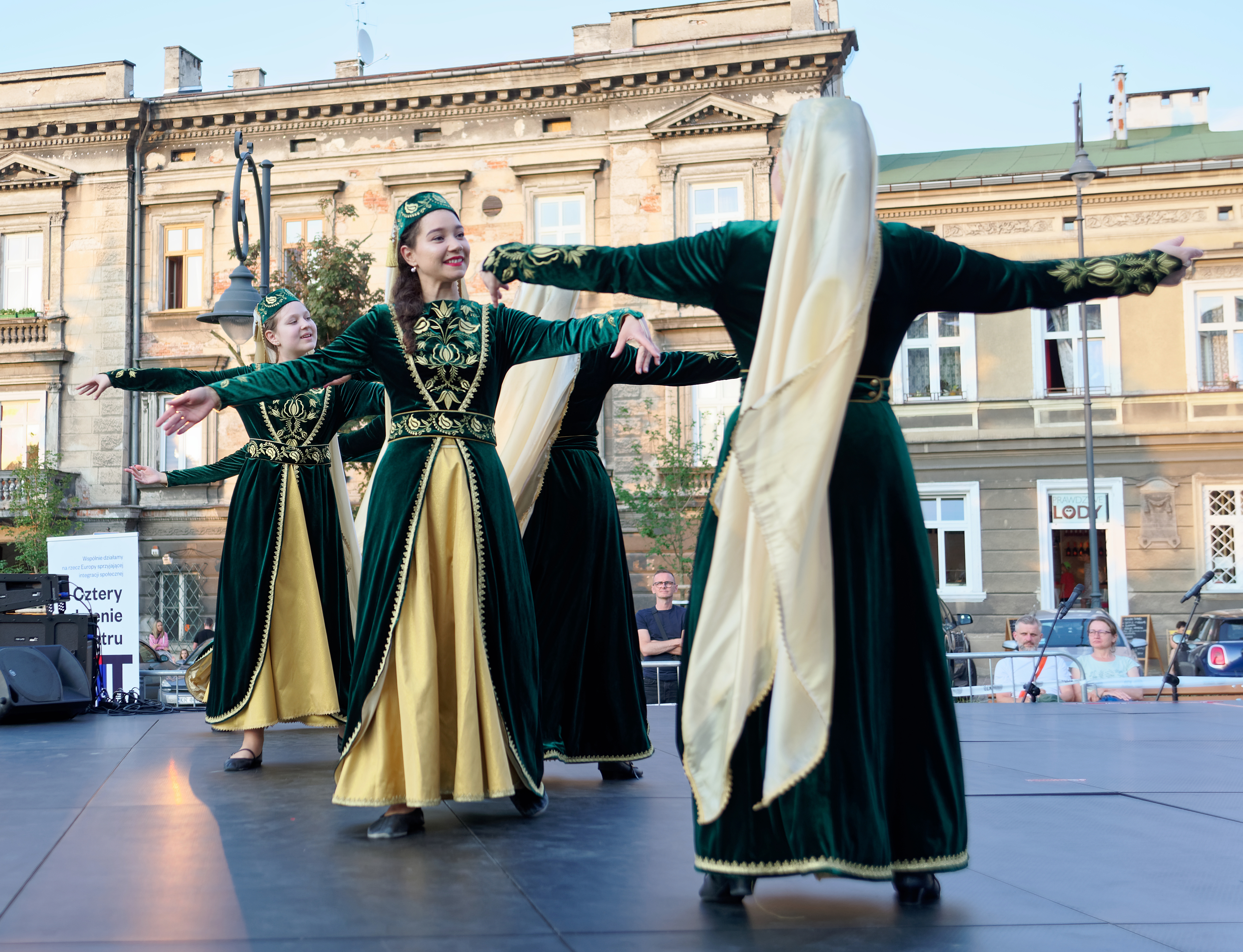
Lipka Tatars, 2021.

There are about 10,000–15,000 Lipka Tatars in the former areas of the Polish–Lithuanian Commonwealth. The majority of descendants of Tatar families in Poland can trace their descent from the nobles of the early Polish–Lithuanian Commonwealth. Lipka Tatars had settlements in north-east Poland, Belarus, Lithuania, south-east Latvia and Ukraine. Most of them reside in Poland, Lithuania, and Belarus.

Most of the Lipka Tatars (80%) assimilated into the ranks of the nobility in the Polish–Lithuanian Commonwealth while some lower noble Tatars assimilated to the Belarusian, Polish, Ukrainian and Lithuanian townsfolk and peasant populations.

A number of the Polish Tatars emigrated to the US at the beginning of the 20th century and settled mostly in the north eastern states, although there is also an enclave in Florida. A small but active community of Lipka Tatars exists in New York City. "The Islamic Center of Polish Tatars" was built in 1928 in Brooklyn, New York City, and functioned until recently.

After the annexation of eastern Poland into the Soviet Union in 1939 and then following World War II, Poland was left with only two Tatar villages, Bohoniki and Kruszyniany. A significant number of the Tatars in the territories annexed by the USSR repatriated to Poland and clustered in cities such as Gdańsk (Maciej Musa Konopacki – patriarch of the Polish Orient), Białystok, Warsaw and Gorzów Wielkopolski totaling some 3,000 people. One of the neighborhoods of Gorzów Wielkopolski where relocated Tatar families resettled has come to be referred to as "the Tatar Hills", or in Polish "Górki Tatarskie".

In 1925 the Muslim Religion Association (Polish: Muzułmański Związek Religijny) was formed in Białystok. In 1992, the Organization of Tatars of the Polish Republic (Polish: Związek Tatarów Rzeczypospolitej Polskiej) with autonomous branches in Białystok and Gdańsk, began operating.

In Poland, the 2011 census showed 1,916 people declaring Tatar ethnicity. The 2021 census did not follow up on this due to statistical confidentiality thresholds.

In November 2010, a monument to Poland's Tatar populace was unveiled in the port city of Gdańsk at a ceremony attended by President Bronislaw Komorowski, as well as Tatar representatives from across Poland and abroad. The monument is a symbol of the important role of Tatars in Polish history. "Tatars shed their blood in all national independence uprisings. Their blood seeped into the foundations of the reborn Polish Republic," President Komorowski said at the unveiling. The monument is the first of its kind to be erected in Europe.

== Genetics ==
Gene pool (Y-DNA) of the Lipka Tatars [Pankratov V. et al., 2016].

=== Y-DNA ===
Lipka Tatars' paternal gene pool comprises 15 haplogroups. Some have clear geographical affinities, including Eastern Europe (Crimea) and the Volga-Urals (N-Tat, R1a-M458, R1a-M558, R1b-M412 and R1b-M478), Central Asia (R1a-Z2125 and Q-M242), South Siberia (Q-M242 and R1b-M478), the Caucasus and the Middle East (G2a-U1, J1-P58, J2a-M410 and J2b-M12).

Dominant Y-DNA haplogroups among Lipka Tatars are R1a (49—54 %) – both Eastern European and Steppe Asiatic one, J2 (18,9 %) which is of Middle Eastern and south Asian origin, haplogroup Q (10,8 %), and R1b Other haplogroups are G (8.1%), N (5.4%) and J1 (2.7%).

=== mtDNA ===
According to one research, Lipka Tatars' mtDNA consists of combination of Eastern Eurasian and Western Eurasian haplogroups. The source of Eastern Eurasian haplogroups are populations of Central Asia, Eastern and Southern Siberia, while the source of Western Eurasian haplogroups can be linked with Belarusians and other Eastern Europeans. In another research, the dominant are haplogroups, common in Central Asia (Kazakhs, Kyrgyz), Volga-Ural region (Volga Tatars, Kalmyks), Siberia (Yakuts, Evenki), and Eastern Asia (Han Chinese, Tibetans).

=== Autosomal DNA ===
According to the whole genome sequencing, around two-thirds of the Lipka Tatar genomes are composed of the European and Middle Eastern/Caucasus components, with remaining one-third belonging to two sub-variants of the general East Eurasian component: East Asian and Siberian. Taken together, both PC and ADMIXTURE analyses suggest the presence of a significant amount of East Eurasian-specific alleles among the autosomal genomes of Lipka Tatars.

Lipka Tatars can be modelled as 30% Mongola-like and 70% Hungarian-like.

The proportion of East Eurasian component is substantially higher when compared to many Turkic-speaking populations in western Eurasia such as Gagauz, Turks, Iranian Azeri, Balkars, Kumyks and Turkmens, and is as high as in the Volga Tatars.

== Famous Lipka Tatar descendants ==
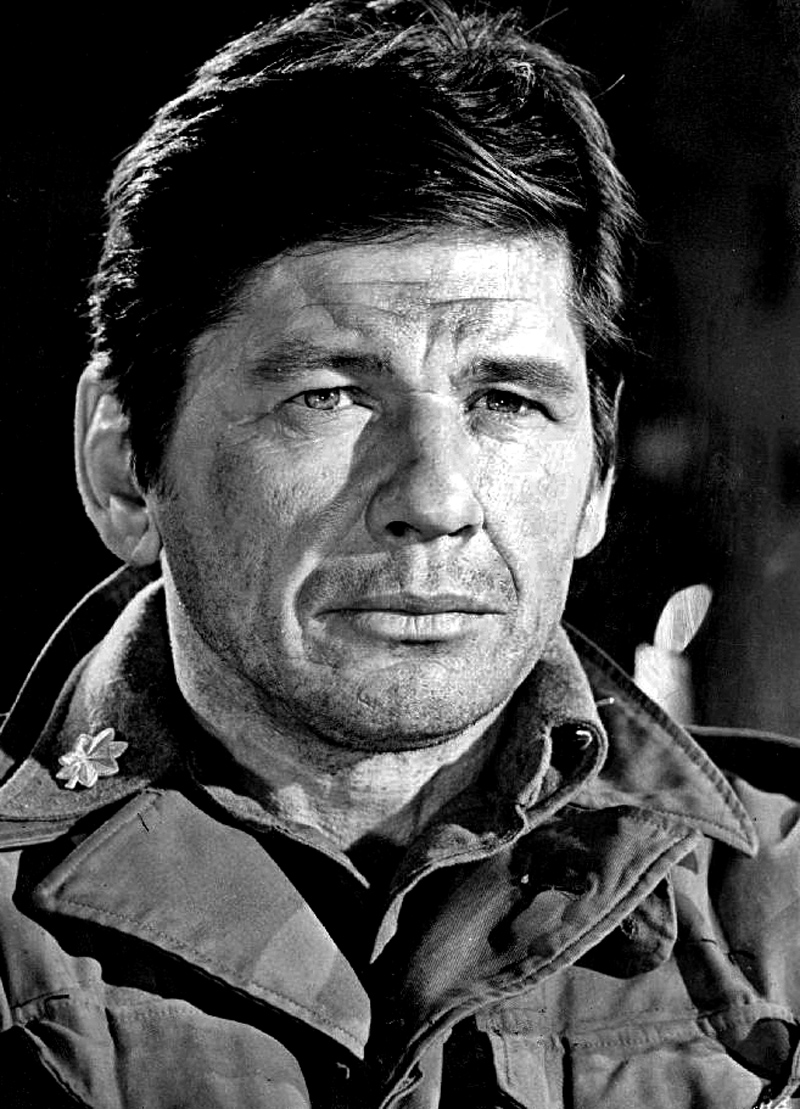
Charles Bronson, actor

- Hasan Konopacki – military and political leader
- Ahatanhel Krymsky - linguist and historian
- Aleksander Jeljaszewicz – military leader
- Ibrahim Kanapacki – religious, political, and cultural leader
- Tomasz Miśkiewicz – mufti
- Ferdynand Antoni Ossendowski – writer and political activist
- Aleksander Romanowicz – military leader
- Aleksander Sulkiewicz – politician
- Charles Bronson – actor (father Lipka Tatar)
- Glen Powell – actor
- Fatma Mukhtarova – opera singer (mother Lipka Tatar)
- Henryk Sienkiewicz – novelist (paternally of distant Lipka Tatar ancestry)
- Maciej Sulkiewicz – military and political leader
- Mikhail Tugan-Baranovsky – economist and politician (paternally of partial Lipka Tatar ancestry)
- Sulaiman Abdul Rahman Taib – politician (mother Lipka Tatar)
- Hanifah Hajar Taib – politician (mother Lipka Tatar)
- Jarosław Marek Rymkiewicz – poet
- Osman Achmatowicz – chemist
- Mustafa Edige Kirimal – politician
- Jakub Szynkiewicz – mufti
- Stepan Krichinsky – architect
- Halina Konopacka – athlete
- Adam Mickiewicz - writer and publisher (maternally of distant Lipka Tatar ancestry)
- Lili Dehn – aristocrat and memoirist
- Thadeus Bulgarin - writer, journalist and publisher

Two distantly related members of the Abakanowicz family:

- Bruno Abakanowicz – mathematician, inventor and electrical engineer (distant paternal Lipka Tatar ancestry)
- Magdalena Abakanowicz – sculptor and fiber artist (distant paternal Lipka Tatar ancestry)

== Gallery ==
=== Lipka Tatar mosques ===
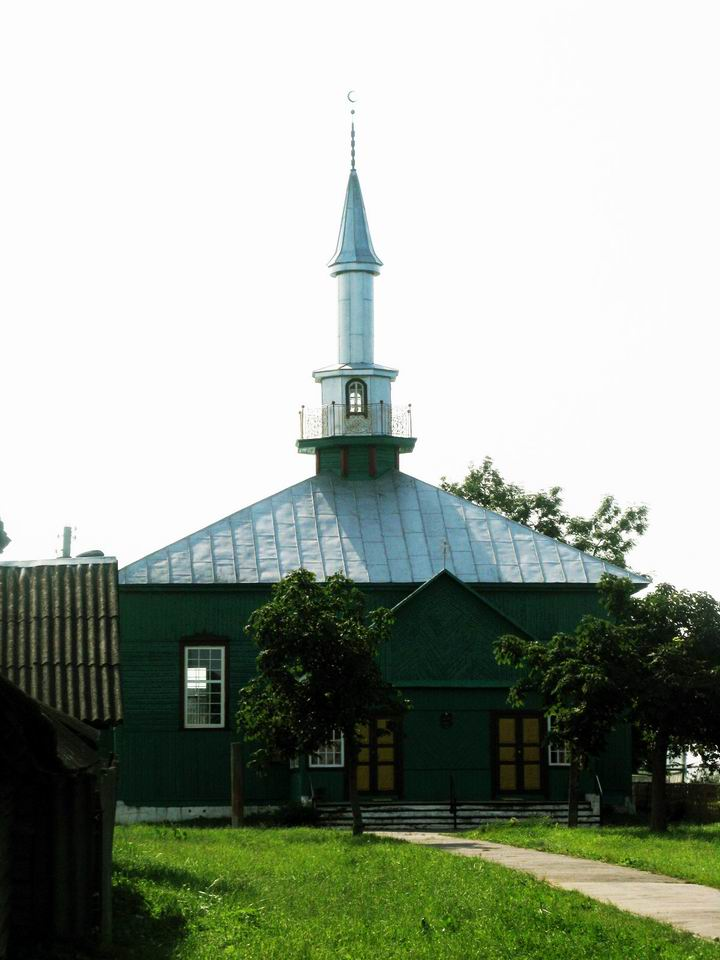
Tatar mosque in the town Iwye, Belarus

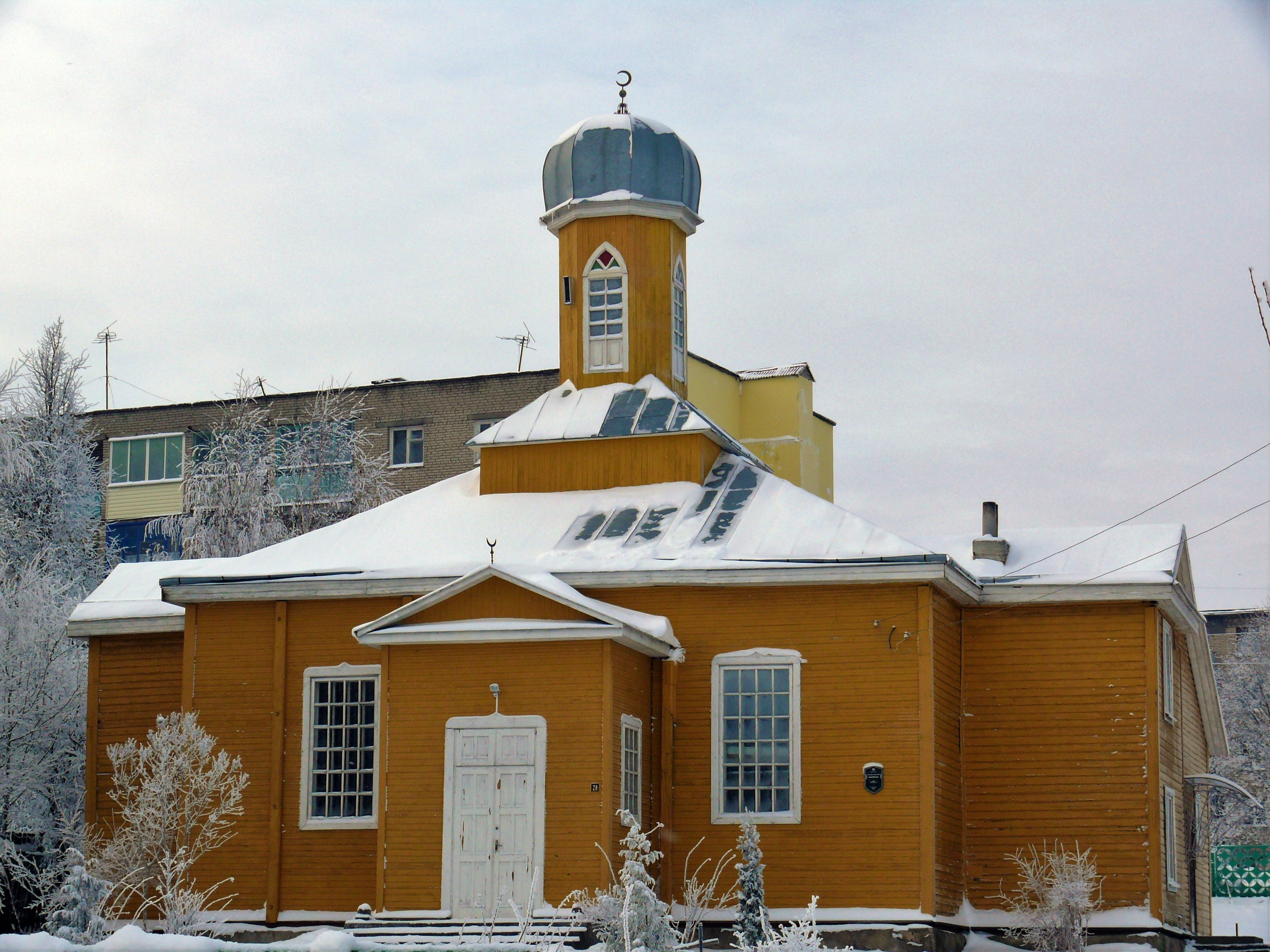
Tatar mosque in the city Navahrudak, Belarus

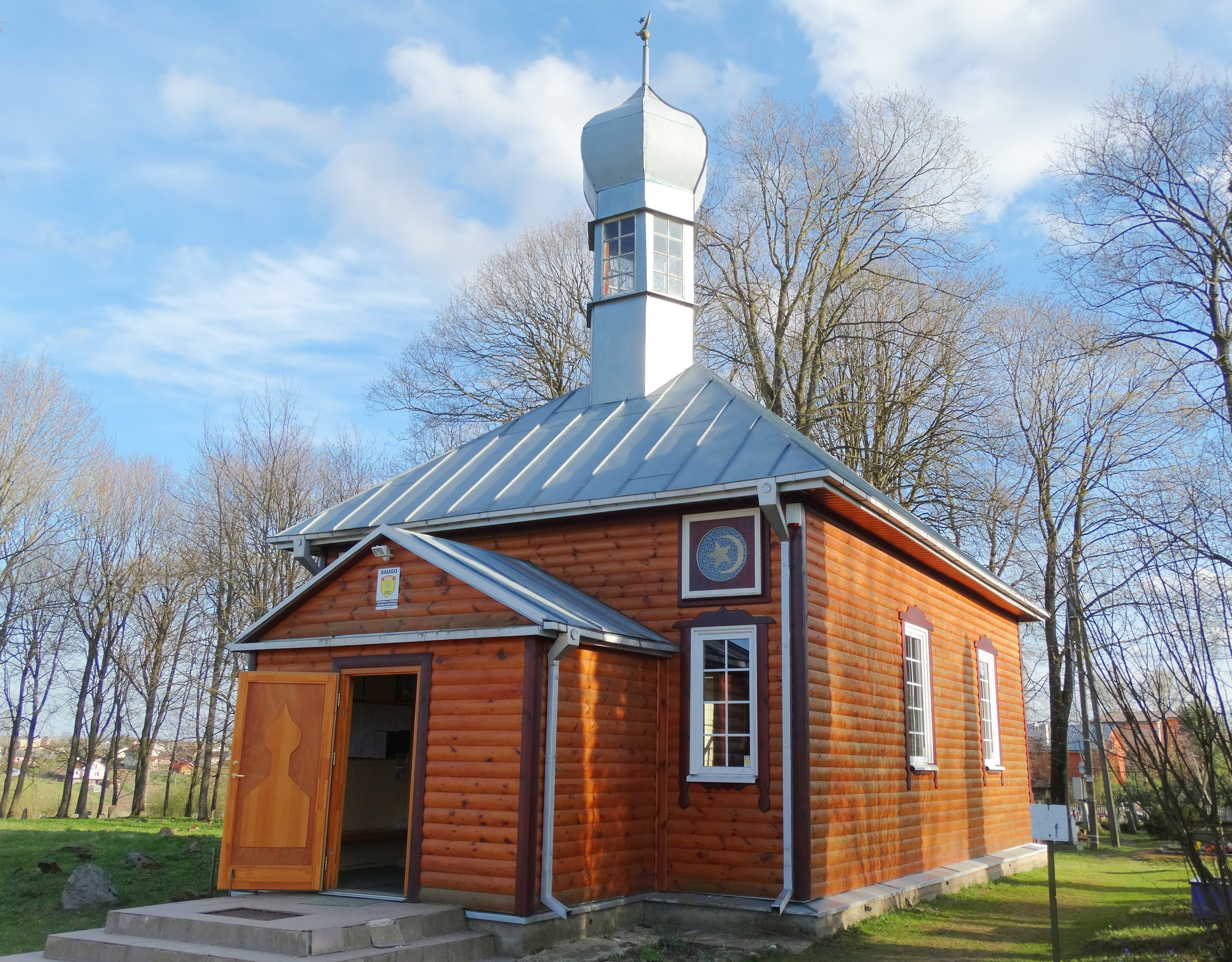
Tatar mosque in Nemėžis, Lithuania

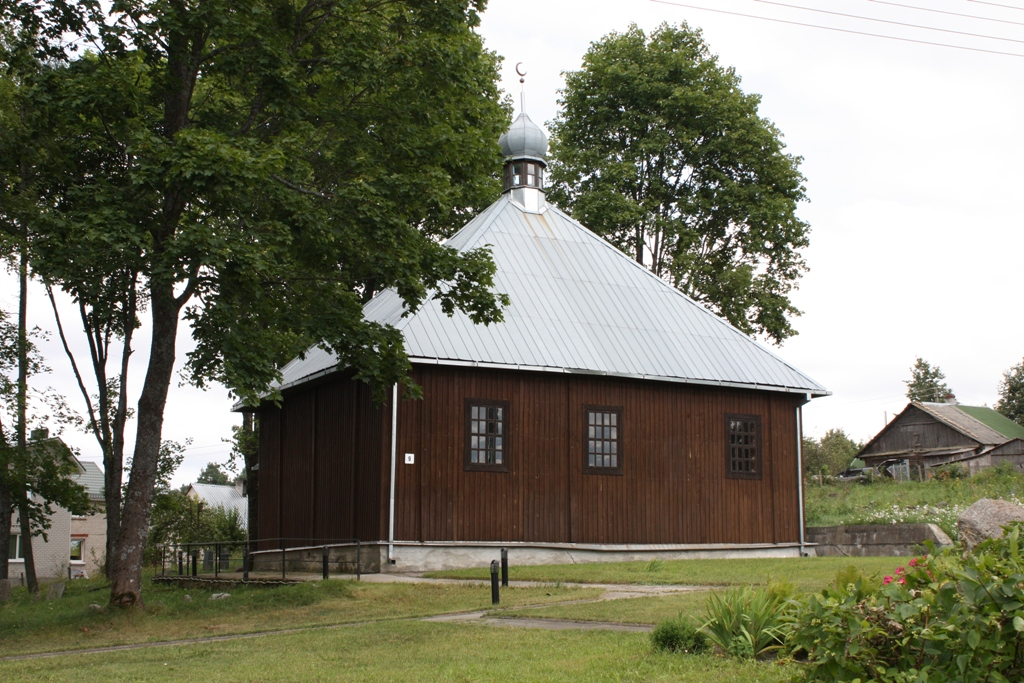
Tatar mosque in Keturiasdešimt Totorių, Lithuania

Tatar mosque, built in Kaunas in 1930, quincentennial year of Vytautas the Great passing

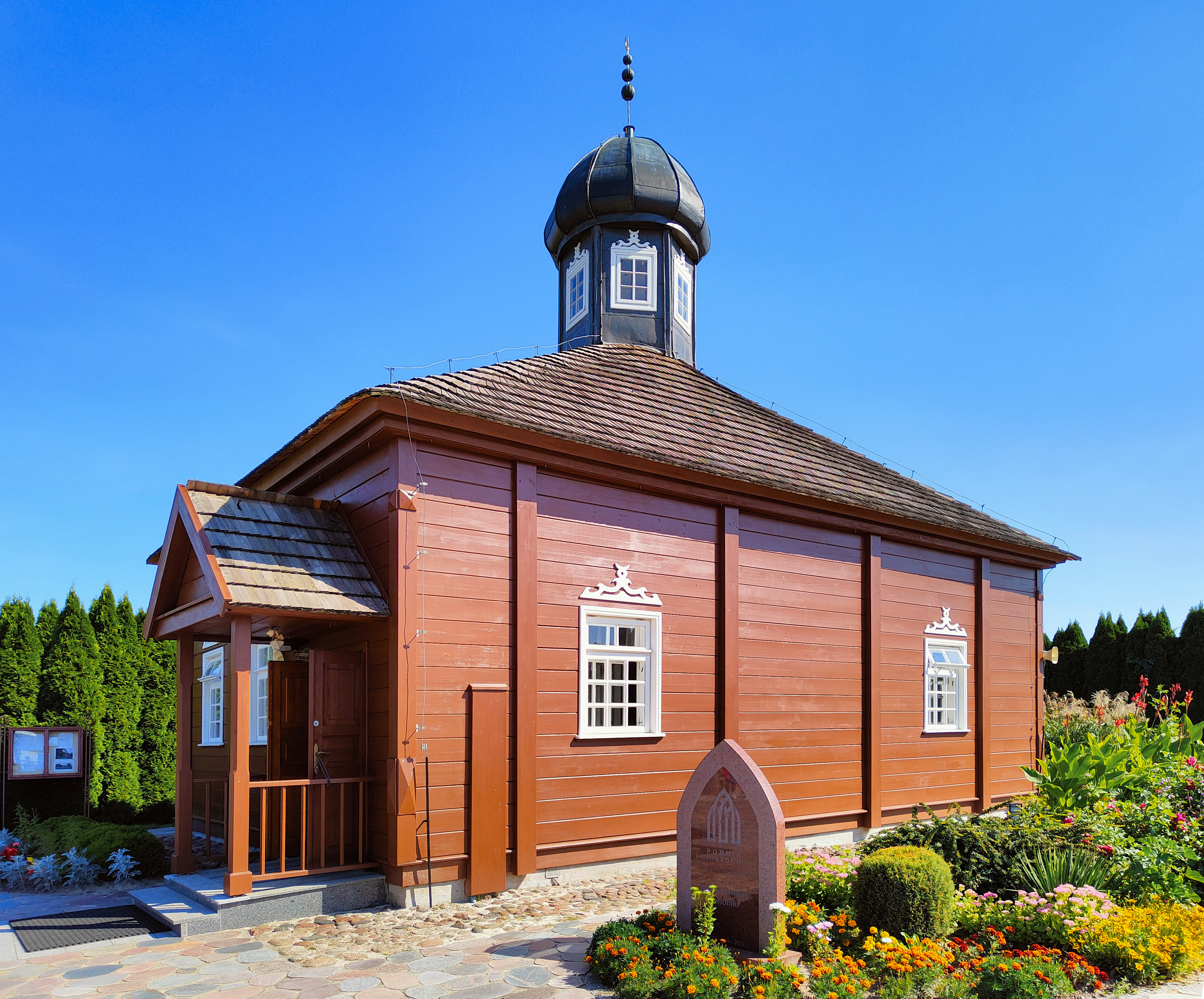
Tatar mosque in Bohoniki, Poland

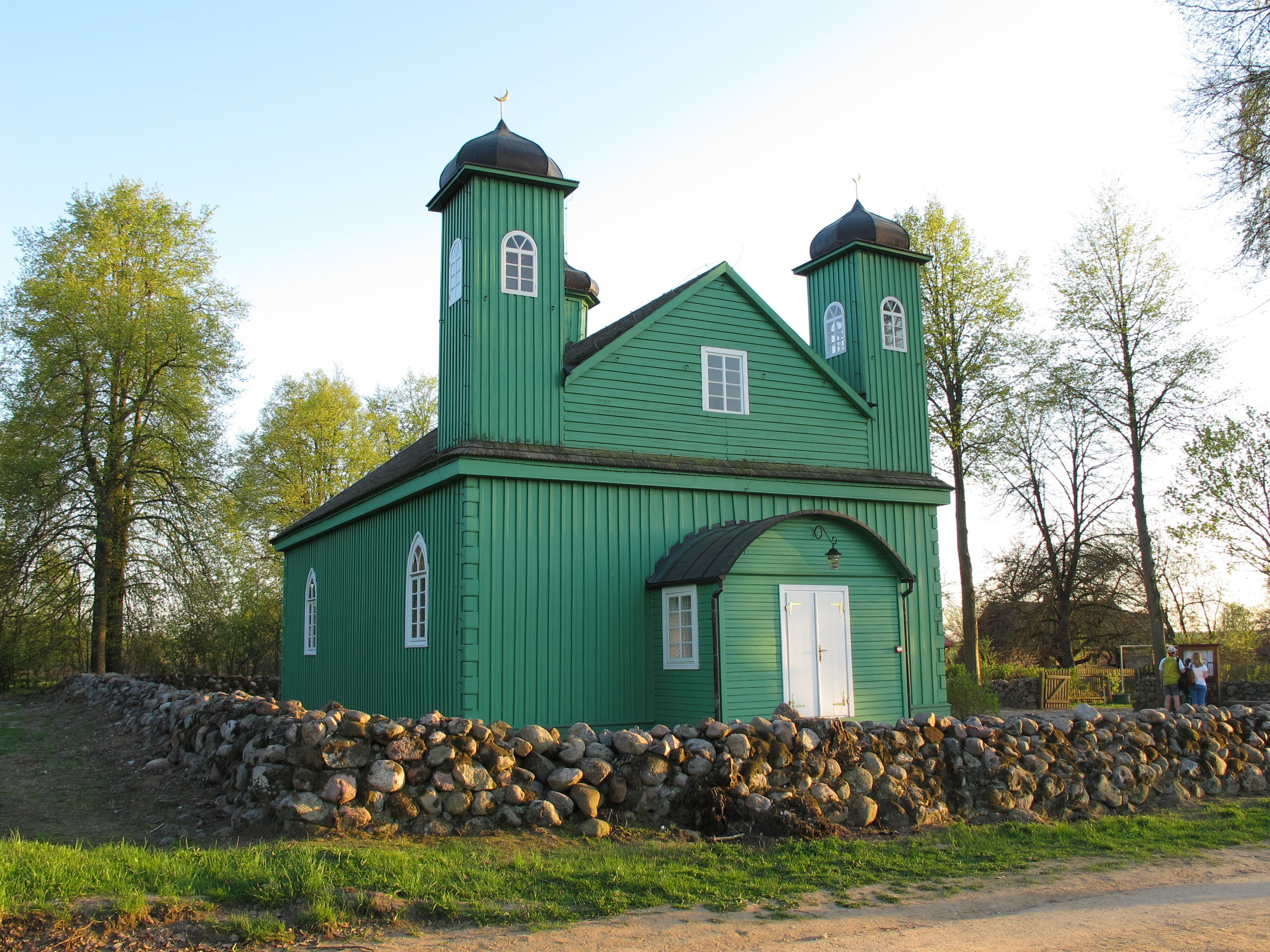
Tatar mosque in Kruszyniany, Poland

=== Tatar graves at Powązki cemetery in Warsaw ===
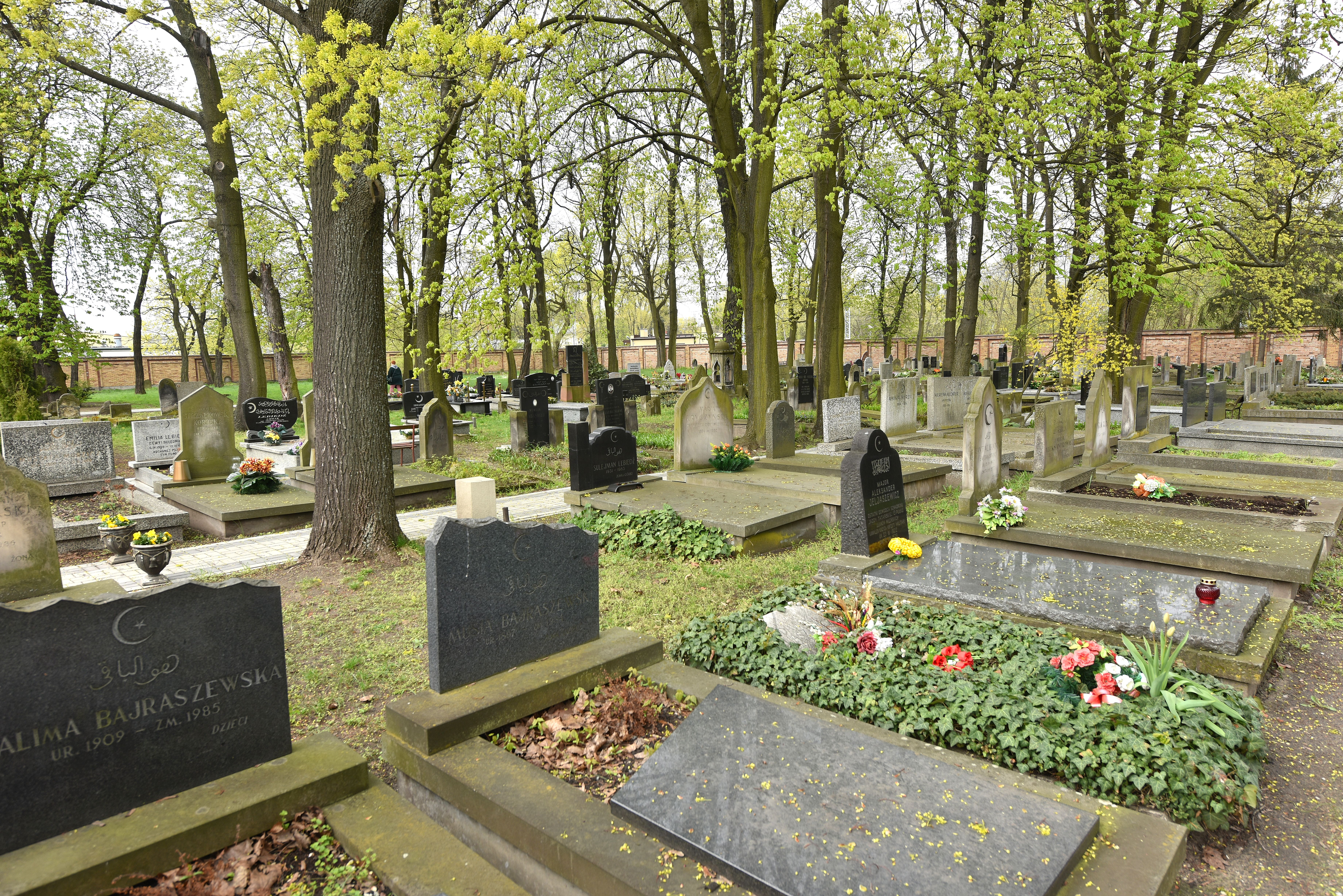

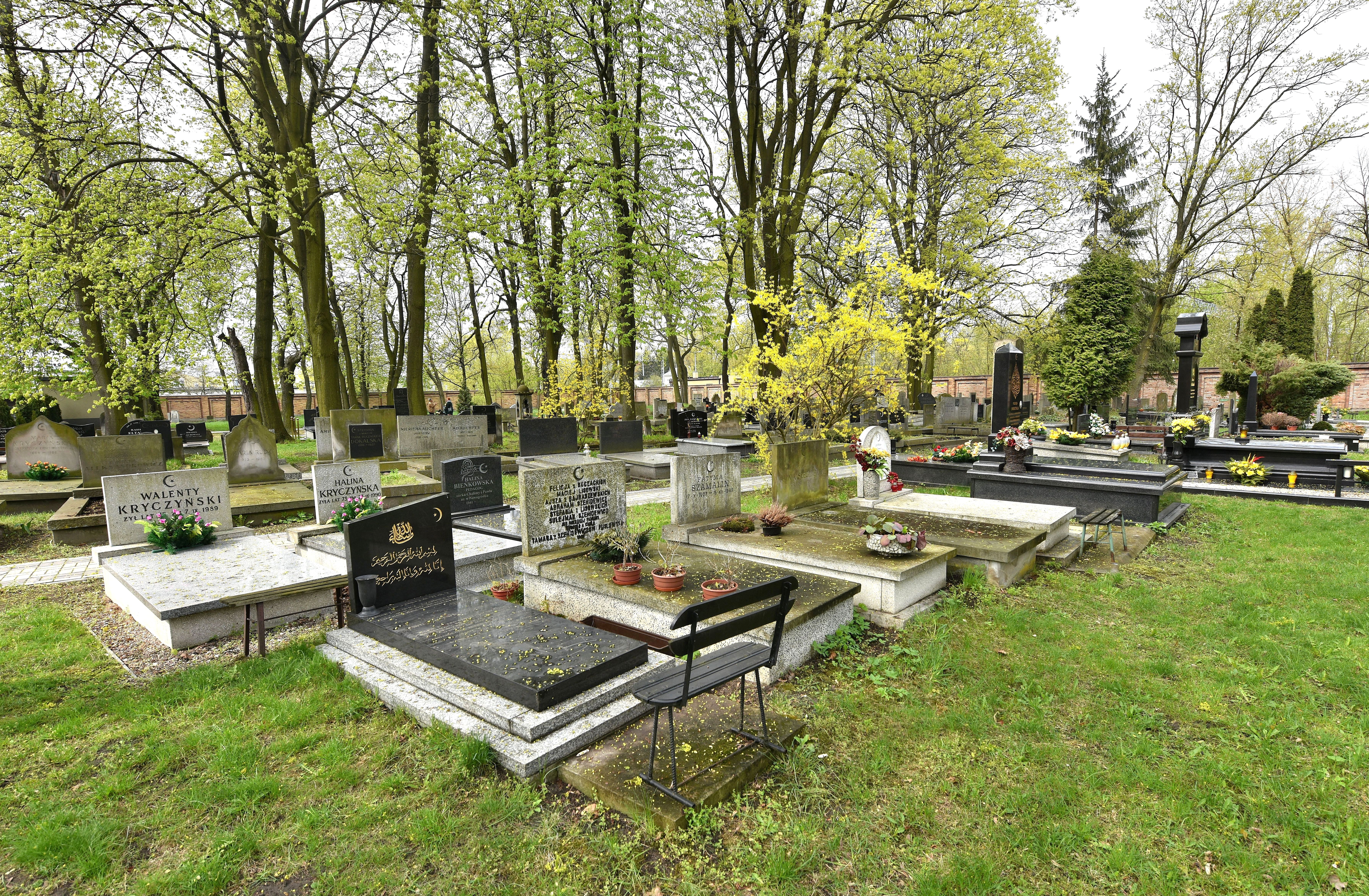

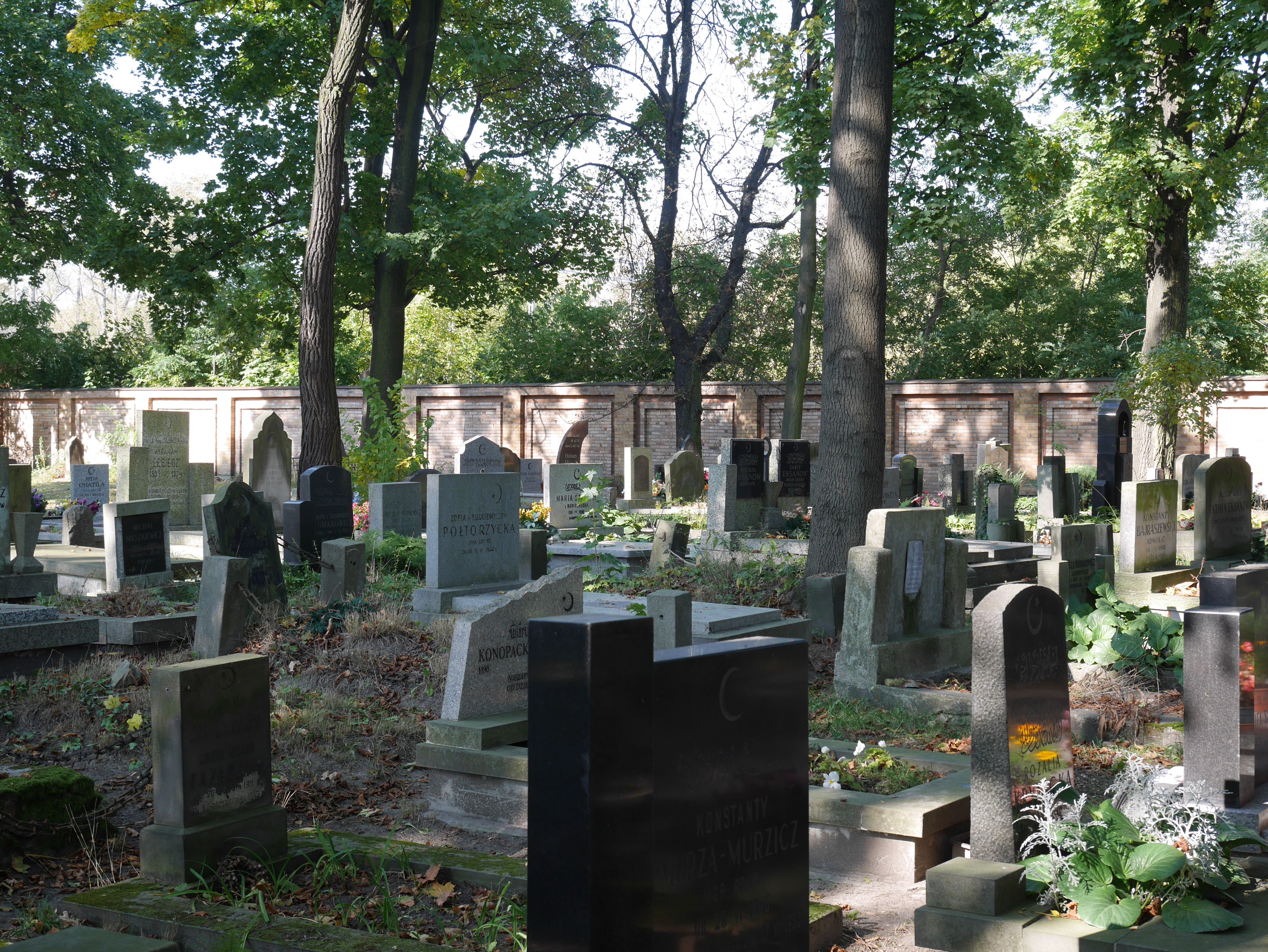

== See also ==
- Lipka rebellion
- Powers Street Mosque
- Tatar invasions
- List of Polish wars
- Uhlan
- Belarusian Arabic alphabet
- Lithuanian Tatars of the Imperial Guard
- Islam in Belarus
- Islam in Lithuania
- Islam in Poland
