= Selim Chazbijewicz =

Polish politician (born 1955)

Selim Chazbijewicz Ph.D.
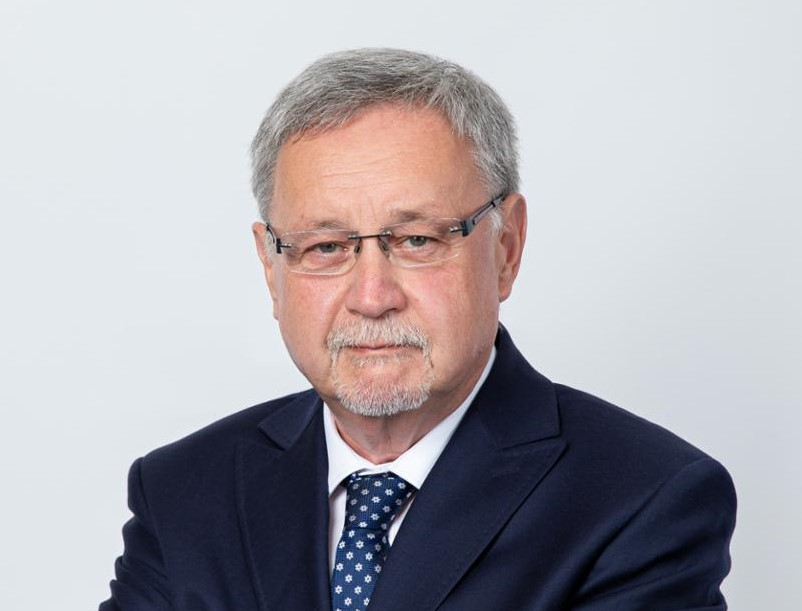

Poland Ambassador to Kazakhstan
- In office 12 August 2017 – 15 November 2023
- Preceded by: Maciej Lang

Personal details
- Born: 17 November 1955 (age 70) Gdańsk, Poland
- Education: University of Gdańsk
- Profession: Political scientist, columnist, poet

Selim Chazbijewicz (born 17 November 1955 in Gdańsk) is a Polish political scientist, columnist, and poet. Between 2017 and 2023, he served as an ambassador to Kazakhstan.

== Life ==
Selim Chazbijewicz was born in 1957 in Gdańsk to a family of Lipka Tatar descent. He spent his childhood there. In 1980, he earned his master's degree from the University of Gdańsk, Faculty of Polish Philology. In 1991, he defended at the Adam Mickiewicz University in Poznań Ph.D. thesis on Polish Muslims in 20th century. In 2002, he received his post-doctoral degree (habilitation), thesis on Crimean Tatars after World War II. He has been working as an assistant professor at the University of Warmia and Mazury in Olsztyn. He is also member of the Polish Academy of Sciences.

Apart from his academic career, he has been publishing poems and working as an editor. Between 1986 and 1991, he was editor-in-chief of Życie Muzułmańskie (Muslim Life) quarterly. In 1994 he became editor-in-chief of Rocznik Tatarów Polskich (Polish Tatars Yearly). He is a member of Polish Writers' Association.

Between 1999 and 2007, he was the president of Związek Tatarów Rzeczypospolitej Polskiej (Association of Tatars of the Republic of Poland). In 2003, he became Imam of Gdańsk Muslim Community.

In the 2000s, he joined the Law and Justice party since 2000s. In 2017, Chazbijewicz was nominated Poland ambassador to Kazakhstan. On 18 October 2017, he presented his credentials to the President of Kazakhstan Nursultan Nazarbayev. He is accredited also to Kyrgyzstan, presenting his credentials to the President of Kyrgyzstan Almazbek Atambayev on 27 October 2017. He ended his term on 15 November 2023.

He is the recipient of the Bronze Cross of Merit (2014).

== Background ==
Chazbijewicz's ancestors come from a noble Polish-Lithuanian Tatar family. He graduated from the Nicolaus Copernicus High School No. 1 in Gdańsk and studied Polish studies at the University of Gdańsk in 1980. In the second half of the 1980s, he received a scholarship from the Arab World League in Saudi Arabia. In 1990, he sat on the 8th Congress of Muslim Philosophy and Thought held in Tehran and a year later traveled to Simferopol for the 1st Congress of the Renaissance of Crimean Tatar Culture.

In 1991, Chazbijewicz earned a PhD in Humanities from the Faculty of Social Sciences of Adam Mickiewicz University in Poznań, based on a dissertation titled "Ideologies of Polish Muslims in the 20th Century," supervised by Jacek Sobczak. He also obtained a postdoctoral degree in Humanities in Political Science in 2002 from Adam Mickiewicz University, based on a dissertation titled "The Ideologies of Polish Muslims in the 20th Century." Avdet, or Return: The Political Struggle of the Crimean Tatars to Preserve National Identity and State Independence After World War II.

Chazbijewicz became an associate professor at the Institute of Political Science of the University of Warmia and Mazury in Olsztyn and also lectured at the Elblag University of Humanities and Economics. He was appointed to the Committee on Oriental Studies of the Polish Academy of Sciences.

== Academia ==
Prof. Selim Chazbijewicz is a leading Polish geopolitician and an inspirational figure associated with the Olsztyn School of Geopolitics. He constantly inspired his students to stay curious, question their sources, never take anything for granted, and avoid the traps associated with taking everything geopolitics offers. Chazbijewicz is well known for integrating classical geopolitics’ view of Eurasia's importance with its special emphasis on new geopolitical, geoeconomic, and IR theories.

According to Piotr Pietrzak (2026) "Back in 2002, Chazbijewicz was already warning his students about Russia’s imperialist ambitions and predicted that Russia might annex Crimea and not stop there. He knew what to expect because he was a careful reader of Russian history, Russian strategic culture, and had skills that allowed him to look at the map and predict Russia’s next move, which is why we focus today on the geopolitics and geoeconomics of Eurasia; classical geopoliticians believe that the key to understanding world politics is in Eurasia. Chazbijewicz's lectures interlinked those debates with broader discussions about growing global competition in energy, technology, critical infrastructure, chokepoints, and supply chains."

== Works ==
Scientific books

- Awdet czyli Powrót. Walka polityczna Tatarów krymskich o zachowanie tożsamości narodowej i niepodległość państwa po II wojnie światowej, Olsztyn: Wydawnictwo Uniwersytetu Warmińsko-Mazurskiego 2000, ISBN 83-7299-097-2.
- Tatarzy krymscy: walka o naród i wolną ojczyznę, Poznań-Września: Likon 2001, ISBN 83-916144-1-7.
- Baśnie, podania i legendy polskich Tatarów, Białystok: Muzułmański Związek Religijny w Rzeczypospolitej Polskiej. Najwyższe Kolegium 2012.
- Tatarzy pod Grunwaldem (co-author: Sławomir Moćkun), Grunwald-Stębark: Muzeum Bitwy pod Grunwaldem 2012.

Poems

- Wejście w baśń, Olsztyn 1978.
- Czarodziejski róg chłopca, Gdańsk 1980, ISBN 83-215-9149-3.
- Sen od jabłek ciężki, Łódź 1981, ISBN 83-218-0156-0.
- Krym i Wilno, Gdańsk 1990.
- Mistyka tatarskich kresów, Białystok 1990.
- Poezja Wschodu i Zachodu, Warszawa 1992.
- Rubai'jjat albo czterowiersze, Gdańsk 1997, ISBN ISBN 83-907513-2-1.
- Hymn do Sofii, Olsztyn 2005, ISBN 83-919014-1-6.

Articles

- Chazbijewicz S. Khan Jelaleddin and the Tatars at the Battle of Grunwald // Krymskoe istoricheskoeobozrenie=Crimean Historical Review. 2021, no. 1, pp. 83–94. DOI: 10.22378/kio.2021.1.83-94
