= Pagiriai (Vilnius) =

- Village
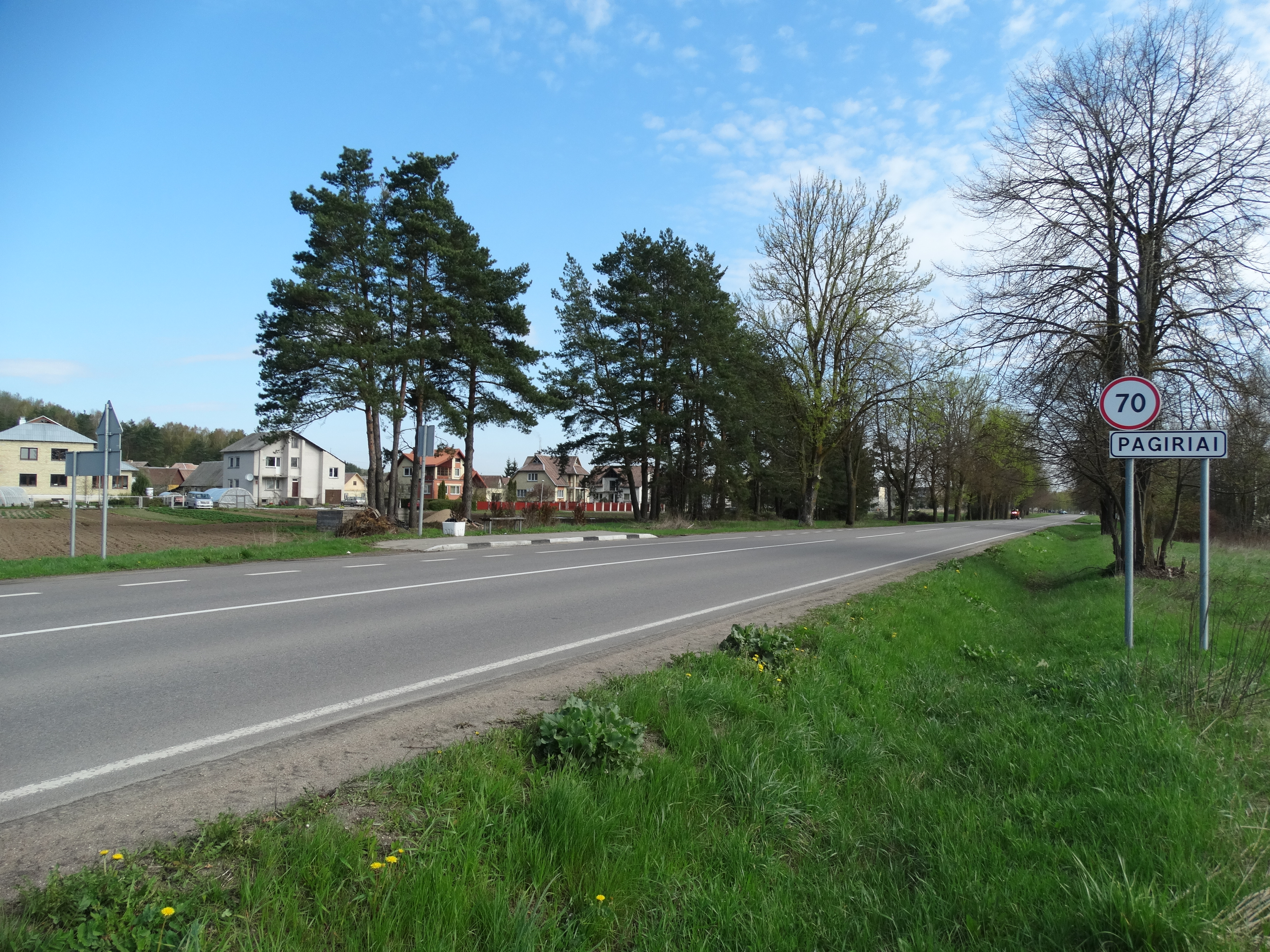
- Entrance to Pagiriai

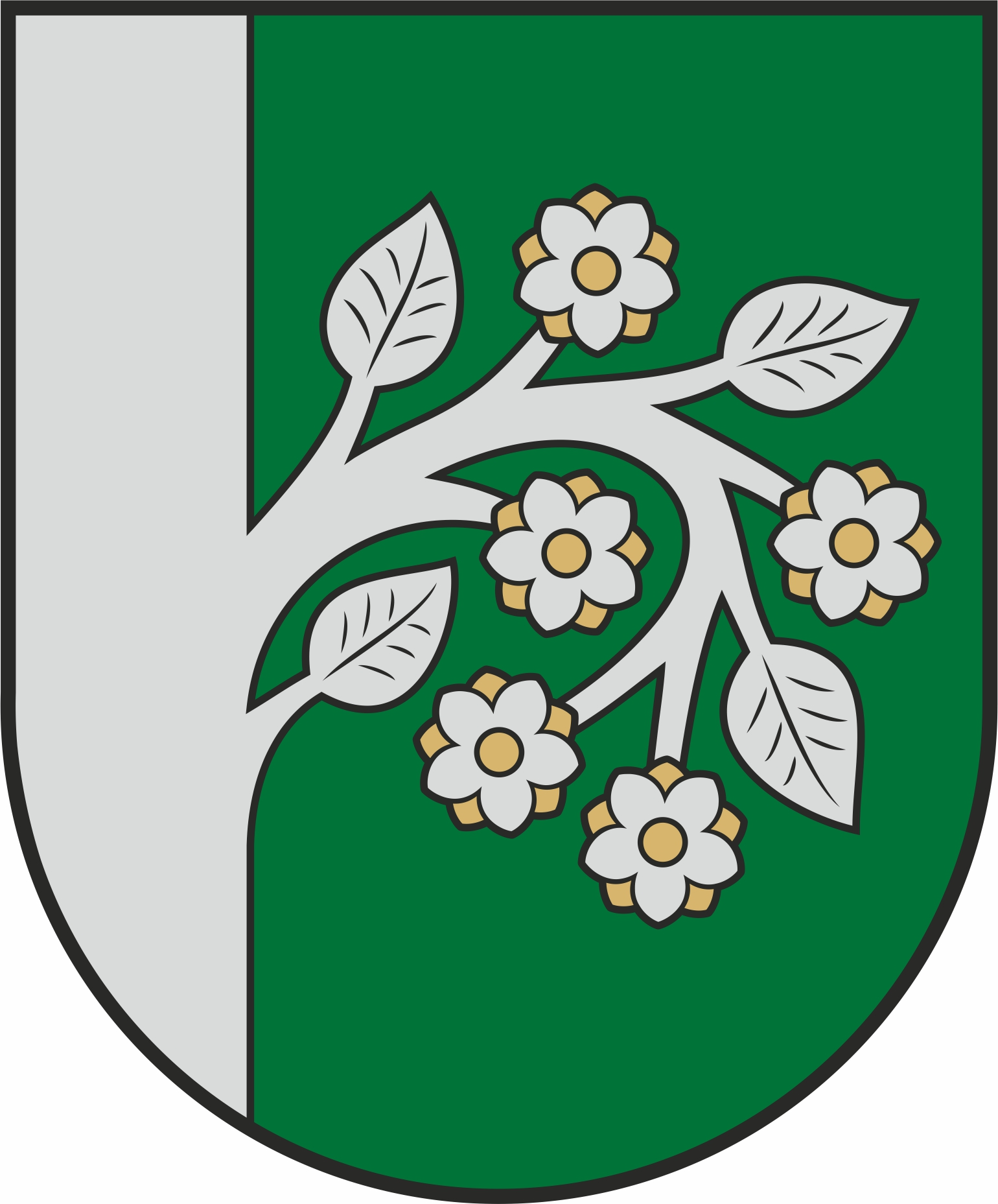
- Coat of arms

- Location of Pagiriai
- Coordinates: 54°34′59″N 25°11′31″E
- Country: Lithuania
- County: Vilnius County
- Municipality: Vilnius District Municipality
- Eldership: Pagiriai Eldership
- Capital of: Pagiriai Eldership

Population (2021)
  - Total: 3,324
- Time zone: UTC+2 (EET)
  - Summer (DST): UTC+3 (EEST)

Pagiriai is a small town in Vilnius District Municipality, Lithuania. It is located less than 1 kilometre (0.62 mi) south of Vilnius city administrative border. According to the 2021 census, it had a population of 3,324, a decrease from 3,451 in 2011 and from 3,929 in 2001.

== History ==
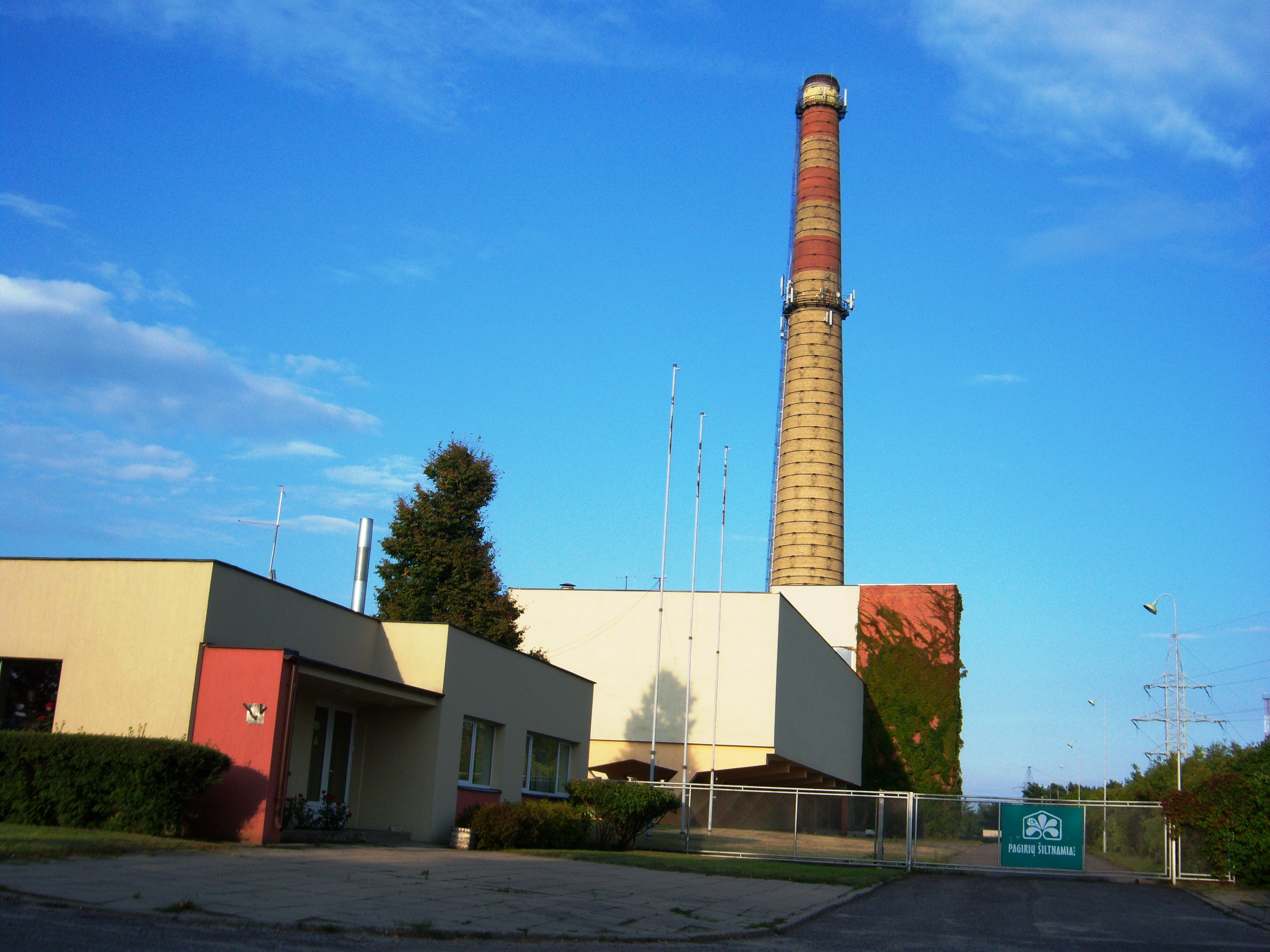
Pagiriai greenhouse complex—the largest in the Baltic states during the Soviet times

Kazaklar and Karnaklar – two Lithuanian Tatar villages before World War II – were merged and renamed Pagiriai after the war (see Keturiasdešimt Totorių for the history of Tatars of Pagiriai eldership). In 1970, the largest greenhouse complex in the Baltic states was established and multi-flat housing for its workers was built during 1970–1990. As a result, the number of inhabitants of the village grew from 251 in 1970 to 3,776 in 1989.

== Inhabitants ==
Pagiriai is a center of Pagiriai eldership, which covers an area of 87.2 square kilometres (33.7 sq mi). There are 25 settlements in the eldership. According to the census of 2011, there were 7,341 inhabitants in the Pagiriai elderate. The ethnographic composition of the eldership is very diverse. According to the census of 2011, there were 37.1% Lithuanians, 44.8% – Poles, 8.6% – Russians in 2011. Belarusians, Ukrainians, Lithuanian Tatars and others constituted the rest 9.5% of the population. The largest villages of the elderate were Pagiriai, Vaidotai (1,387) and Keturiasdešimt Totorių (451). The newest census of 2021 showed, that in Pagiriai eldership with a total population of 7,147, 2818 inhabitants (39,4%) were Lithuanians, 3031 (42,4%) were Poles, 556 (7.8%) – Russians, 282 (3,9%) – Belarusians, 64 (0,9%) – Ukrainians and 386 (5,4%) other peoples.
