= Baltoji Vokė (Vilnius) =

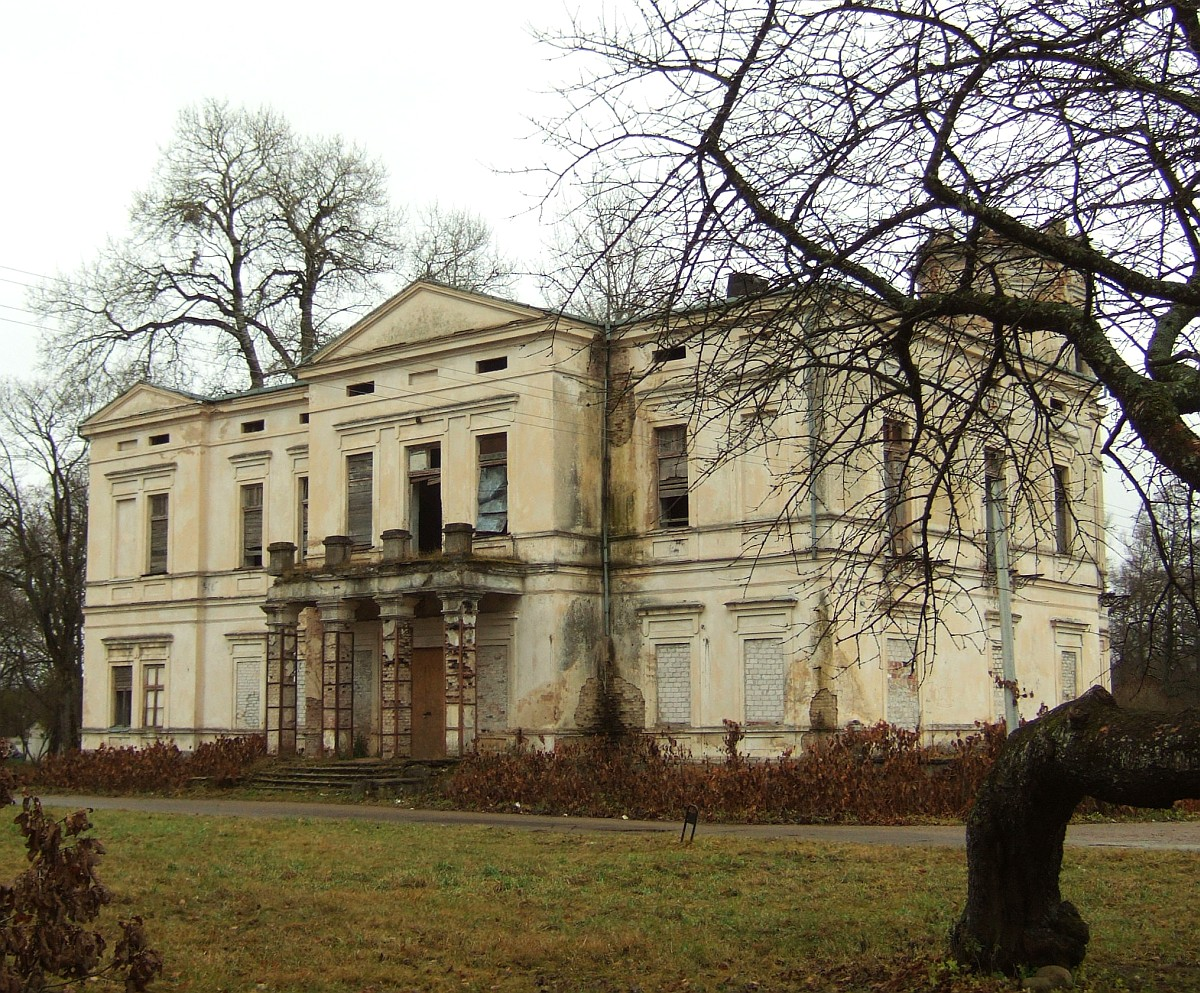
- Baltoji Vokė Manor

- Location within Lithuania
- Coordinates: 54°36′00″N 25°11′40″E
- Country: Lithuania
- County: Vilnius County
- Municipality: Vilnius District Municipality

Population (2011)
  - Total: 369
- Time zone: UTC+2 (EET)
  - Summer (DST): UTC+3 (EEST)

Baltoji Vokė is a village situated within the Vilnius District Municipality in Lithuania. Baltoji Vokė located on the right bank of the Vokė River, approximately one kilometre from the village of Vaidotai. Like Vaidotai, this village is partially within the city limits of Vilnius. The Saint Petersburg–Warsaw railway line passes through the village, with the Baltoji Vokė Railway Bridge crossing the river. According to the 2011 census, the town has a population of 369 people.

== Etymology ==
The village derives its name from the Vokė River, which is itself a hydronym. As several settlements developed along the Vokė and adopted the river's name, certain prefixes, such as Mūrinė Vokė, Juodoji Vokė, and so forth, were subsequently incorporated into their names to differentiate between them.

According to folk etymology, centuries ago, six sisters lived on the banks of the Vokė River. Each sister was also named Vokė. One day, they decided to seek happiness and settled separately. This legend is the origin of the names of the six villages that were established in the area: Juodoji Vokė, Trakų Vokė, Kauno Vokė, Mūrinė Vokė and Baltoji Vokė.

In other languages, Baltoji Vokė is referred to as: Polish: Biała Waka.

== History ==
In the early days, there was a tavern and a village near the bridge over the Vokė River. In 1758, the village had 10 inhabitants. In 1873 Baltoji Vokė Manor was built in the village.

During the German occupation of Lithuania during World War II, a forced labor camp for Jews was located here, approximately 11 kilometers from Vilnius.

The Vilnius Agroecology Training Centre was relocated from Buivydiškės in 1962 to Baltoji Vokė, and is currently operating in the premises of the former Baltoji Vokė Manor.
