= Nemėžis Eldership =

Nemėžis Eldership Nemėžio seniūnija
- Eldership
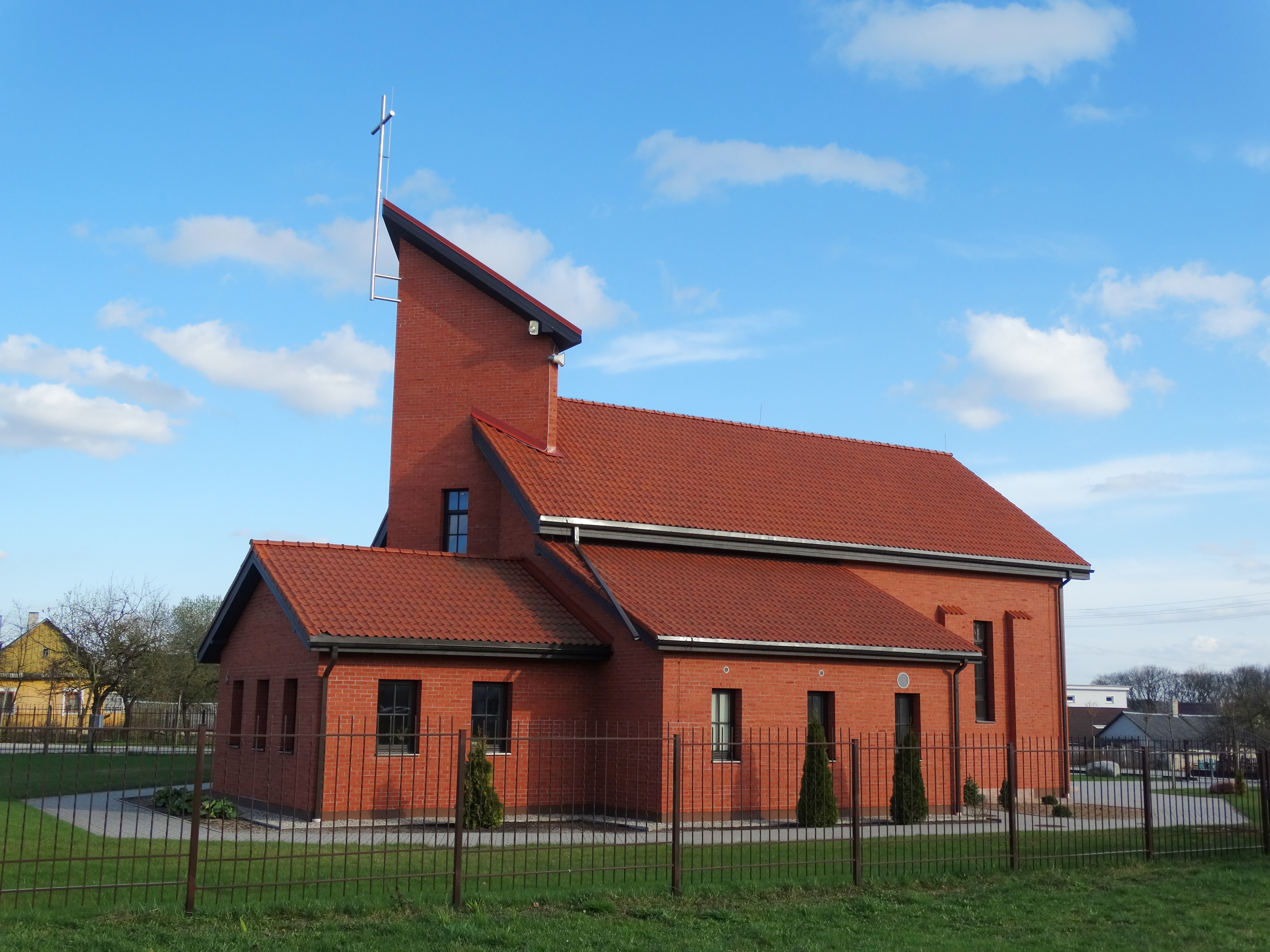

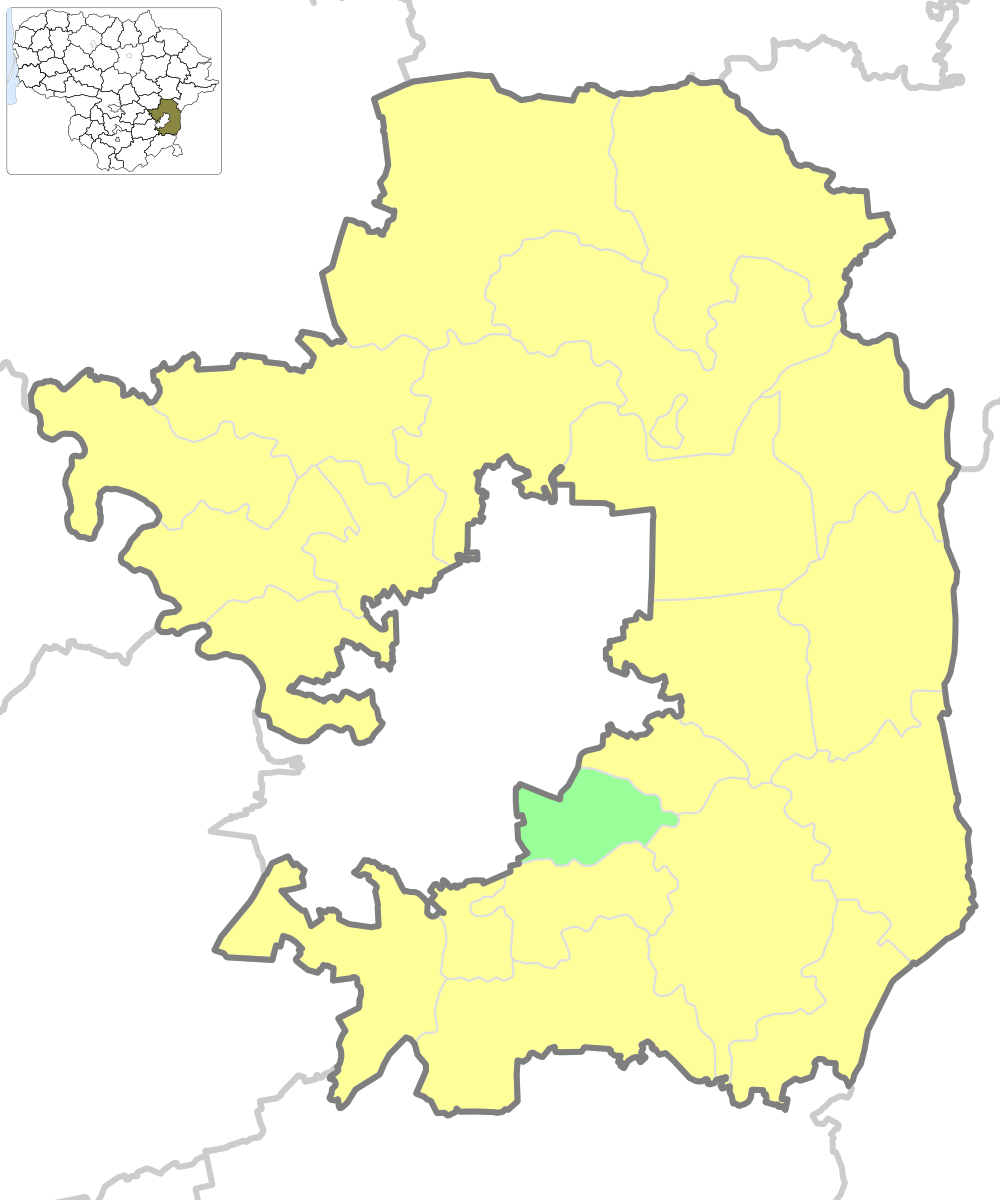
- Location of Nemėžis Eldership
- Country: Lithuania
- Ethnographic region: Dzūkija
- County: Vilnius County
- Municipality: Vilnius District Municipality
- Administrative centre: Nemėžis

Area
  - Total: 40 km^{2} (15 sq mi)

Population
  - Total: 8,950
  - Density: 220/km^{2} (580/sq mi)
- Time zone: UTC+2 (EET)
  - Summer (DST): UTC+3 (EEST)
- Website: https://www.vrsa.lt

Nemėžis Eldership (Lithuanian: Nemėžio seniūnija) is an eldership in Lithuania, located in Vilnius District Municipality, east of Vilnius.

== Ethnic composition ==
According to 2021 National Census data, the ethnic composition is as follows:

- Poles - 4477 (50.0%)
- Lithuanians - 2604 (29.1%)
- Russians - 899 (10.0%)
- Belarusians - 429 (4.8%)
- Ukrainians - 119 (1.3%)
- Other - 322 (3.6%)
