= Keturiasdešimt Totorių =

- Village
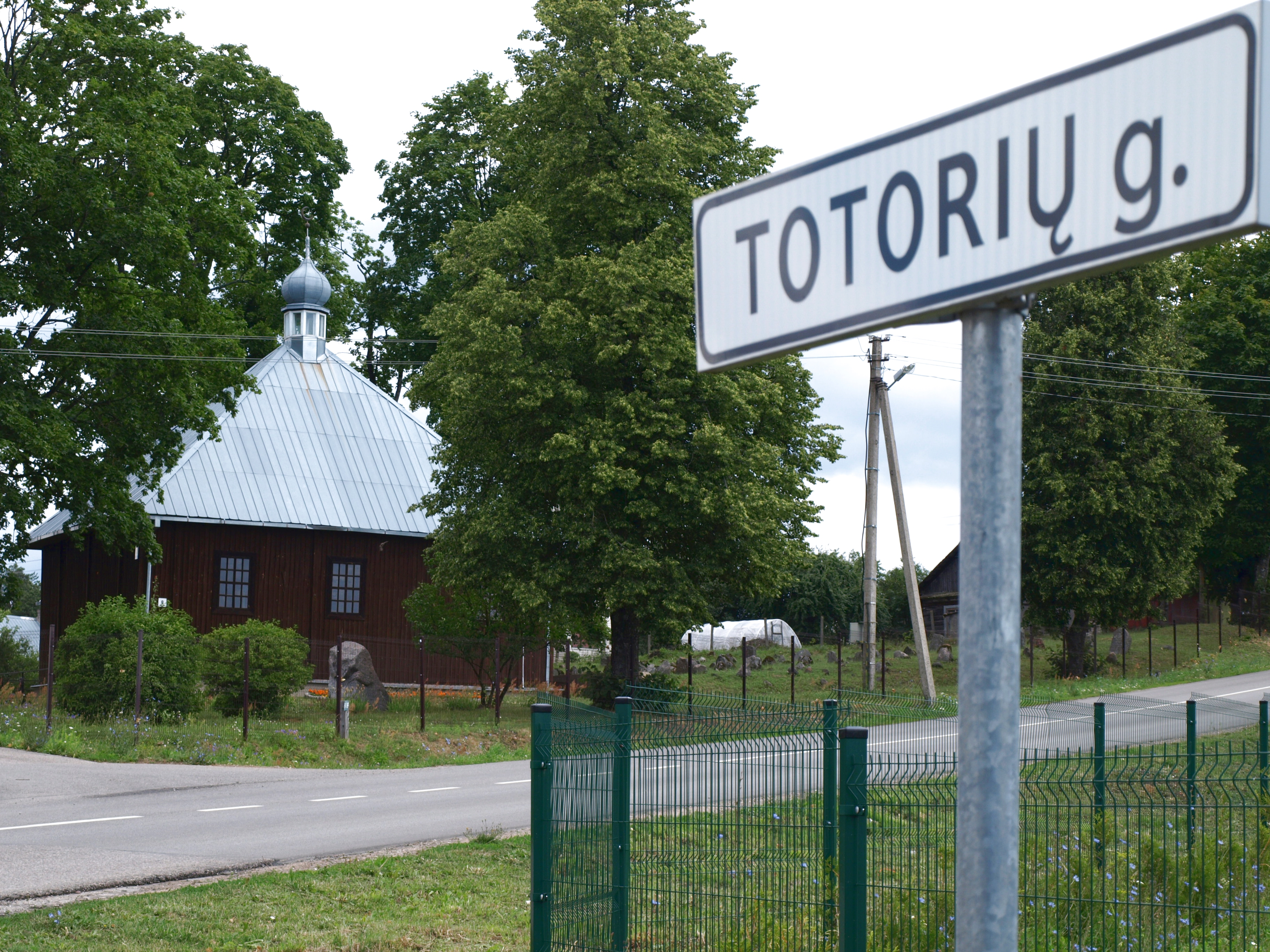
- Tatar Mosque and Tatar street sign in Keturiasdešimt Totorių village

- Location of Keturiasdešimt Totorių
- Coordinates: 54°33′40″N 25°10′01″E
- Country: Lithuania
- County: Vilnius County
- Municipality: Vilnius District Municipality
- Eldership: Pagiriai eldership

Population (2011)
  - Total: 451
- Time zone: UTC+2 (EET)
  - Summer (DST): UTC+3 (EEST)

Keturiasdešimt Totorių (lit. 'Forty Tatars'; Tatar: Кырык Татар, Qırıq Tatar) is a village in Vilnius District Municipality, Pagiriai Eldership, Lithuania. According to the 2011 census, it had population of 451. There is a wooden mosque, built in 1815, three historic Tatar cemeteries and Tatar community center in the village.

== History ==
Keturiasdešimt Totorių is one of the oldest Lithuanian Tatars settlements in the Grand Duchy of Lithuania. After a successful military campaign to Crimean Peninsula in 1397, Vytautas brought the first Tatar prisoners of war to Trakai and various places in the Duchy of Trakai, including localities near Vokė river just south of Vilnius. The first mosque in this village was mentioned for the first time in 1558. It was burnt down during Napoleonic wars. There were 42 Tatar families in the village in 1630. As of 2016, there are around 120 Tatars living in this village. The rest of the population are Lithuanians, Poles, Russians and others. Around a third of the population are Muslim. The other localities in Vilnius district municipality with sizeable Lithuanian Tatars presence are Nemėžis and Pagiriai.

In 2019, a book The Village of Forty Tatars – Between History and the Present was published.

== Name meaning ==
According to a legend, which explains the name of this village, Vytautas granted Tatars the privilege of keeping their religion and customs, including the customary polygamy. One Tatar man had four wives and every wife gave birth to ten sons, thus the name of the village – "Forty Tatars".
