= Wall of Kaunas =

Coordinates: 54°53′48″N 23°54′18″E

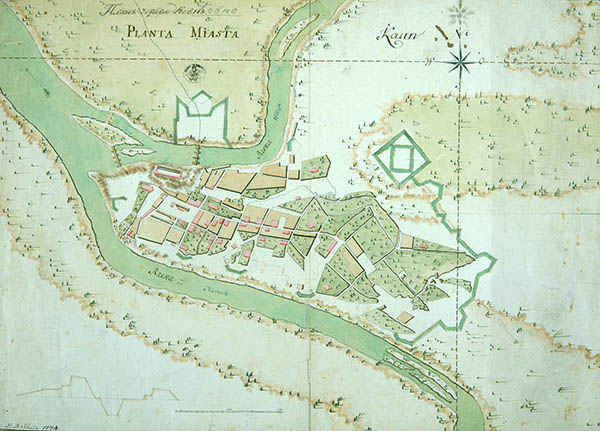
City plan of Kaunas in 1774

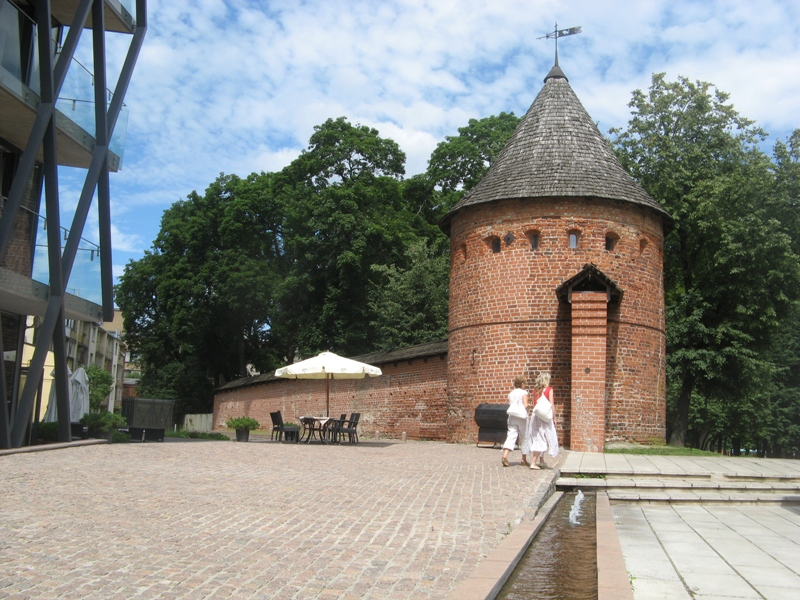
Authentic surviving fragment of the Kaunas city wall

The Kaunas city wall (Lithuanian: Kauno miesto gynybinė siena) was a masonry defensive wall in Kaunas, an important city of the Grand Duchy of Lithuania. Its construction began in the early 17th century as a result of Kaunas' prosperity and medieval city's standards, however it was unfinished due to later wars and economic reasons.

The city wall surrounded Kaunas from the eastern side and had land fortifications: bastions, redans, artillery batteries, fortified towers. In 1607 multiple gates of the city wall were mentioned named after Neris river (on a road to Ukmergė; later renamed to Panerių or Raginės after the name of the suburb), Lithuania's capital Vilnius, and Tatars which were built along the main roads of the city.

A small part of the city wall with a tower is preserved in the courtyard of the Kaunas State Musical Theatre.
