= Baltoji Vokė Manor =

Coordinates: 54°35′54″N 25°11′23″E

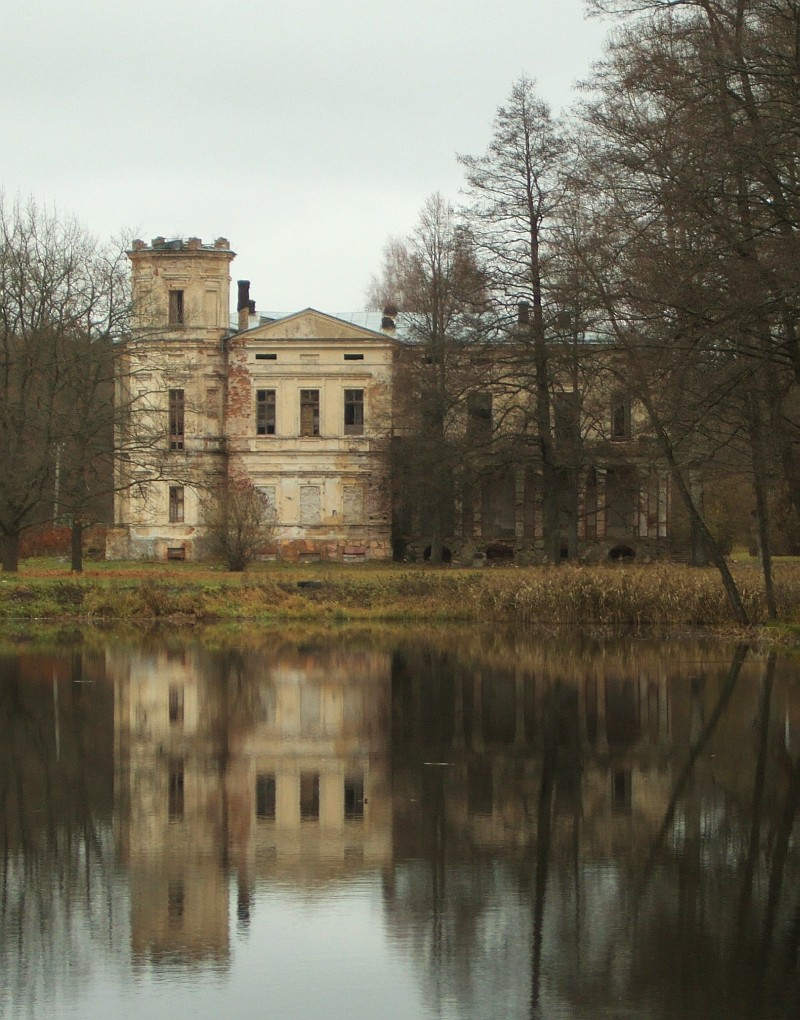
Baltoji Vokė Manor, in 2011.

Baltoji Vokė Manor (Lit.: Baltosios Vokės dvaras, Polish: Pałac Biała Waka is a former Łęski family residential manor in Baltoji Vokė, village of the Vilnius district, in Lithuania.

The first known owner of the manor was Antoni Oskierka (also known as Antoni Oskierko, Lit.: Antanas Oskierka; 1670–1734), Grand Scribe of Lithuania. In 1838, the property was bought by Aleksander Łęski. The current palace (1873) was built in Neoclassical architectural style by Count Hilary Łęski (1834–1920), then owner of the property. He was also the founder of the Vaidotai Catholic church of the Conversion of St Paul the Apostle. After Hilary's death, the manor was inherited by his son Włodzimierz Łęski (1879–1941) while Vilnius and its surroundings were being disputed between Lithuania, Poland and the USSR. During Soviet Union|Soviet occupation, Włodzimierz Łęski was arrested and taken to Siberia, where he died. His wife, Maria Olga Broel-Plater Łęska and daughters Krystyna and Maria Teresa managed to escape exile. They left nowadays' Lithuania and settled in nowadays' Poland

== See also ==
- Manors in Lithuania
- Neoclassical architecture in Lithuania

== Gallery ==
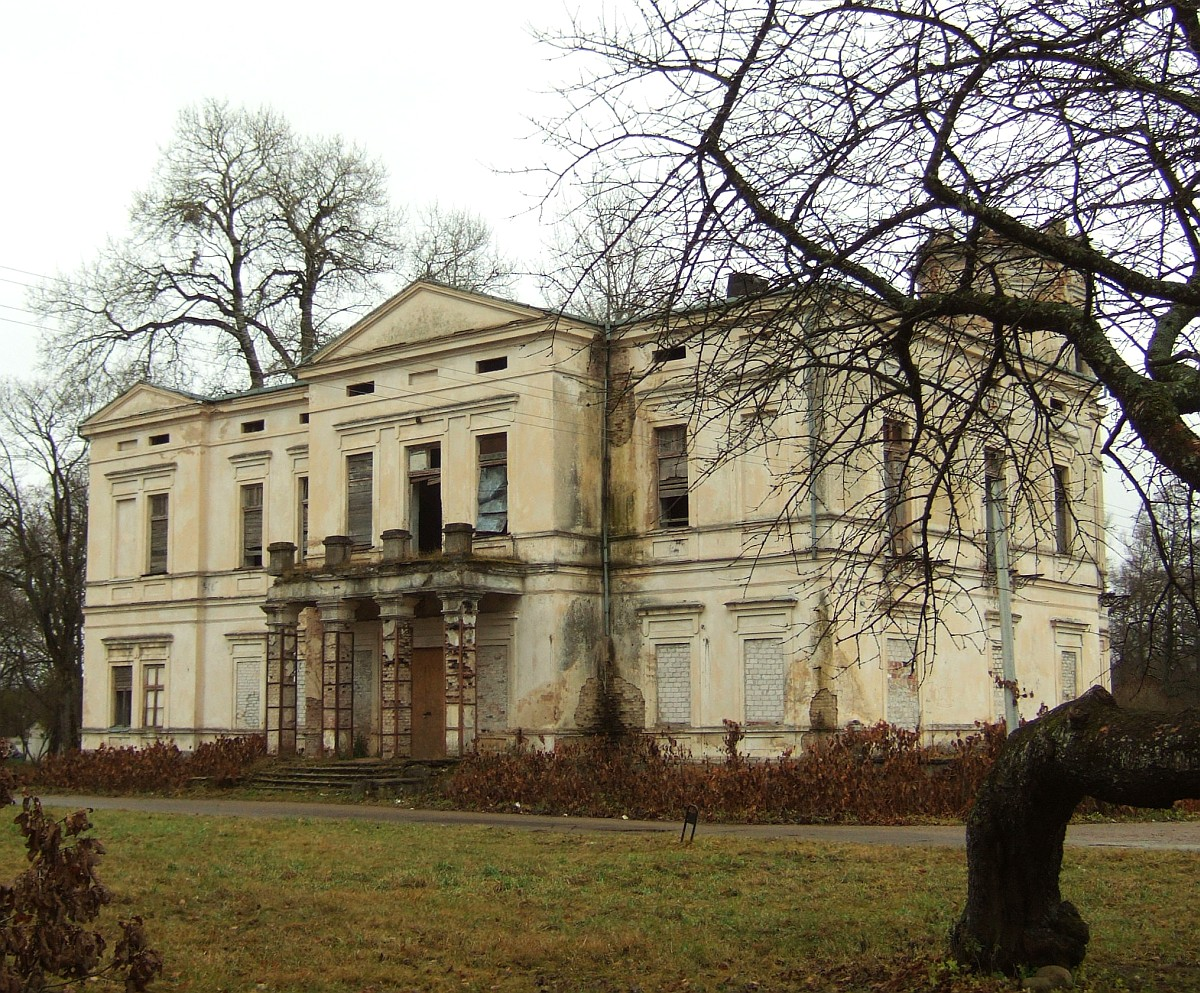
Main facade of manor house

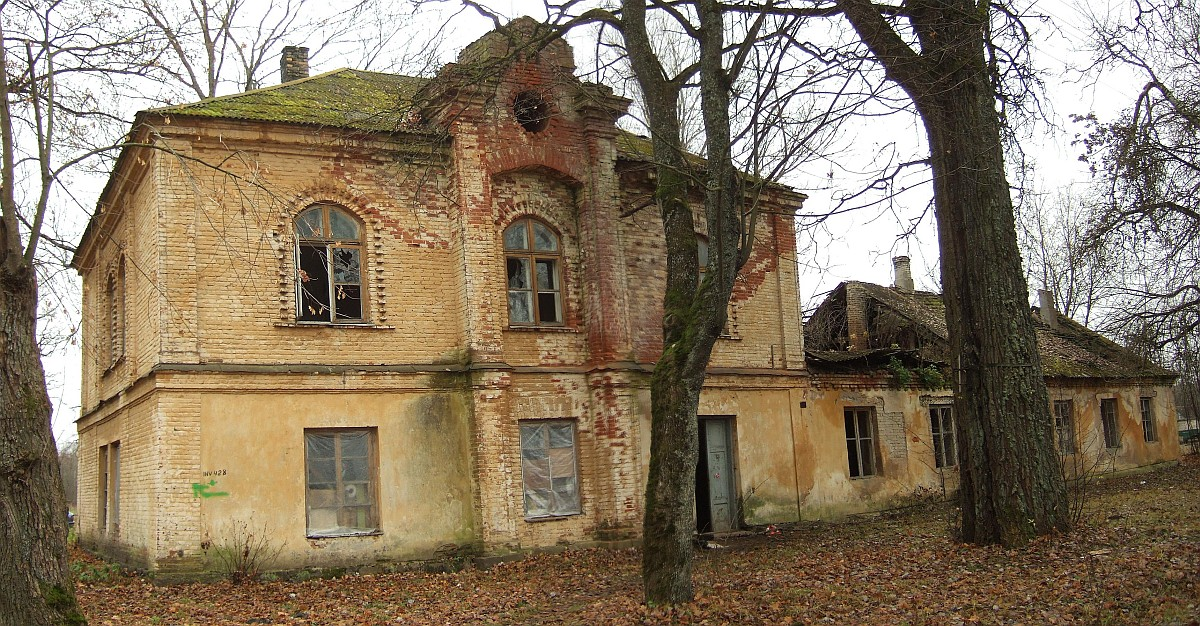
Estate office house

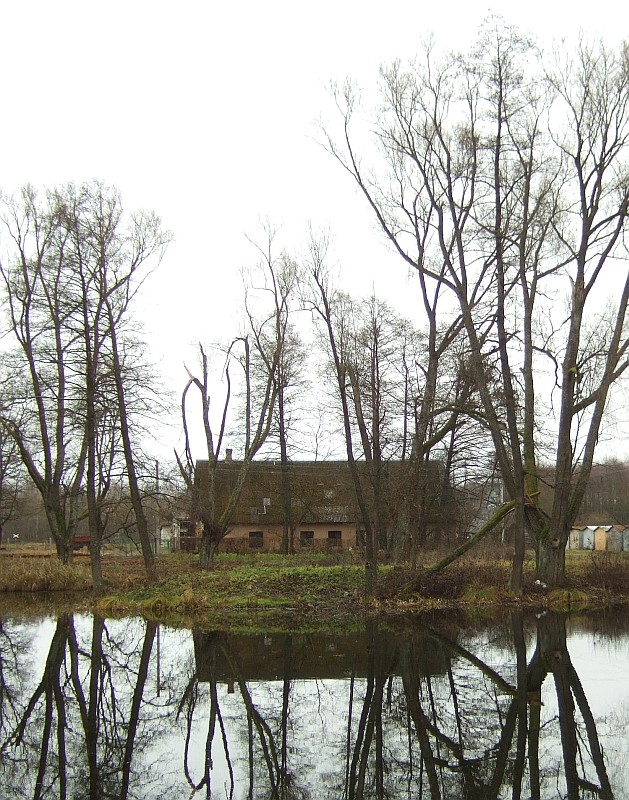
Pond with outbuilding

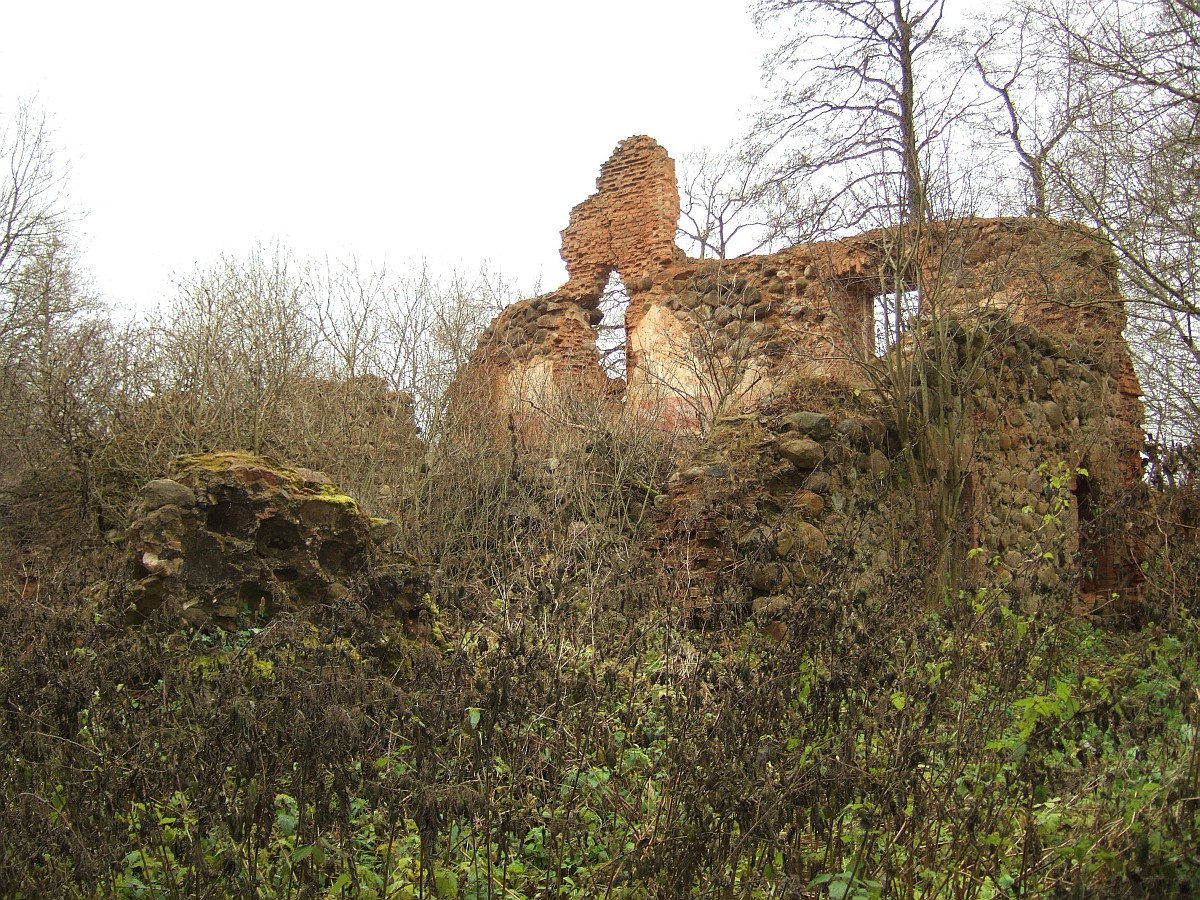
Estate outbuilding in ruins
