= Tatars in Lithuania =

Ethnic group

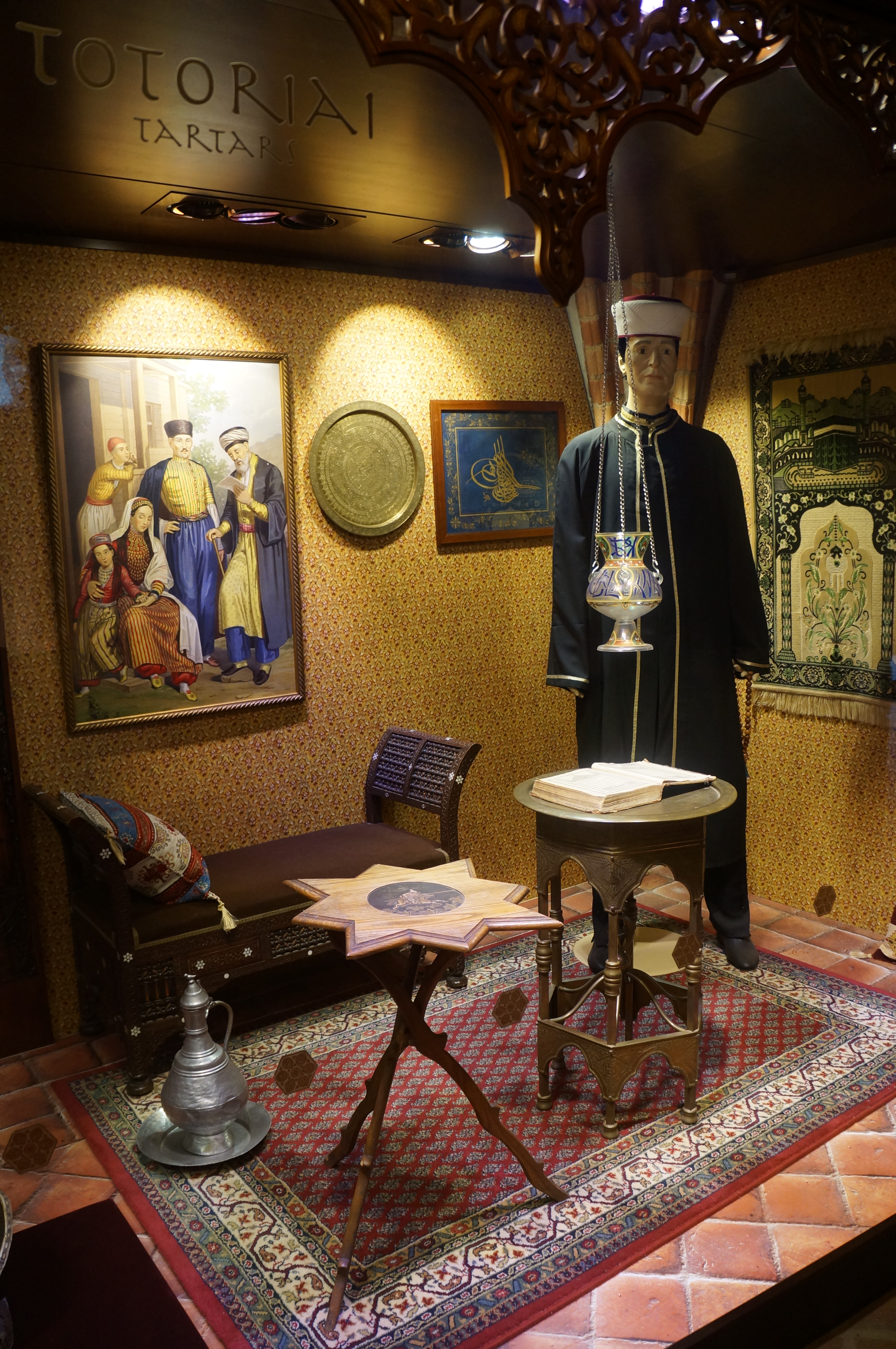
Tartar exposition in the Trakai castle

Tatar population in Lithuania (Lithuanian: Lietuvos totoriai) is an ethnic group living in the Republic of Lithuania historical lands of Lithuania. The Tatars are considered one of the oldest ethnic minorities in Lithuania.

== Origin ==
Lithuanian Tatars are descendants of various Turkic tribes. Their ancestors were emigrants from the Golden Horde and the Great Horde (the lower Volga region), as well as the Crimean Khanate. Tatars belonged to different ethnic groups and spoke the Kipchak languages. The Tatar population in Lithuania lives surrounded by other nations and religions. They lost their native language in the 16th century, but continued to use Arabic script for religious texts. However, Tatars have preserved their ethnic culture, national and religious identity. The majority of Lithuanian Tatars are Sunni Muslims. The Muslim Spiritual Center of Lithuania, or the Muftiate, was re-established in 1998. Lithuanian Tatar mosques operate in Nemėžis, the village of Keturiasdešimt Totorių, Raižiai and Kaunas. There were six mosques in Lithuania before the war. Two of them have been destroyed. The mosque in Vinkšnupiai, in Vilkaviškis county, was destroyed during the Second World War, while the Lukiškės mosque in Vilnius was destroyed in the Soviet era. It is believed that there were about 60 Lithuanian Tatar mosques or houses of worship at various times in the Grand Duchy of Lithuania.

== Entry into the Territory of Lithuania ==
In the 14th century, the Grand Duchy of Lithuania covered vast territories. In the east, it was bordered by the Tatar lands. The two nations communicated with each other through the Khans’ messengers who would travel to the then capital of Trakai. The first Tatars came to the Grand Duchy of Lithuania as allies in the battles against the crusaders already during the rule of the Grand Duke Gediminas in 1319-1320.

Vytautas the Great took the first Tatars to the Grand Duchy of Lithuania after the campaigns in 1397-1398 to the Dnieper and Don steppes together with Khan Tokhtamysh, who tried to regain his Khanate of the Golden Horde with the Lithuanian aid. The Tatars then settled in Trakai and its surroundings. The earliest settlements spread along the Vokė River.

On 15 July 1410, a contingent of Tatars participated in the famous Battle of Grunwald together with the Grand Duke Vytautas.

After the Battle of Kletsk in 1506, a number of Tatar captives settled in private estates, towns, or villages of Lithuanian noble families, such as the Princes Ostrogski, the Radziwiłłs, and others. In the 17th century, some Tatar settlements were formed in the Duchy of Biržai. The last Khan of the Great Horde (the lower Volga region) Sheikh Ahmed was taken hostage and held for diplomatic purposes in the Grand Duchy of Lithuania with a considerable escort for 20 years. He was released in 1527, but members of his family remained in the Grand Duchy of Lithuania and became founders of several local families of Tatar Dukes and Mirzas. In Lukiškės - the suburb of Vilnius - Tatars settled not earlier than in the middle of the 16th century.

In Lithuania, the Tatar nobility lived mainly in manor-villages (okolicas) or homesteads. Tatars, who belonged to the Grand Duke Lithuania, received lands from him by inheritance. Tatars were obliged to perform military service and had some additional obligations. They also served as couriers, postmen, guardsmen, and road-workers. Noble Tatars generally retained the right to own land, but they had no political rights.

Tatars were exempt from state taxes, because they performed military service in exchange for the lands they held. Those who did not perform military service had to pay a poll tax and other taxes when the state needed it. Land and estates were granted to individuals for good service.

In the Grand Duchy of Lithuania, the main activity of Tatars was serving in the military and diplomatic service. The flag was an administrative territorial and tax unit of the Tatar community. It was headed by the Duke (Ulan). Initially, Tatar flags were also military units that later formed the Front Guard Regiments of the Grand Duchy of Lithuania.

In the urban areas, commoner Tatars were involved in gardening, leather production, horse breeding, and transportation.

Tatars retained their rights after the Third Partition of the Polish-Lithuanian Commonwealth in 1795, when the lands of the GDL became part of the Russian Empire. Having proved their nobility, Tatars served in the military service and administration. Those, who could not prove their nobility, made a living on homesteads and paid a poll tax.

Tatars served in the Russian Imperial Army and until 1803 there was a separate Lithuanian Tatar regiment. A number of Tatars participated in the French invasion of Russia in 1812, the uprisings of 1831 and 1863, and supported Lithuania's National Liberation Movement.

From the end of the 17th century until the middle of the 20th century, up to 50 Generals of the Lithuanian Tatar descent served in the armies of the Grand Duchy of Lithuania, the Kingdom of Poland, and the Russian Empire.

While maintaining loyalty to the country that became their second homeland, Lithuanian Tatars participated in all the wars of the Grand Duchy of Lithuania and the uprisings of 1794, 1831 and 1864, and Lithuanian struggles for independence in 1918-1920. The high-ranking Lithuanian Tatar officer Colonel Aleksandras (Suleimanas) Chaleckis was among the founders of the restored Lithuanian Armed Forces.

== Twentieth century ==
Over time, new professions opened up to Lithuanian Tatars. From the end of the 19th century to the beginning of the 20th century, there were Tatar doctors, scholars, artists and practitioners of the liberal arts. Some of them have become world-famous.

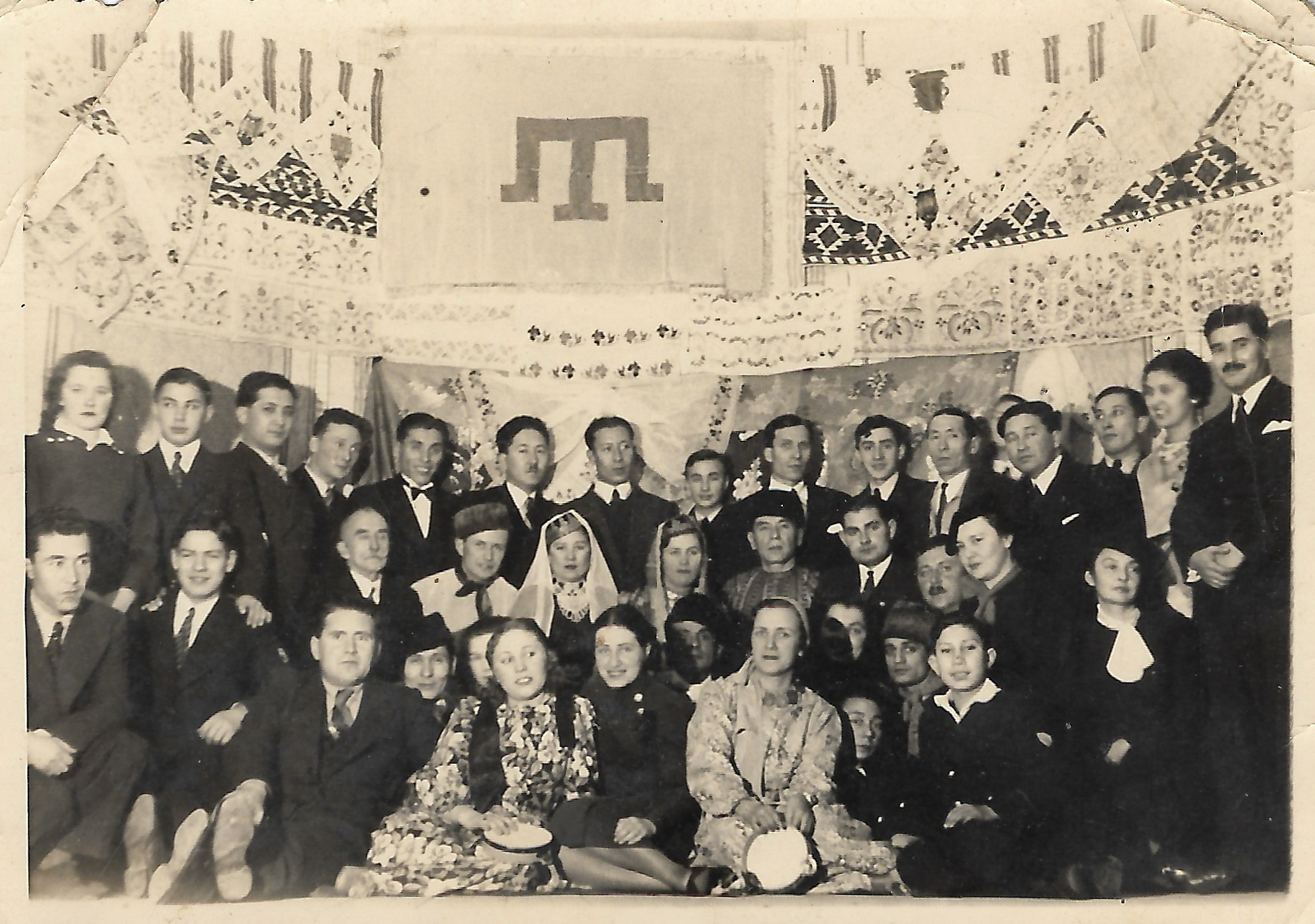
Crimean Tatar Colony in 1930s. Among them are activists Mustafa Edige Kırımal, Abdullah Zihni Soysal, Müstecip Ülküsal

In the early 20th century, Tatar national organisations began to be established. In 1909, the Muslims' community of Lithuania was established in Vilnius. In 1917-1923, the Tatar Union of Poland, Lithuania, Belarus and Ukraine operated in Petrograd. From 1923 to 1936, there was the Kaunas Tatar Society of Lithuania. A Division of the Cultural and Educational Union of Polish Tatars, which operated in Poland's occupied eastern Lithuania in 1925-1940, published scientific, religious literature and fiction, and the newspaper „Życie tatarskie“ was printed in Vilnius in 1934-1939. In 1929-1940, there was the Tatar National Museum, from 1931 – an archive, and from 1934 – a Youth Circle.

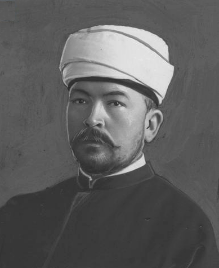
Mufti Dr. Jakub Szynkiewicz

A Muslim religious center – the Vilnius Muftiate (headed by the Mufti Jokūbas Šinkevičius) – was founded on 28 December 1925. In 1936, the Tatar community was recognized as an autocephalous faith community. In addition, a Tatar military unit was established as part of the 13th Vilnius Uhlan Regiment. During the interwar period, about a thousand Lithuanian Tatars lived in Lithuania. Another ten thousand members of this community lived outside Lithuania, in Poland and Belarus. In Lithuania, there were two Muslim parishes with centers in Kaunas and Raižiai. In 1930, on the occasion of the 520th anniversary of the Battle of Grunwald, a new brick mosque was opened in Kaunas, the temporary capital of Lithuania. It received significant support from the then Lithuanian Government.

At the end of 1939, there were Muslim parishes in Raižiai (Alytus county), Vinkšnupiai (Vilkaviškis county), the village of Forty Tatars (Vilnius county) and Nemėžis (Vilnius county). After the Red Army invaded Lithuania on 15 June 1940, Tatar organisations were closed down.

== In contemporary Lithuania ==
The Lithuanian Tatar Culture Society was established in 1988. Its goal was to coordinate the social life of Tatars in Lithuania, to restore the houses of worship, and to foster the Tatar culture. There are now about 20 public organisations (associations) of Lithuanian Tatars in Lithuania.

In 1995, the newspaper “Lithuanian Tatars” appeared in the Lithuanian, Russian, and Polish languages.

The Union of Lithuanian Tatar Communities was founded in 1996. Its activities include fostering, studying, and disseminating information about the Lithuanian Tatar culture. The Union organises events and maintains ties with state and municipal institutions, as well as related organisations of Lithuanian Tatars in Poland and Belarus, and the Mejlis of the Crimean Tatar People (the national parliament).

In 2009, the Vytautas the Great Monument Construction Foundation was established, which aims to perpetuate the historical memory and to preserve the cultural heritage.

There are also several Sunday schools in Lithuania.

The restoration of the Lithuanian Tatar folklore began with the establishment of the first folklore ensemble “Alije” in 1997. In 2011, the Lithuanian Tatar folklore ensemble “Ilsu” (Homeland) was established in Vilnius. The folklore group "Efsane" (Legend) was founded in 2018. They promote and present to the public the traditional culture of Lithuanian Tatars and other Turkic peoples.

The Trakai Castle Museum's permanent exhibition also presents the history of Lithuanian Tatars.

== Culinary heritage ==
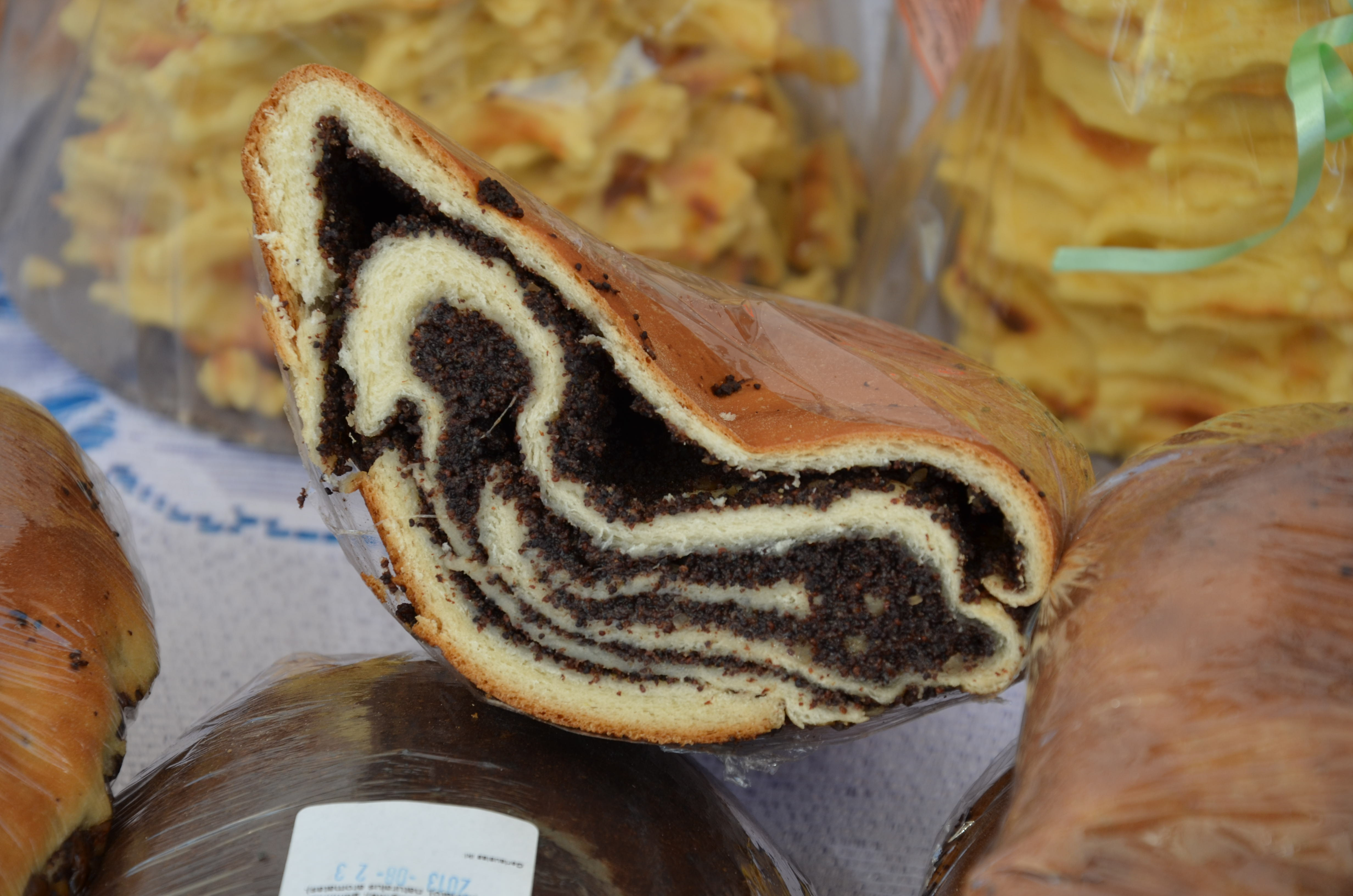

Lithuanian Tatars have preserved their food traditions. The most famous Tatar dish in Lithuania and beyond is a hundred layer cake with poppy filling “Šimtalapis”. There are also well-known Lithuanian Tatar dumplings with mutton and beef, pumpkin pie with meat (traditionally with geese), ceremonial round scones - jama - and sweet halwa.

== Famous Lithuanian Tatars ==
- Maciej Sulkiewicz, Lieutenant General of the Russian Empire, Prime Minister of the Crimean Regional Government, and Chief of the General Staff of the Azerbaijani Armed Forces
- Mikhail Tugan-Baranovsky, world-famous political economy theorist and Professor
- Brothers Olgierdas and Leonas Kričinskiai (Olgierd Najman-Mirza Kryczyński, Leon Najman Mirza Kryczyński), lawyers
- Adas Jakubauskas, political scientist, poet, Professor at Mykolas Romeris University, Director General of the Genocide and Resistance Research Centre of Lithuania
- Romualdas Makaveckas – Associate Professor at Kaunas University of Technology, Kaunas Chess Federation's Honorary President
- Tamara Bairašauskaitė, historian, Chief Researcher at the Lithuanian Institute of History, Professor at Vilnius University
- Juozas Vilčinskas, Chairman of the Lithuanian Community in Great Britain.
- Albertas Chazbijavičius, professional circus artist, Head of the circus studio Dzūkija.
- Charles Bronson, American actor. His father, Walter Buchinsky (né Vladislavas Valteris Paulius Bučinskas/Bučinskis), was a Lipka Tatar from Druskininkai in southern Lithuania.

== See also ==
- Lithuanian Tatars of the Imperial Guard
- Islam in Lithuania
