= Lithuania–Ukraine relations =

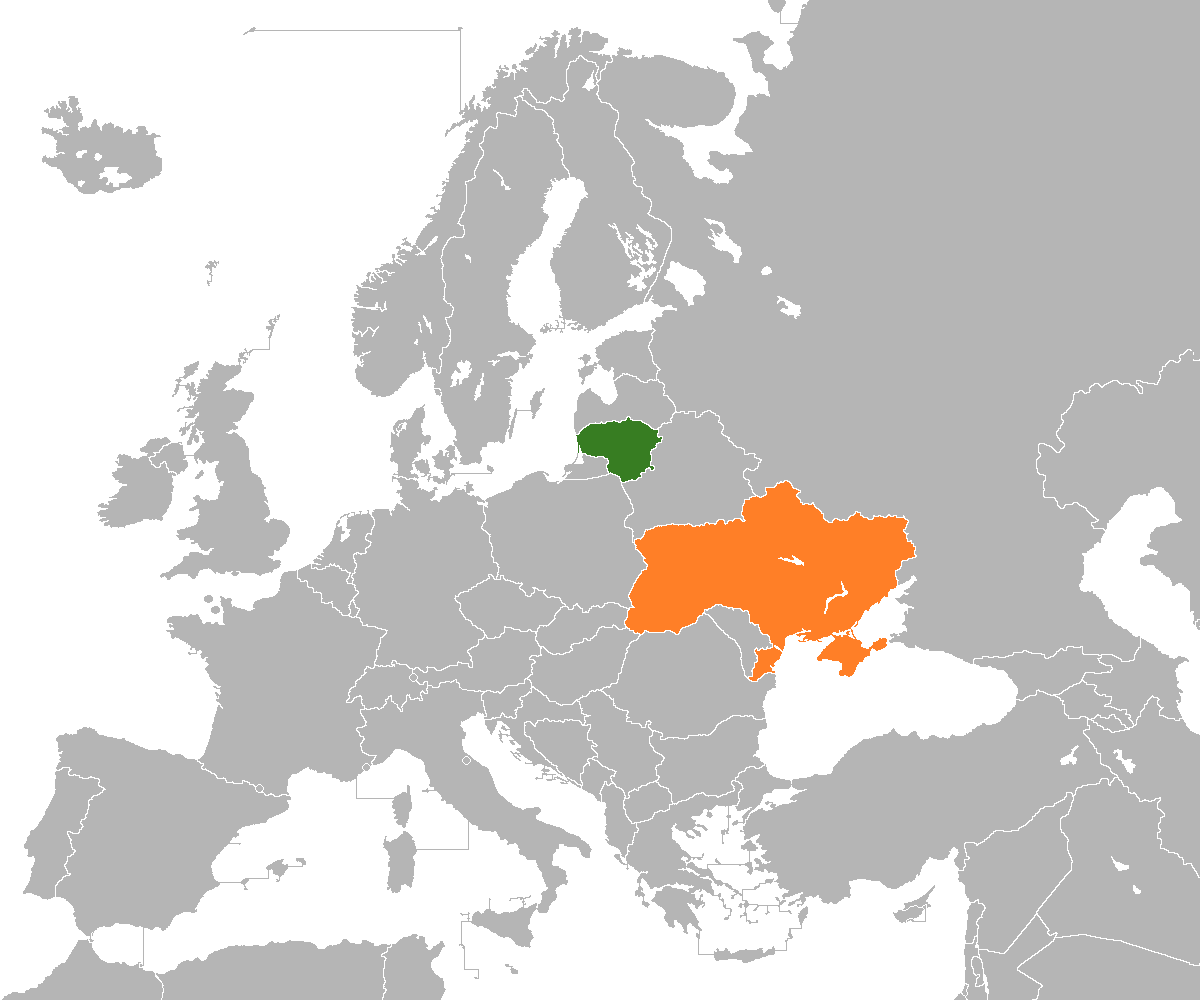

- Lithuania: Ukraine

Lithuania–Ukraine relations are foreign relations between Lithuania and Ukraine. Both countries are members of the Lublin Triangle, OSCE, Council of Europe, World Trade Organization and United Nations. Lithuania supports Ukraine's European Union and NATO membership. Lithuania has an embassy in Kyiv and Ukraine has an embassy in Vilnius.

== History ==
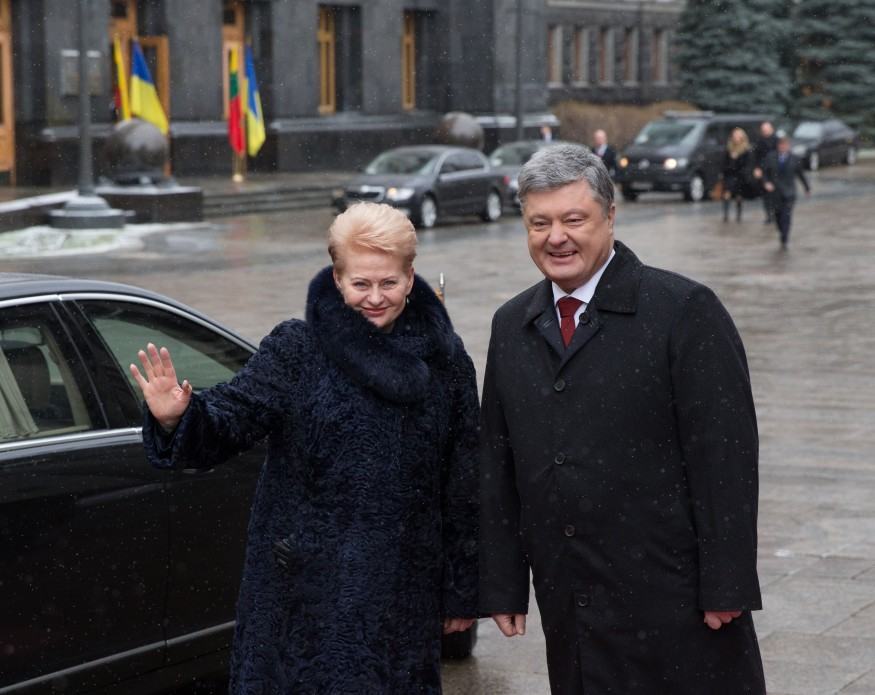
Grybauskaitė and Petro Poroshenko (December 2016)

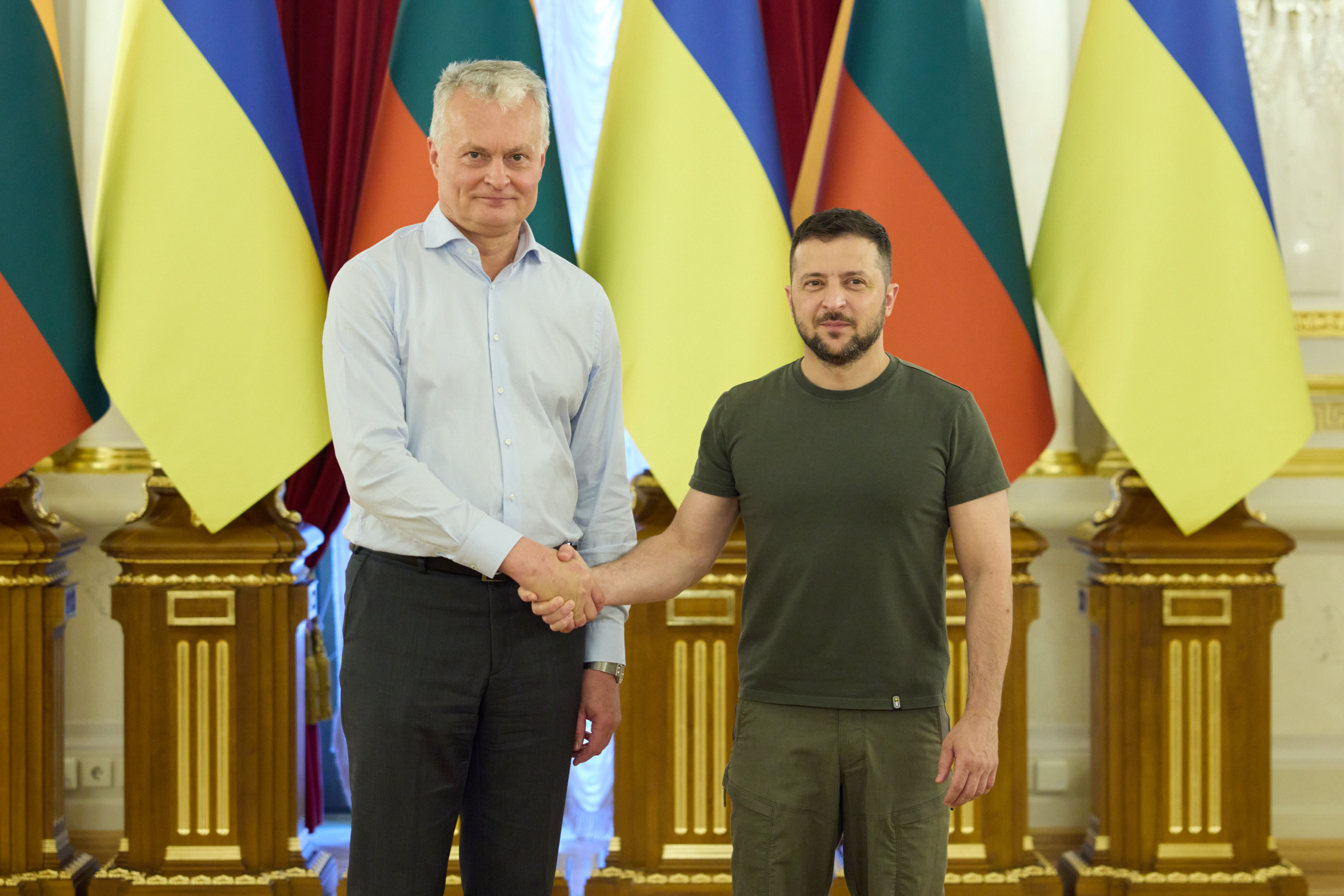
Gitanas Nausėda meets Volodymyr Zelenskyy during the Russian invasion of Ukraine

Ever since the rule of Gediminas in the 1300s much of present-day Ukraine was part of the Grand Duchy of Lithuania. After the Battle of Blue Waters in 1362, Lithuania took over the Principality of Kiev. Between 1569 and 1795 Poland and Lithuania formed the Polish–Lithuanian Commonwealth which incorporated much of what is now Ukraine. Following the partitions of Commonwealth, the bulk of Lithuania and present-day Ukraine fell to the Russian Empire. Both countries formed part of the USSR (Ukraine since 1922, Lithuania since 1944) until 1991.

A number of agreements were signed in November 2009 including the mutual recognition of university qualifications and cooperation in preserving cultural heritage; furthermore, Lithuania promised assistance to Ukraine in its aspirations to become a member of the European Union.

In 2014, the Lithuanian president Dalia Grybauskaitė voiced her support for Ukraine in the wake of the Russo-Ukrainian War. In January 2015, Lithuania requested a United Nations Security Council meeting due to the ongoing conflict in Eastern Ukraine. Later on, Vytautas Landsbergis declared that he believes the Minsk agreement to be "worse than Munich".

In 2021, the Ukrainian President Volodymyr Zelenskyy noted the importance of Lithuania's support for Ukraine's European Union and NATO aspirations, while the Lithuanian President Gitanas Nausėda noted that Lithuania supports Ukraine's progress and welcomes reforms in Ukraine.

=== Russian invasion of Ukraine ===
Following the start of the 2022 Russian invasion of Ukraine, Lithuania has strongly condemned the invasion and called for military, economic and humanitarian aid for Ukraine. In the prelude of invasion, on 13 February 2022, Lithuania sent FIM-92 Stinger anti-aircraft missile systems and ammunition to Ukraine. Military aid further continued and, according to the Lithuanian Minister of National Defence, as of 21 November 2022, the total aid to Ukraine amounted to €660 million, of which the military aid was €240 million.

In April 2024, the Lithuanian government considered repatriating Ukrainian men of military age living in Lithuania to Ukraine to be drafted into the Ukrainian army. Lithuanian President Gitanas Nausėda, Prime Minister Ingrida Šimonytė and Defence Minister Laurynas Kasčiūnas voiced support for the repatriation of military-age Ukrainian men to Ukraine.

== Overview ==
According to the 2016 census, 17,679 ethnic Ukrainians were living in Lithuania, mostly in Vilnius, Kaunas, Klaipėda, Šiauliai, Jonava, and Visaginas. Moreover, Lithuania is a popular destination for the Ukrainian migrants and over 21,800 Ukrainians have work-based residence permits. The Ukrainians evaluate Lithuania positively.

Over 7,000 ethnic Lithuanians are living in Ukraine and are represented by the Lithuanian community of Ukraine organization there. Lithuania consistently supports Ukraine in Russo-Ukrainian War. Lithuania has been a staunch supporter of Ukraine joining NATO.

== Gallery ==
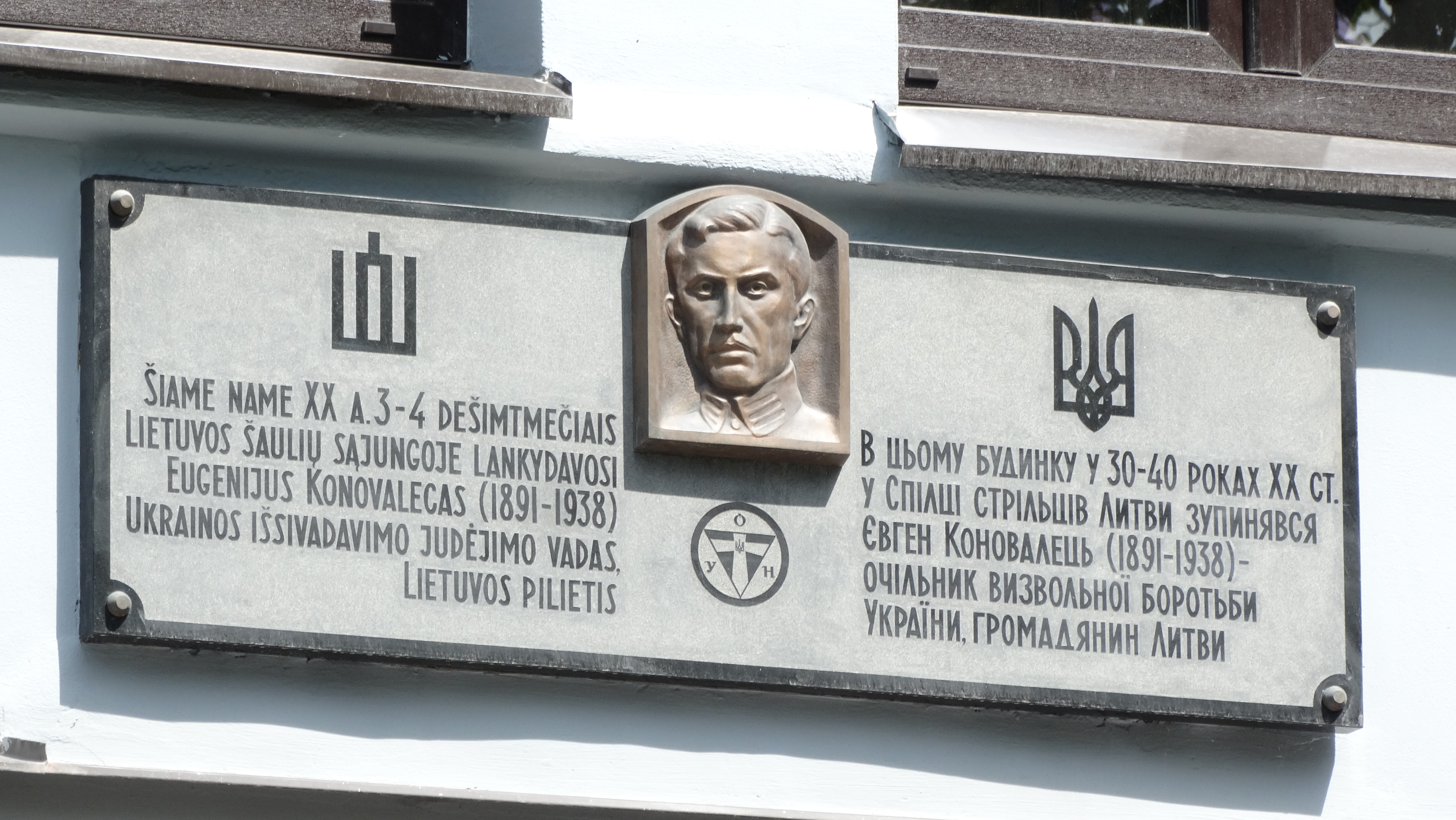
Memorial plaque to Yevhen Konovalets in Kaunas

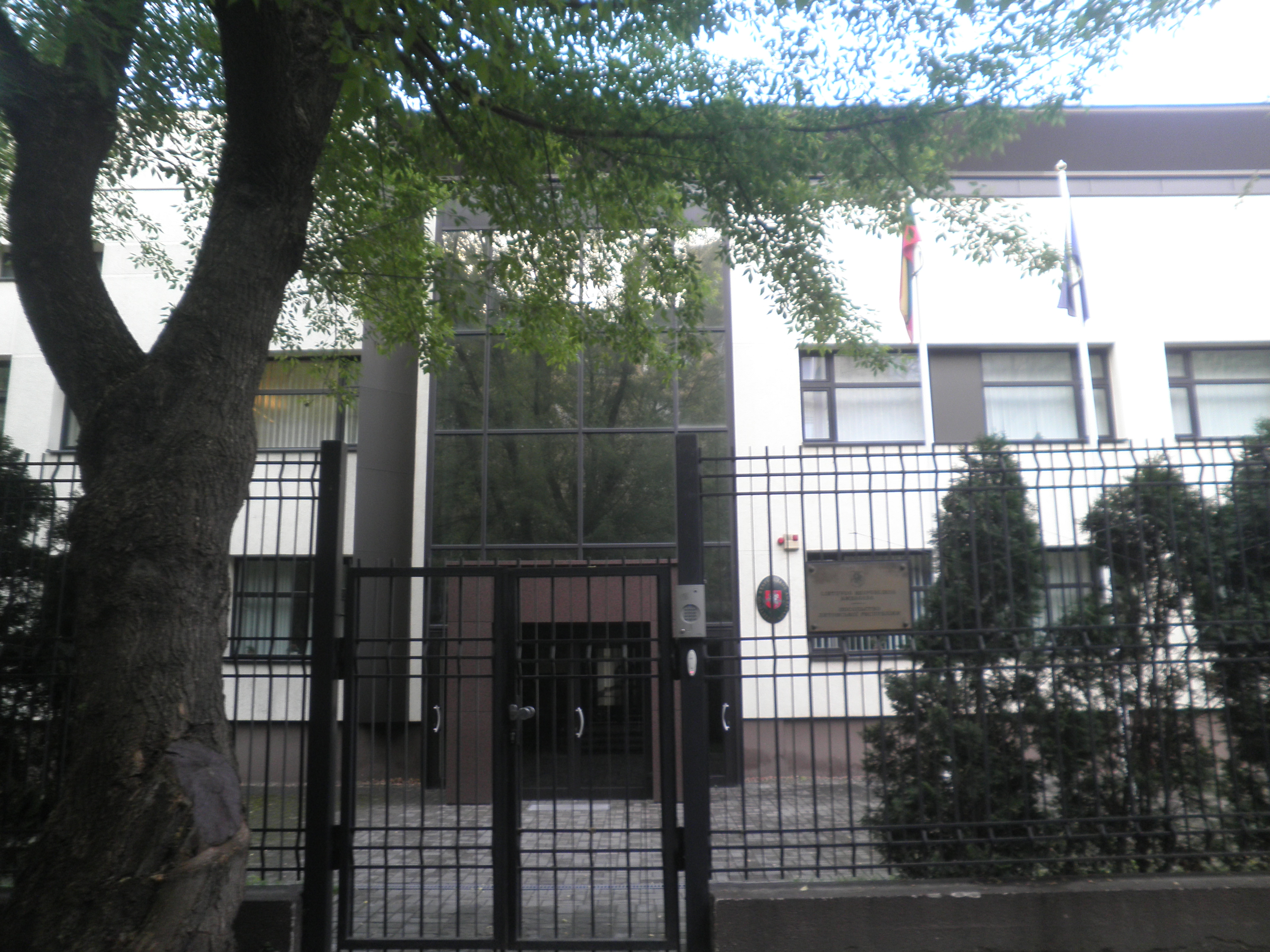
Embassy of Lithuania in Kyiv

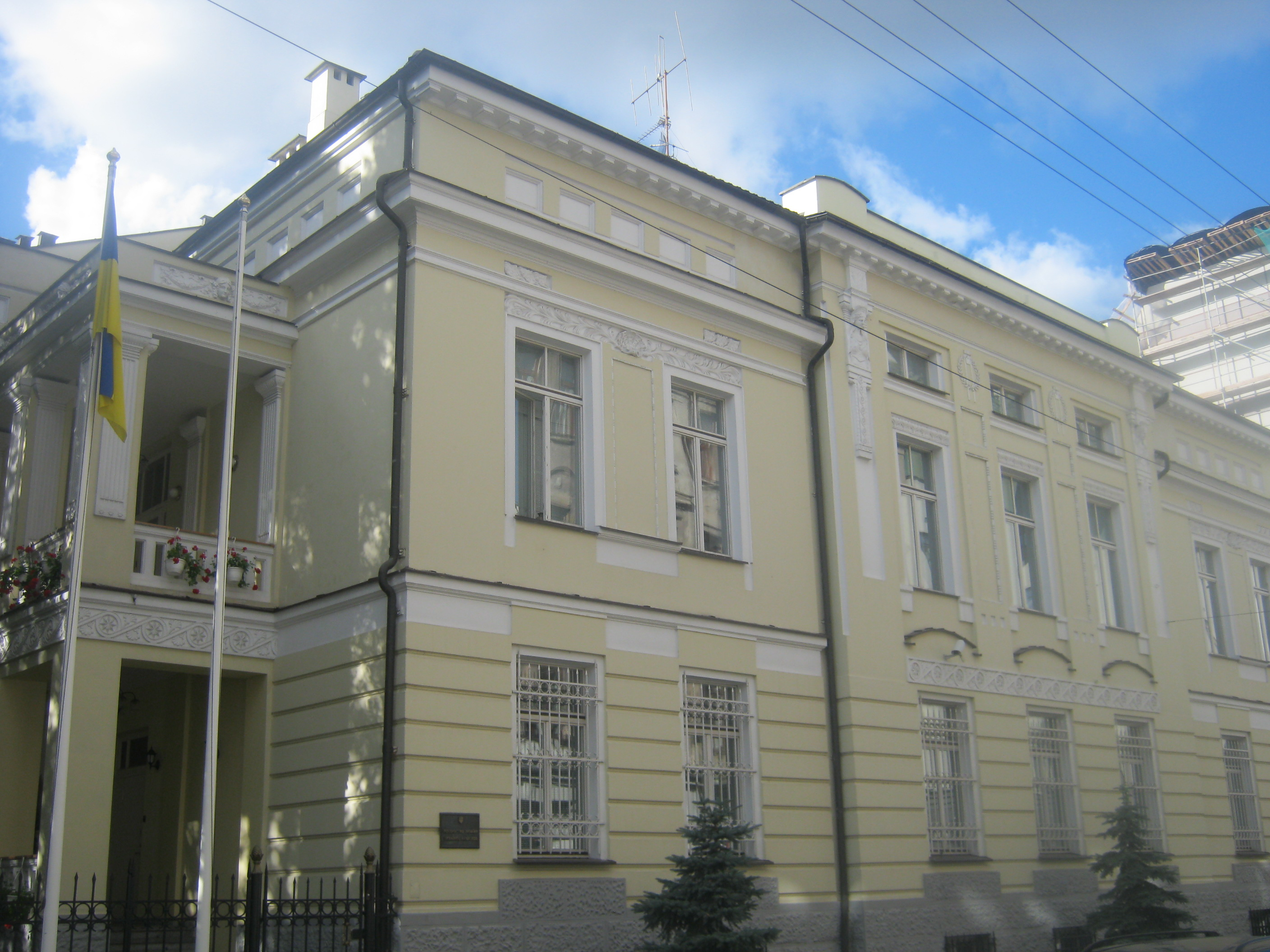
Embassy of Ukraine in Vilnius

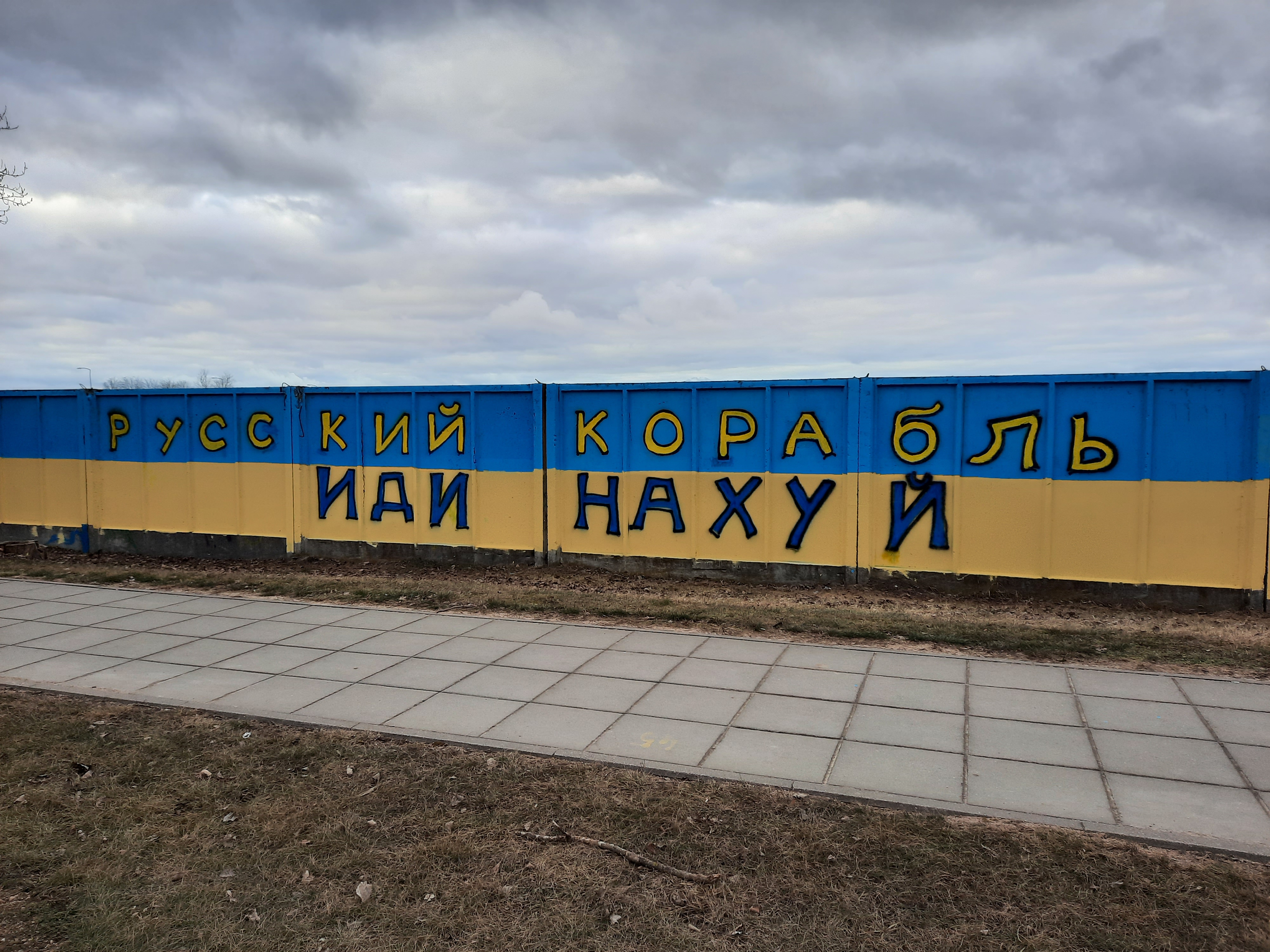
"Russian warship, go fuck yourself" graffiti supporting Ukraine in Kaunas

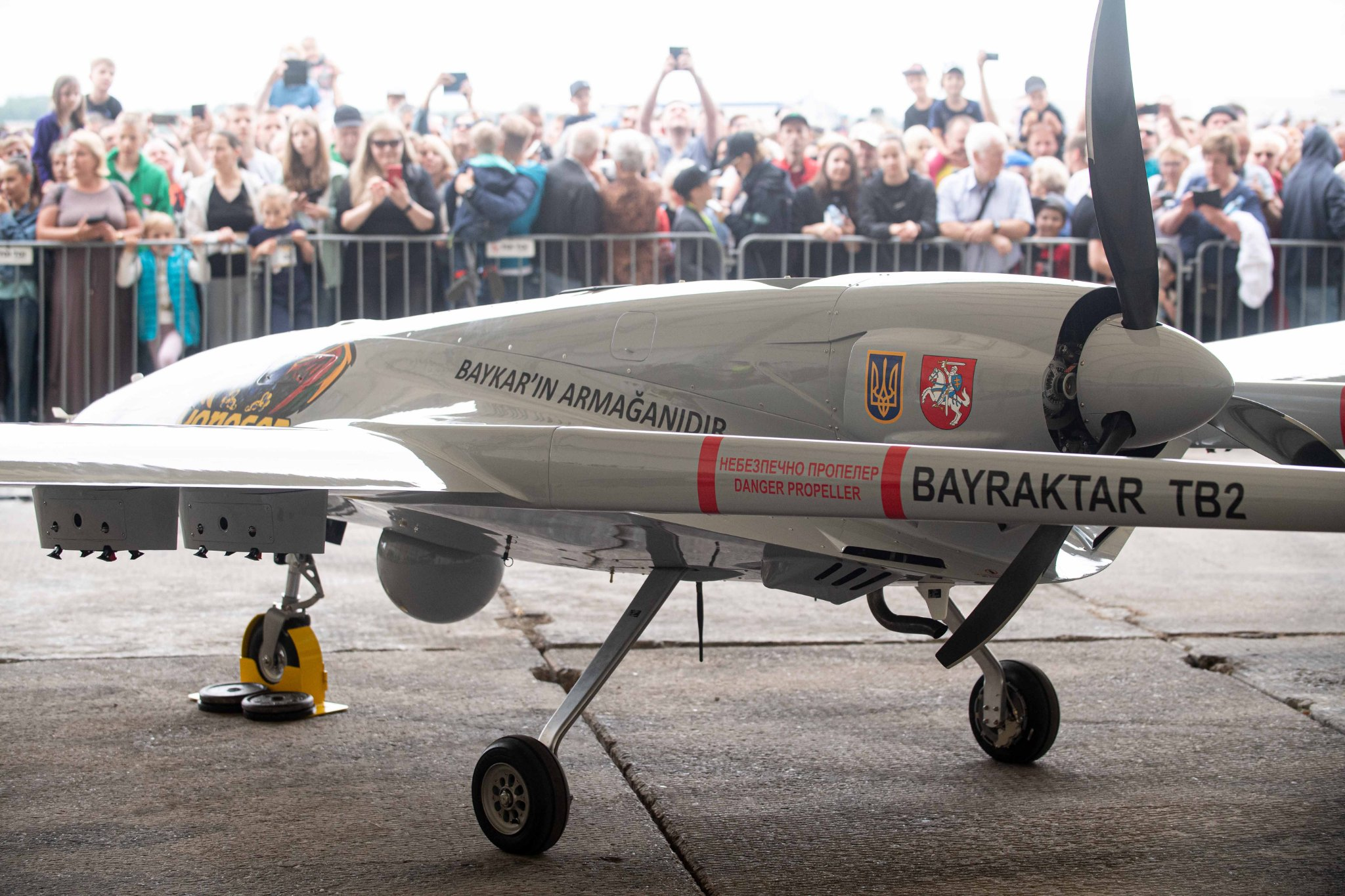
Bayraktar TB2 combat drone, crowdfunded for Ukraine by Lithuanians

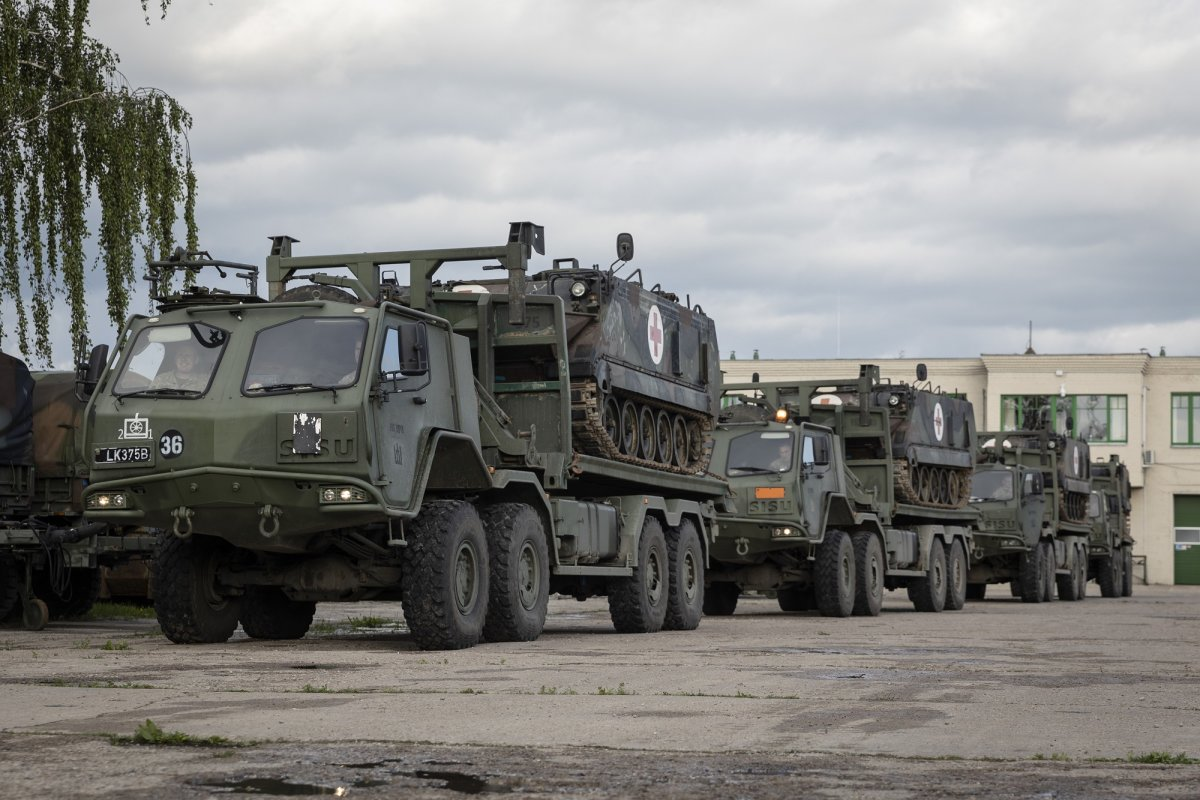
Lithuanian military aid package being sent to Ukraine, June 2022

== Resident diplomatic missions ==
- Lithuania has an embassy in Kyiv.
- Ukraine has an embassy in Vilnius.

== See also ==
- Embassy of Ukraine in Vilnius
- Foreign relations of Lithuania
- Foreign relations of Ukraine
- Ukrainians in Lithuania
- Lithuanians in Ukraine
- Ukraine–EU relations
  - Accession of Ukraine to the European Union
