= Nemėžis =

Nemėžis Niemież
- Village
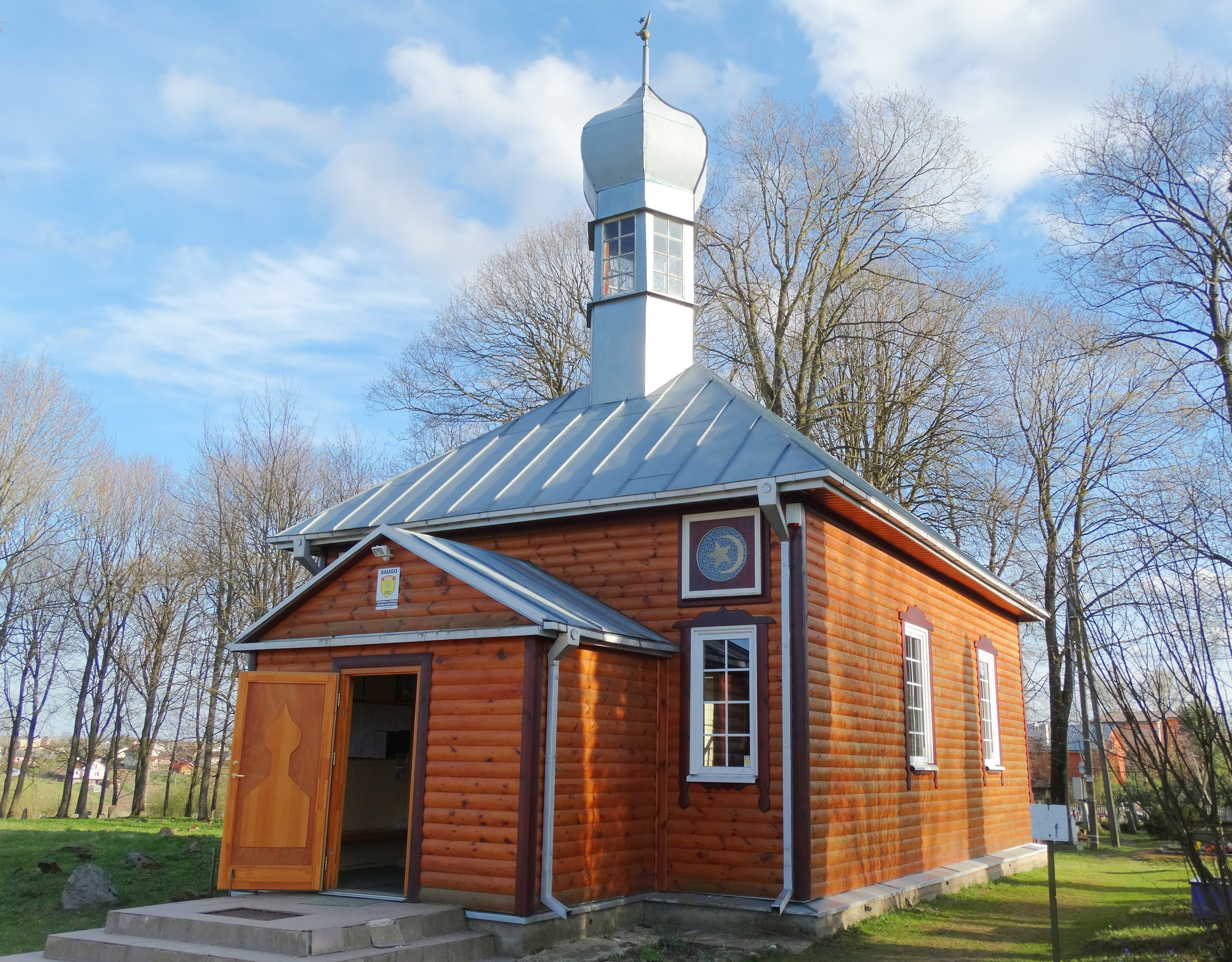
- Tatar mosque in the Tatar cemetery of Nemėžis

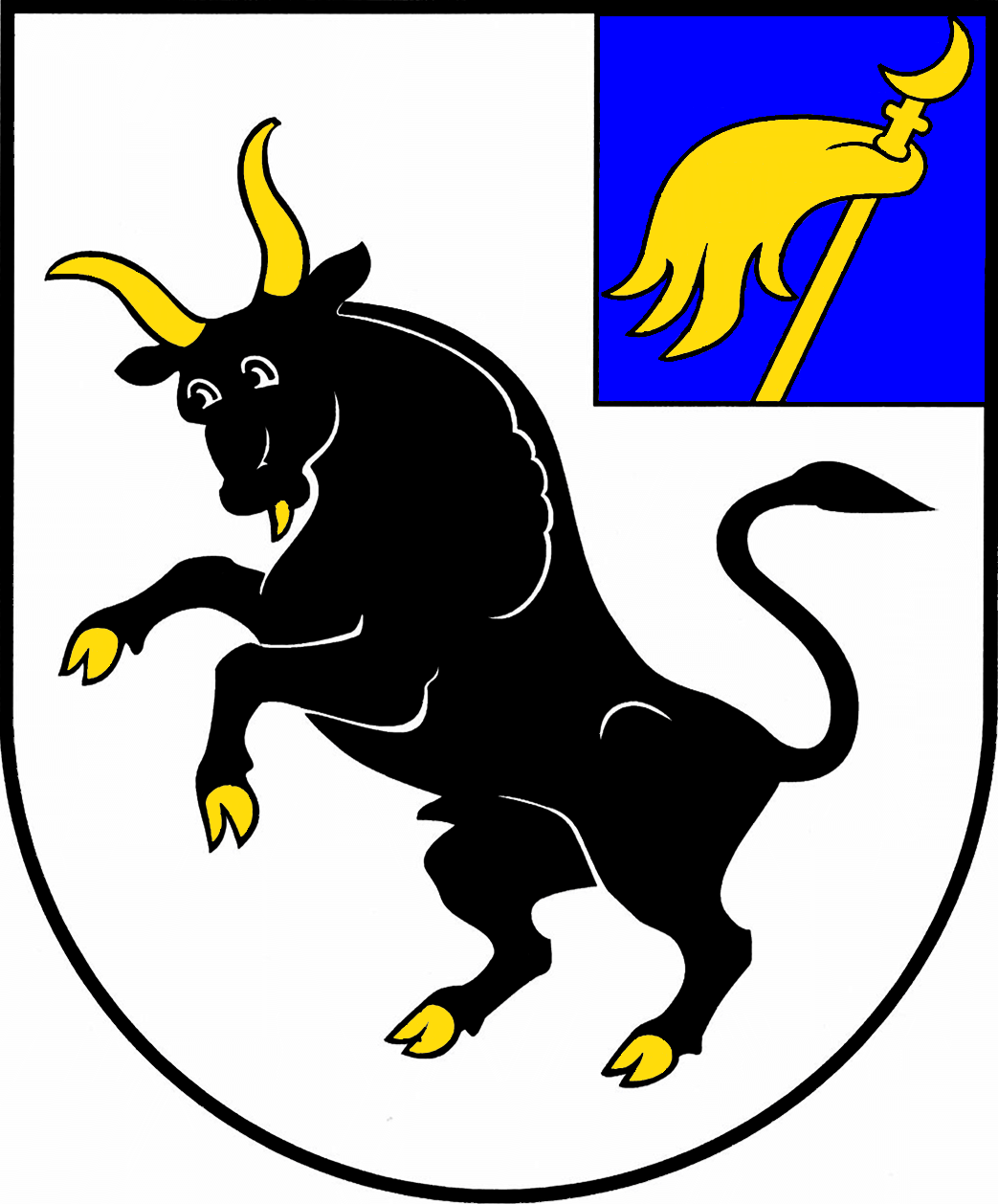
- Coat of arms

- Location of Nemėžis
- Coordinates: 54°38′10″N 25°21′40″E
- Country: Lithuania
- County: Vilnius County
- Municipality: Vilnius district municipality
- Eldership: Nemėžis eldership
- Capital of: Nemėžis eldership
- First mentioned: 1496

Population (2021)
  - Total: 2,241
- Time zone: UTC+2 (EET)
  - Summer (DST): UTC+3 (EEST)

Nemėžis (Tatar: Немеж, romanized: Nemej) is a village in the Vilnius district municipality, Lithuania, it is located only about 1 kilometre (0.62 mi) east of Vilnius. It is located south-east of Vilnius along a railway.

== History ==
It is believed that there was a castle in Nemėžis during the reign of Vytautas the Great (1392–1430). The settlement was first mentioned in written sources in 1496 when Grand Duke of Lithuania Alexander Jagiellon welcomed his future wife Helena of Moscow here.

On 3 November 1656, the Truce of Vilna between Tsardom of Russia and the Polish–Lithuanian Commonwealth was signed in the Nemėžis estate, then owned by Lew Sapieha.

== Lipka Tatars ==
Nemėžis is one of several Lithuanian settlements where Lipka Tatars live. Brought as prisoners of war, Tatars were allowed to settle here in 1397 after Vytautas' expeditions against the Golden Horde (see the Battle of Blue Waters). Up until this day they have preserved their traditions and Islamic religion. At first Tatars served as personal guards for the Grand Duke of Lithuania, but later took up more civil professions: breeding horses, tanning, gardening. Eventually Tatars became known as excellent gardeners, growing eggplants, tomatoes, and other vegetables. Even today Nemėžis is known for its numerous greenhouses.

The first wooden mosque in Nemėžis was built in 1684. It burned down but a new one was built in 1909. During the Soviet times it was turned into a warehouse. After Lithuania declared independence, the mosque was returned to the community and it continues to be used for religious services. In 1993 it was restored. It is used for prayer only on Fridays, young moon. On that occasion a mullah comes from Vilnius. Nemėžis mosque is one of four operational mosques in Lithuania. Nemėžis also has an operational Tatar cemetery and a Tatar school. The other locality in Vilnius district municipality with sizeable Lithuanian Tatars presence is Keturiasdešimt Totorių village.

The village is home to about 400 Tatars as of 2017.

== Nemėžis estate ==
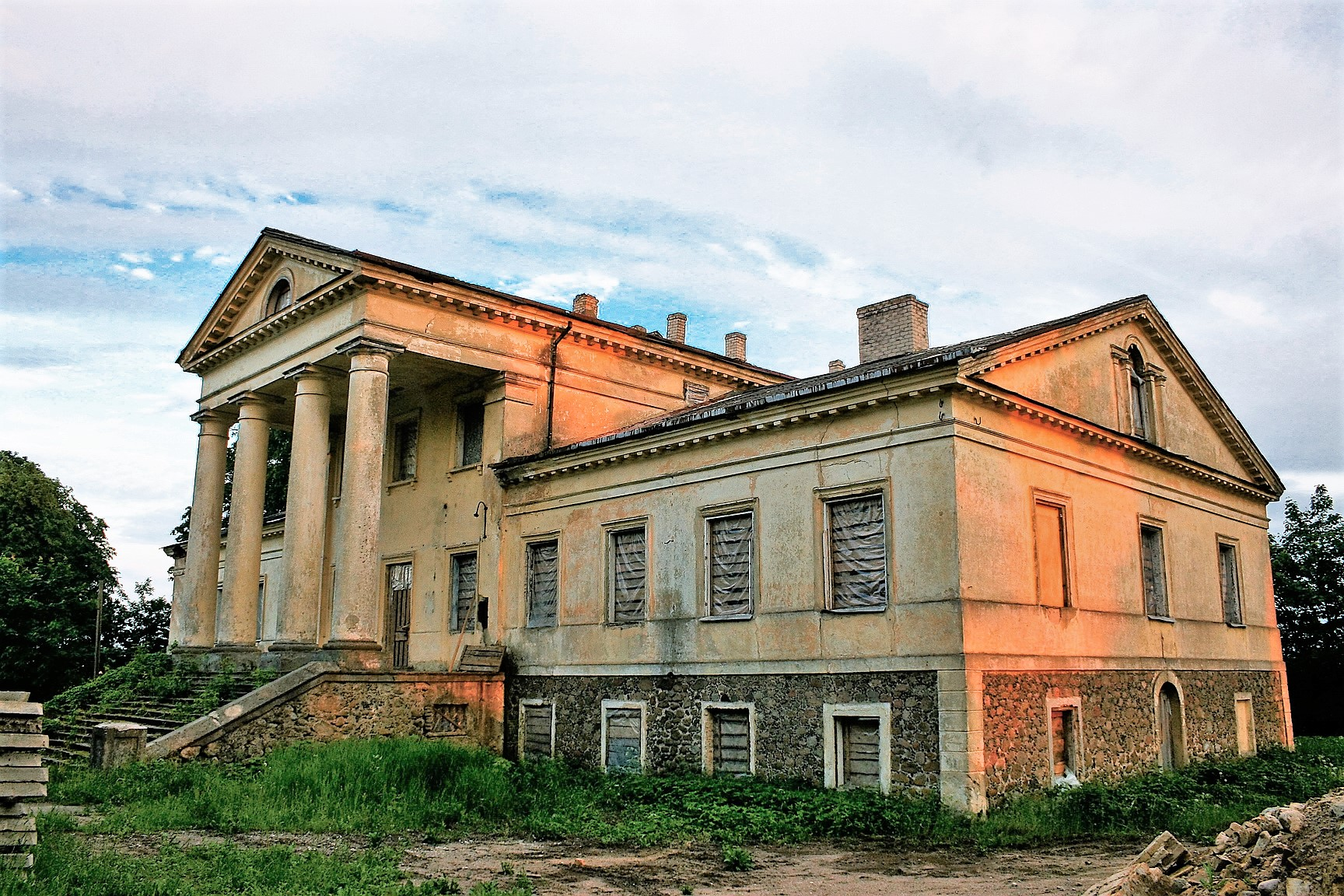
Nemėžis estate in 2007

The Nemėžis estate, located approximately 1 km outside the village, was established in the 16th century. At first it belonged to the Pac family, but changed hands frequently. Its owners at different times were the Radziwiłł family, Jan Kazimierz Sapieha, Jan Karol Chodkiewicz, Lew Sapieha, and the Ogiński family. Until the 19th century the manor was of a wooden construction. Around 1830 the place was bought by the Tyszkiewicz family and rebuilt the manor in bricks in 1836–1856. The park of the estate was destroyed while building a road connecting Vilnius with Minsk.

== Demographics ==
According to 2021 National Census, the ethnographic composition of the Nemėžis Eldership is diverse. Out of 8950 inhabitants:

- Poles - 4477 (50.0%)
- Lithuanians - 2604 (29.1%)
- Russians - 899 (10.0%)
- Belarusians - 429 (4.8%)
- Ukrainians - 119 (1.3%)
- Other - 322 (3.6%)
