= Vaidotai =

- Village
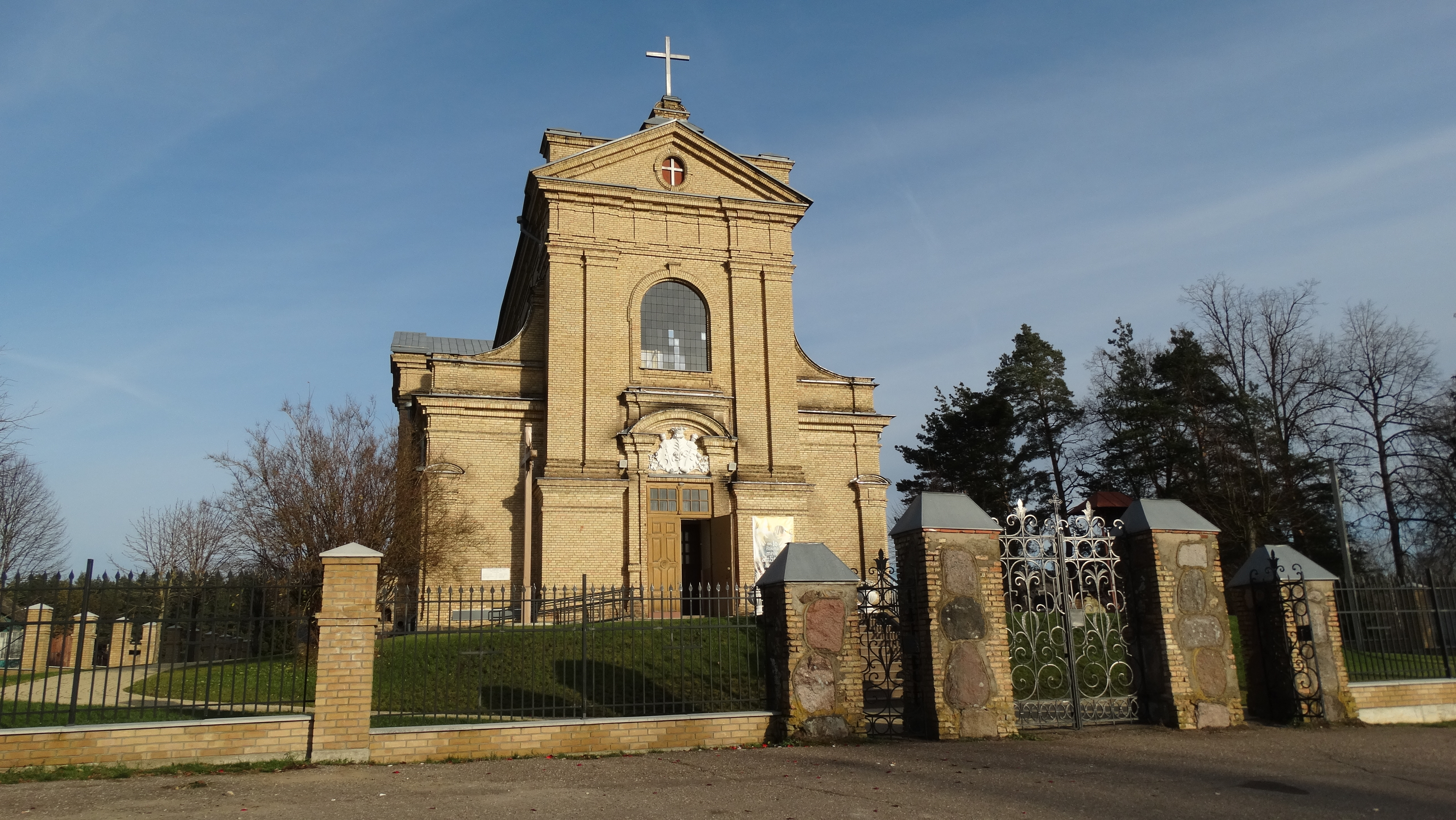
- Catholic church in Vaidotai

- Location of Vaidotai
- Coordinates: 54°36′00″N 25°10′30″E
- Country: Lithuania
- County: Vilnius County
- Municipality: Vilnius District Municipality
- Eldership: Pagiriai Eldership

Population (2011)
  - Total: 1,268
- Time zone: UTC+2 (EET)
  - Summer (DST): UTC+3 (EEST)

Vaidotai is a village in Vilnius District Municipality, Lithuania. According to the 2011 census, it had population of 1,268.

== History ==
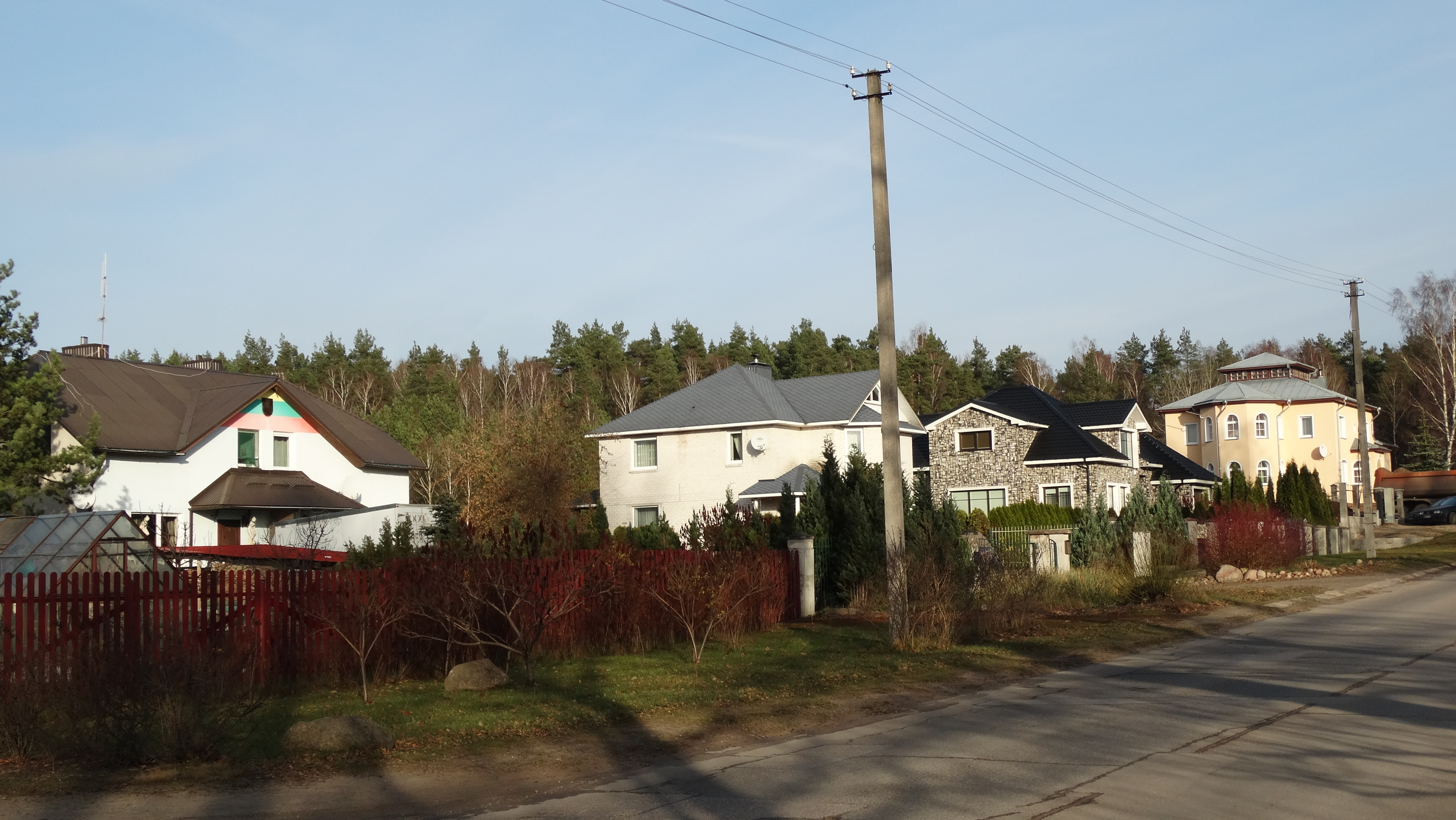
Residential houses in Vaidotai

The area was inhabited from the late 1st millennium AD. A mound from that period is situated near Vaidotai. Together with nearby Baltoji Vokė, with which its history is tightly connected, Vaidotai were mentioned in the written sources for the first time in 1375. The land property belonged to Radvilos ducal family and later to Zmijewski-Olizar family. On the right bank of Vokė river, opposite of Vaidotai, there was Baltoji Vokė Manor. In 1838 it was bought by Alexander Lenski. A Catholic Neo-Baroque style church in Vaidotai was built in 1910 by magnates Lenskis order. In the late XX century, western part of Vaidotai was attached to Vilnius. Vaidotai railway station, which was built in the late 1990s, is situated near the village. It's currently the main freight railway station in Lithuania. Two international railway lines run through Vaidotai: the first from Ukraine and Baranovichi and the second from Molodechno. Vilnius city buses' routes number 2 and 8 connect the area with the capital city.
