= Vokė =

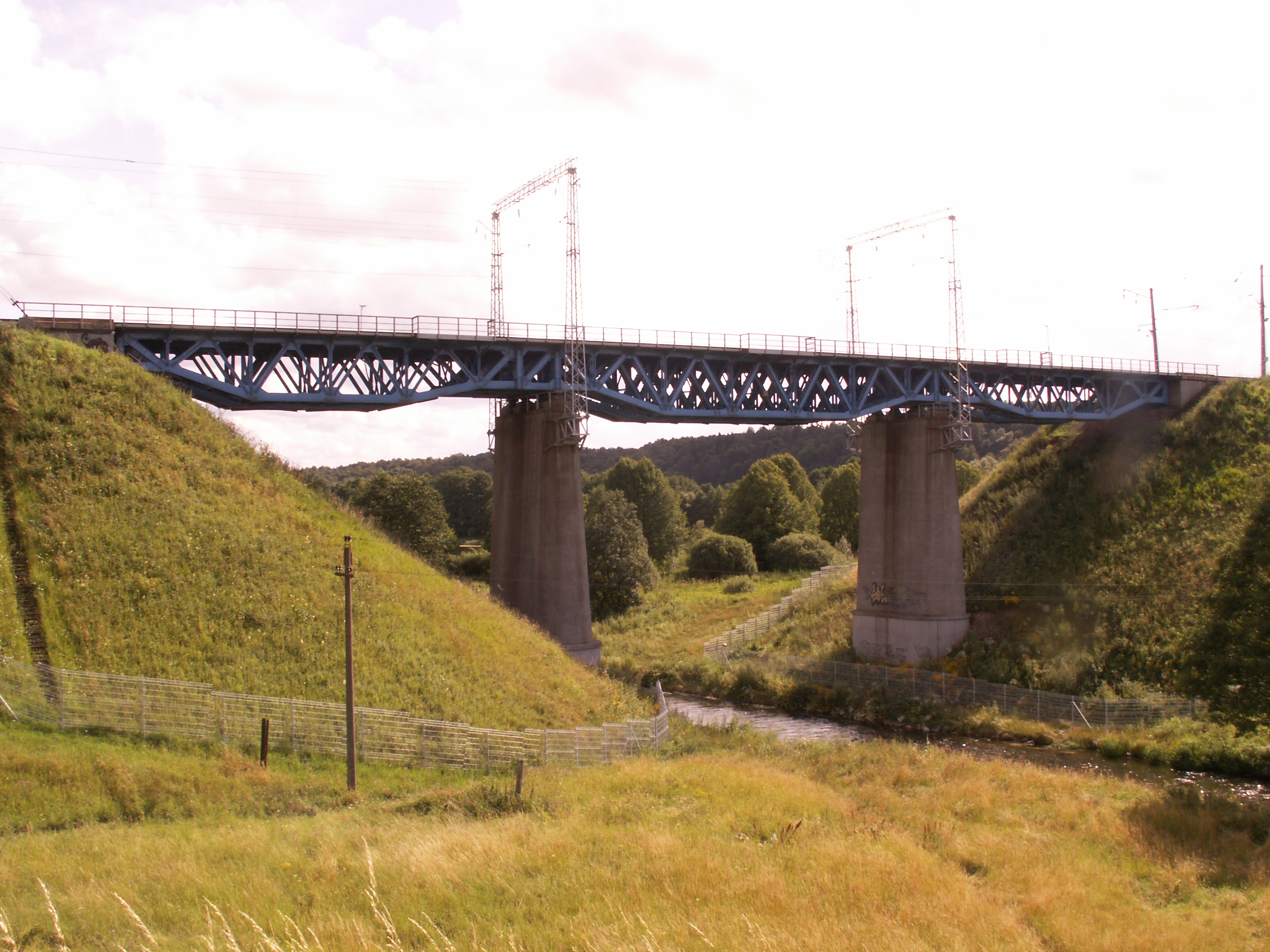

Location
- Country: Lithuania

Physical characteristics
- Mouth: Neris
  - coordinates: 54°41′16″N 25°04′37″E

Basin features
- Progression: Neris→ Neman→ Baltic Sea

The Vokė is a river in southeast Lithuania. It is a left tributary of Neris River. The Vokė flows from Papis Lake, near the Merkys.
