= Ukrainians in Lithuania =

Ethnic group in Lithuania

Ukrainians in Lithuania Українці Литви
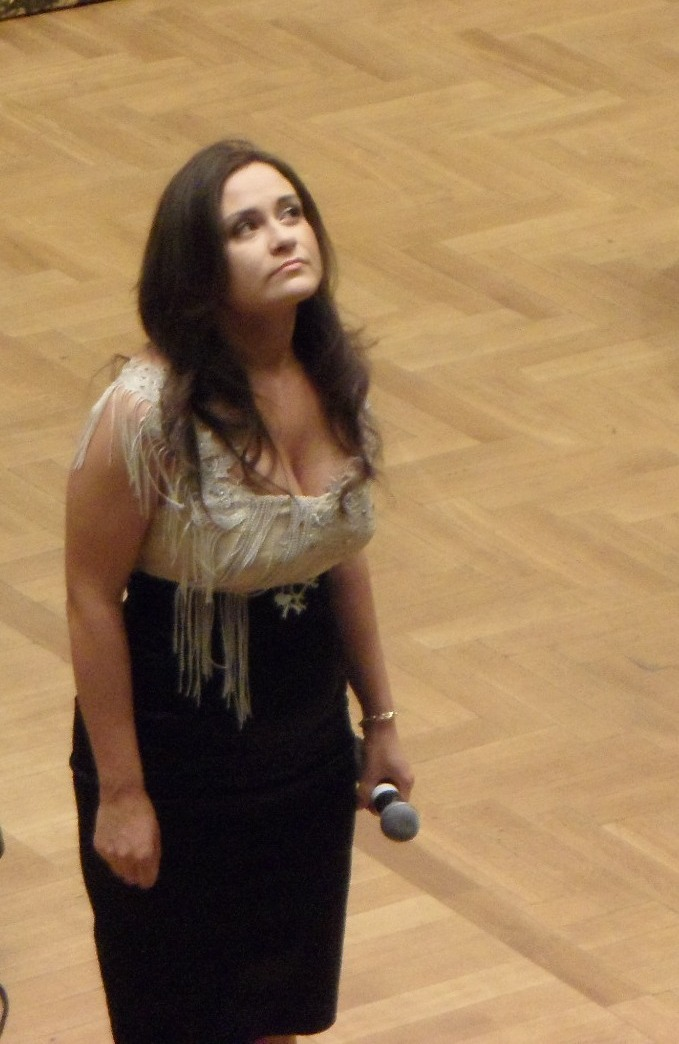
Evelina Sašenko

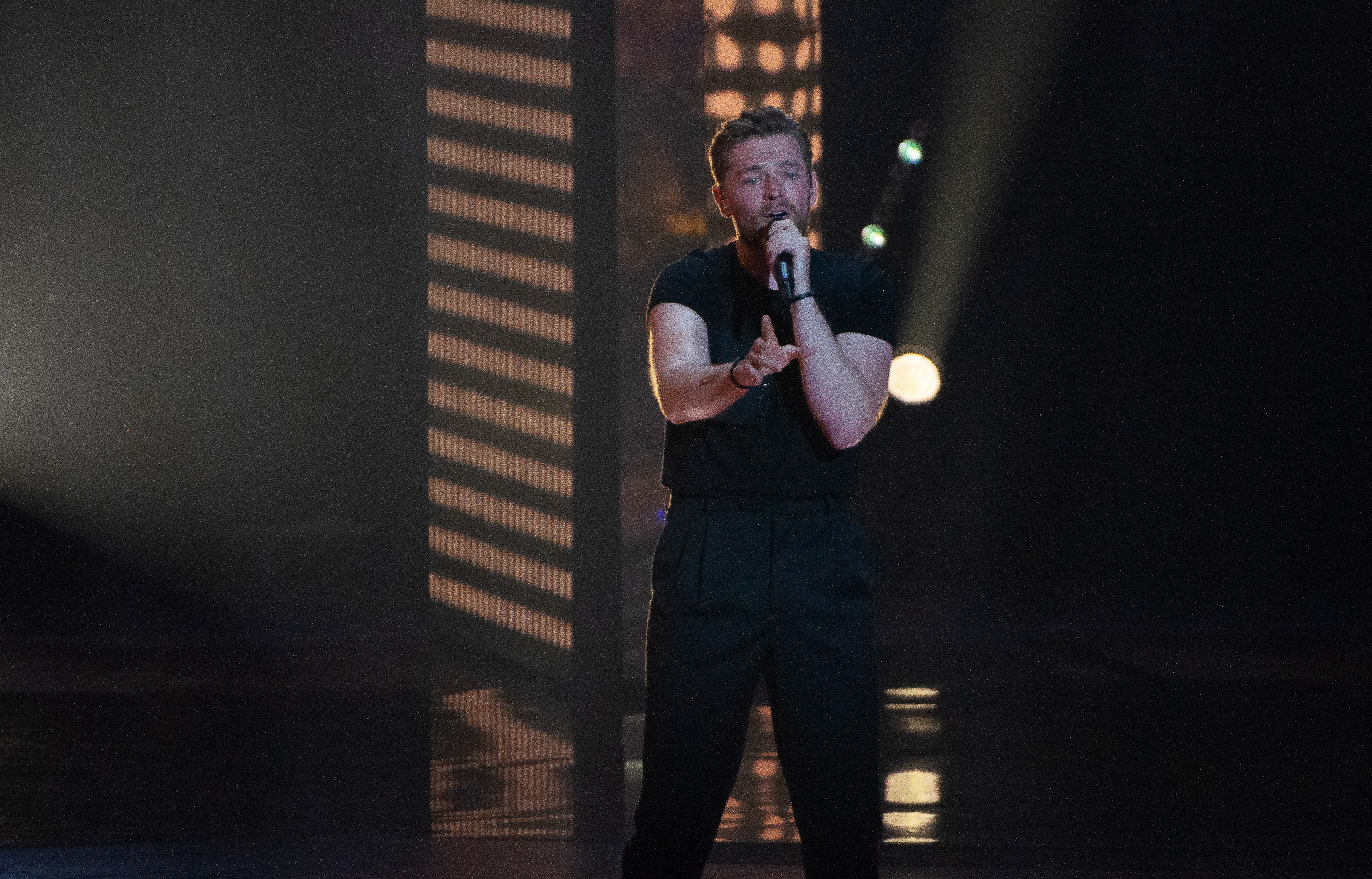
Jurijus Veklenko

Total population
- 14,168; 0.5% of the Lithuanian population

Regions with significant populations
- Vilnius, Klaipėda, Visaginas, Kaunas

Languages
- Russian, Lithuanian, Ukrainian

Religion
- Ukrainian Catholic, Ukrainian Orthodox

Related ethnic groups
- Ukrainians, Slavic Peoples especially East Slavs

The Ukrainians in Lithuania (Ukrainian: Українці, romanized: Ukrayintsi; Lithuanian: Ukrainiečiai) numbered 14,168 persons at the 2021 Lithuanian census, and at 0.5% of the total population of Lithuania (approximately 2,810,761). The Ukrainian national minority in Lithuania has deep historical and cultural relations. Many prominent figures of Ukraine such as Taras Shevchenko, Meletius Smotrytsky, Yakiv Holovatsky, St. Yosafat (in the world — Ivan Kuntsevich, a religious figure of Greco-Catholic church canonized in 1967) and others stayed and created in Lithuania.

== Statistics ==
According to the census of 2001, 22,000 ethnic Ukrainians live in Lithuania, making up 0.65% of the population of the country. This makes them the fourth largest national minority. They mainly live in the following cities: Vilnius (7,159), Klaipėda (4,652), Kaunas (1,906), Šiauliai (875), Visaginas (1,583), and Jonava (431). They make up about 0.4% of the rural population.

According to 2011 census there were two municipalities and five more cities with more than 1% Ukrainians:

- Visaginas Municipality (5.12%)
- Klaipėda City Municipality (1.92%)
- Elektrėnai (1.44%)
- Pabradė (1.16%)
- Grigiškės (1.15%)
- Šalčininkai (1.03%)
- Lentvaris (1.02%)

== History ==
In the middle of the 14th century Ukrainian lands (the Kyiv, Chernihiv, Pereyaslav regions) became part of the Grand Duchy of Lithuania. It is presumed that in 1572, Ukrainians made up to 3% of the population of the Grand Duchy of Lithuania. The residence of the Kiev metropolitan was situated in Vilnius. In 1596, the Union of Brest made Ukrainians part of the Catholic church, contributed to a furthering of the spiritual connections between the Ukrainian and Lithuanian people.

During the Russian Empire according to the demographic data of 1857 and 1897 the Ukrainians made up 0.1% of the population of Lithuania. In 1897 their number reached 2,500.

Interwar censuses did not record the number of persons of Ukrainian nationality, so their number during this period is unknown. However, active organizations of Ukrainians testify to the fact that Ukrainians lived in Vilnius, Kaunas, Kėdainiai, Alytus, and Tauragė.

The first head of the Organization of Ukrainian Nationalists, created in Vienna, was Yevhen Konovalets, the colonel of the UPR army and a citizen of Lithuania since 1929. Lithuania supported this organization morally and materially. From Lithuania the Ukrainians were represented in the OUN (Organization of Ukrainian Nationalists) by I. Rcvyuk (Y. Bartavichius). At this time the body of the Ukrainian military organization "Surma" appeared in Kaunas.

In October 1933, the Ukrainian national community of Lithuania was registered in Kaunas. However, it lasted for only four years. At the beginning of 1934 the cultural-educational society of the Ukrainians in Lithuania was founded in Kaunas. According to its regulation, its purpose was "to unite Lithuanians and Ukrainians for close collaboration, to develop and widen the Lithuanian and Ukrainian folk art and to help the poor Ukrainians". Y. Tovstenko was the head of the society, its founders and members of the board — P. IIrinyuk, A. Kryvonis, P. Vorona. R. Harych and others.

After Lithuania was annexed by the Soviet Union in 1940 and after the Second World War, the number of Ukrainians in the Lithuania grew considerably: from 17,692 in 1989 to 44,789 in 1989. This growth was mainly duo to so-called "production migration" related to the industrialization of the republic. After 1961, it was mainly engineering/technical intellectuals who migrated to Lithuania from Ukraine. Most of the Ukrainians worked in the power, chemical, fishing, and heavy industry. The newcomers came from both the eastern and western regions of Ukraine. Overall, during the period of 1970-1980, Ukrainians made up about 11% of newcomers to Lithuania.

After Lithuania became independent once more, almost all Ukrainians became citizens of Lithuania. About 7,000 returned to Ukraine.

== Politics ==
There were in total 3 ethnic Ukrainians elected in the municipality elections in 2011.

== Organisations ==
There are 19 Ukrainian organizations, including six communities of Ukrainians with centers in Vilnius, Visaginas, Jonava, Kaunas, Klaipėda, Panevežys. There are Ukrainian Sunday schools in Visaginas, Jonava, Klaipėda. Ukrainian musical collectives work at the communities or independently: "Prosvit" (Klaipėda) "Fir-Tree" (Kaunas) "Snowball Tree" (Visaginas), family ensemble "Svitlytsya" (Vilnius), the Museum of Ukraine works in Klaipėda. Ukrainian people actively participate in the cultural life of Lithuania, the musical level of their artistic collectives is especially high estimated. In 2005, in the annual festival of national minorities of Lithuania "Lithuania is our common house", collectives "Snowball Tree" (Visaginas) and "Fir-Tree" (Kaunas) participated. Every year the club of the Ukrainian traditional culture "Prosvit" is invited to participate in a big holiday "Sea Days" in Klaipėda. In Vilnius, the church of the Holy Trinity is under the leadership of the Ukrainian Greek Catholic Church.

== Famous Ukrainians in Lithuania ==
- Ewelina Saszenko — jazz singer.
- Jurijus Veklenko — singer.

== See also ==
- Ethnic minorities in Lithuania
- Lithuania–Ukraine relations
- Ukrainian diaspora
- Lithuanians in Ukraine
