= Tatar trail, Podlachia =

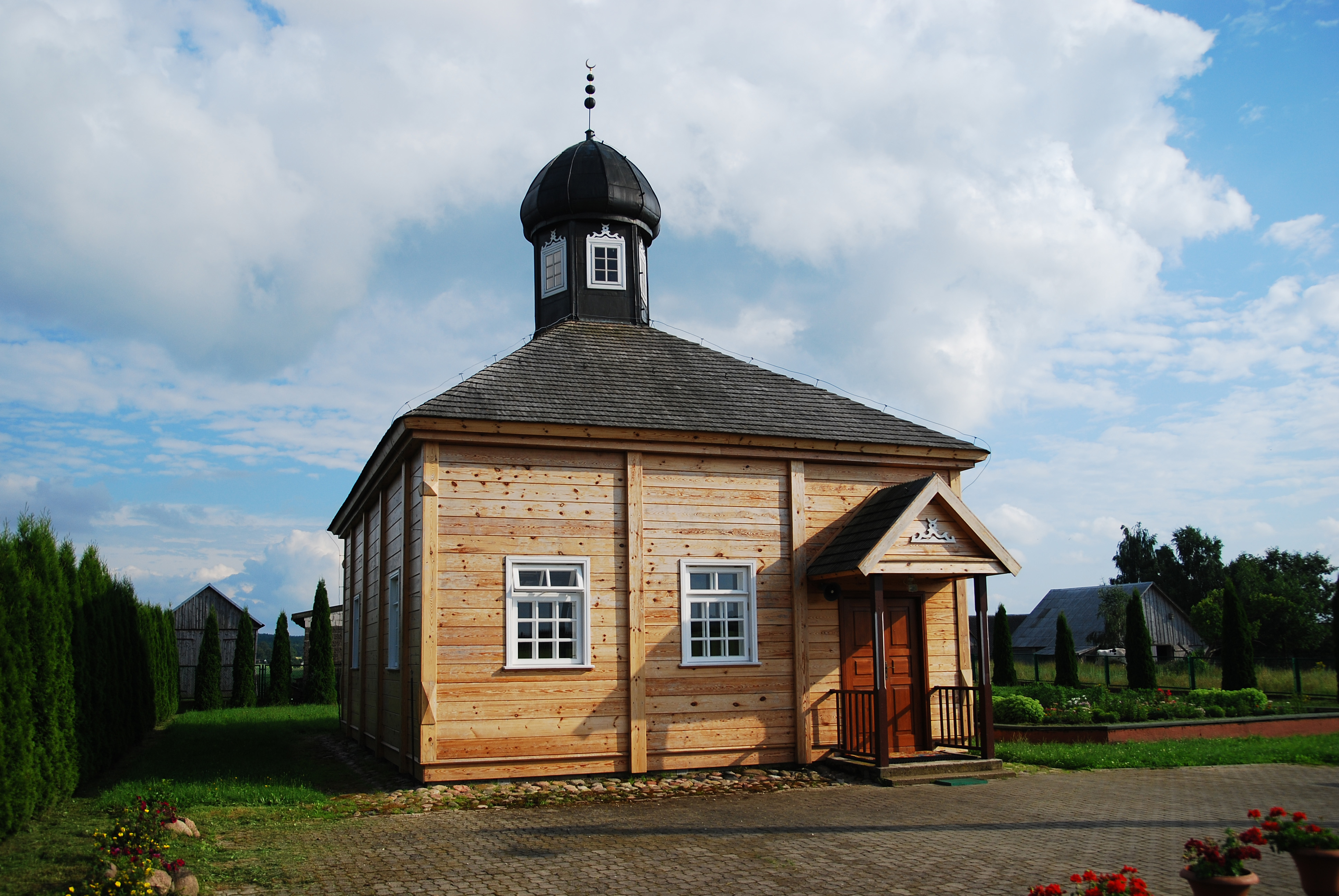
Bohoniki Mosque on the Tatar Trail

The Tatar Trail (Polish: Szlak Tatarski) of Podlaskie Voivodeship in Eastern Poland consists of two marked trails along sites related to the Lipka Tatars. The longer Szlak Tatarski Duży, marked in green, has 57 kilometers. The blue-marked Szlak Tatarski Mały is shorter at 19 kilometers of length. The attractions are mainly of historical interest. Rural tourism facilities give opportunity to meet Tatar families and learn about their culture. As it runs through the Knyszyń Forest, the trail offers insight into nature as well.

== Trail's route ==
Szlak Tatarski Duży runs through Sokółka, Bohoniki, Stara Kamionka, Wierzchlesie, Talkowszczyzna, Nowa Świdziałówka and Kruszyniany.

The shorter Szlak Tatarski Mały encompasses Kruszyniany, Józefowo, Królowe Stojło and Waliły-Stacja. It connects sites related to Tatar settlement in Podlachia with the ones related to the January Uprising.

== Main attractions ==
- Sokółka
  - Regional Museum (Polish: Muzeum Ziemi Sokólskiej), which has sections related to Lipka Tatar history
  - 16th/17th century town square
  - St. Anthony's Catholic Church, a neoclassical building erected in 1848
  - St. Alexander Newski’s Orthodox Church from 1830
- Bohoniki
  - Bohoniki Mosque, a wooden mosque built in 19th century
  - Islamic cemetery. With three centuries of history and at 2ha, this is the oldest and the biggest still active Muslim graveyard
- Kruszyniany
  - Kruszyniany Mosque, built from wood, the oldest Tatar mosque in Poland
  - Muslim cemetery

== Gallery ==
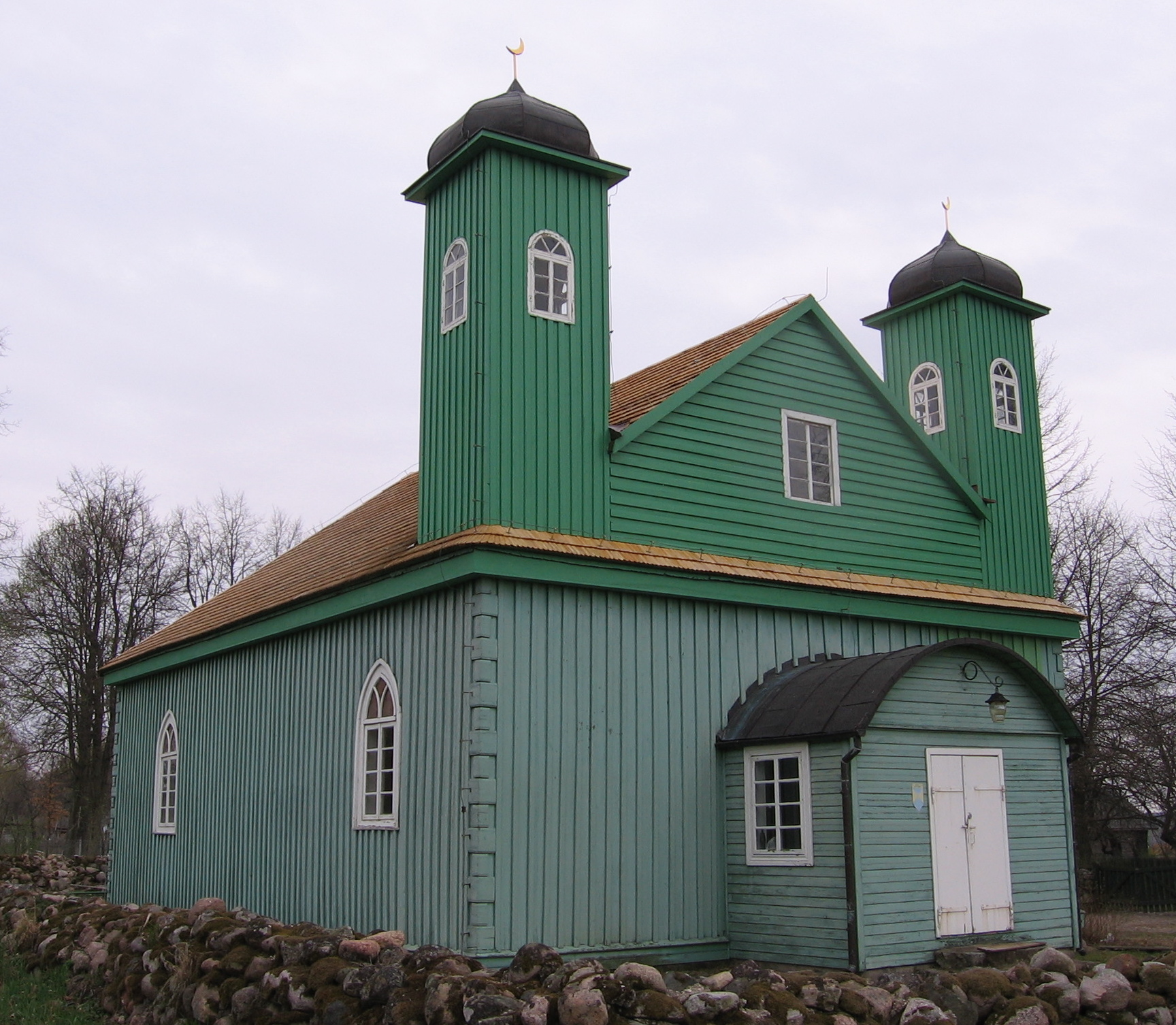
Wooden mosque in Kruszyniany

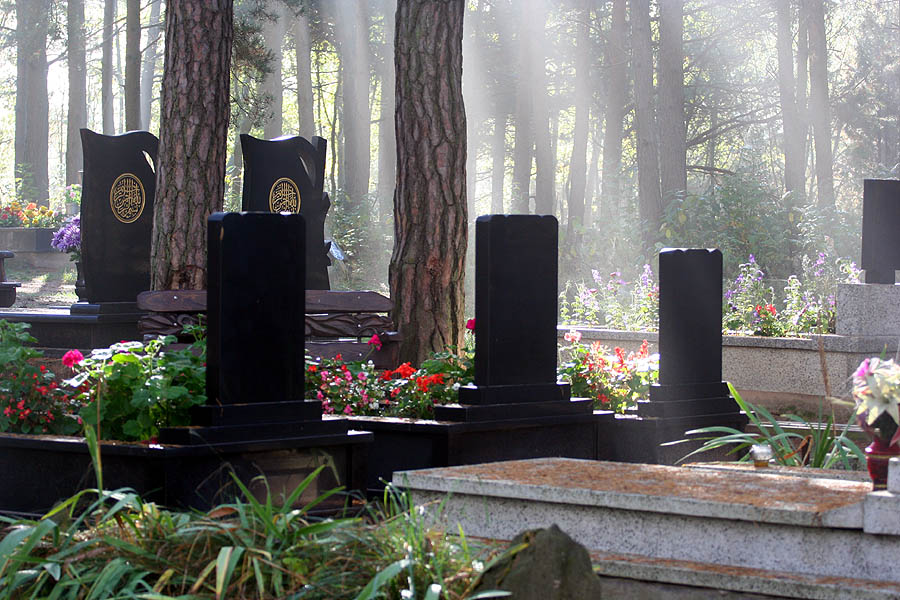
The Tatar Cemetery in Kruszyniany

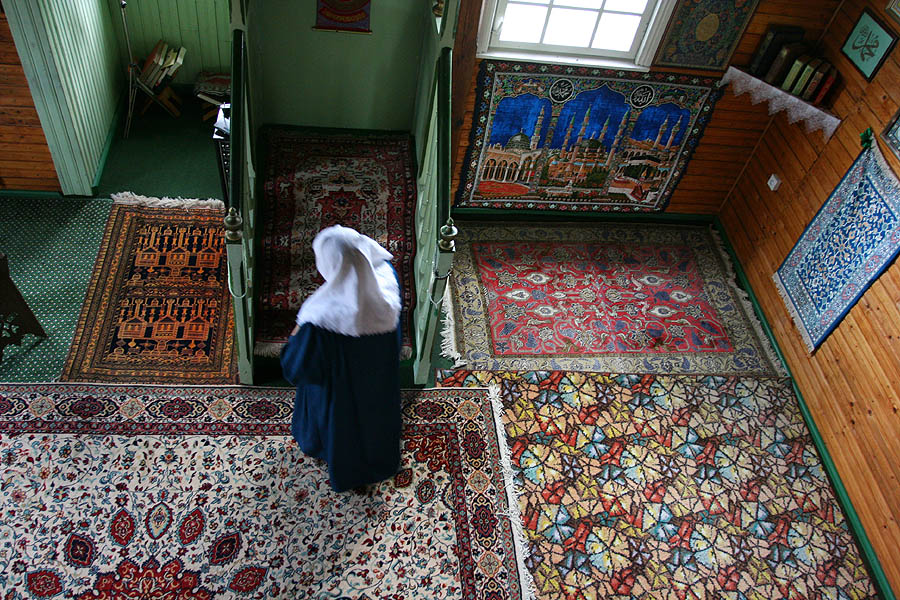
Mosque in Bohoniki

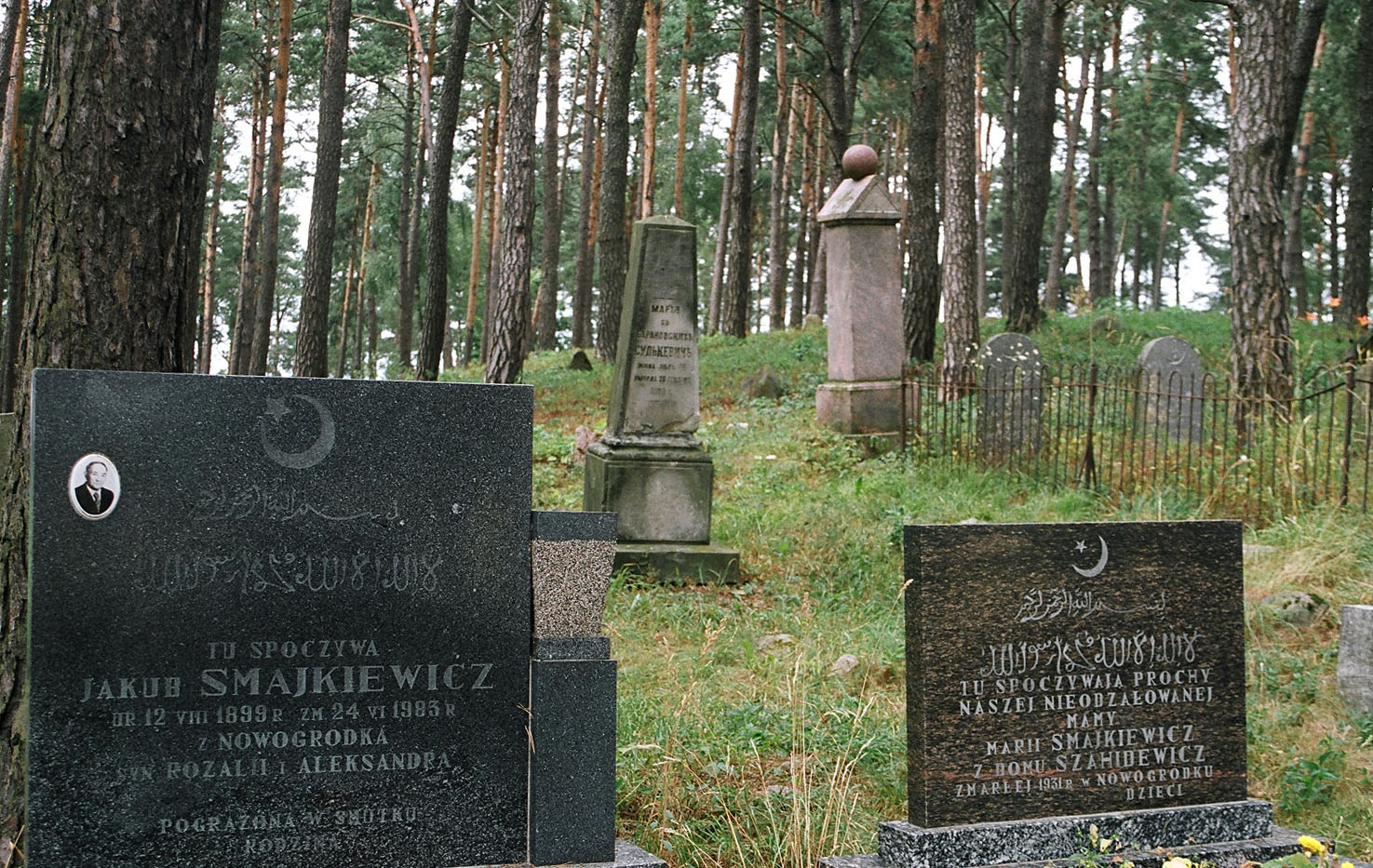
Muslim cemetery in Bohoniki

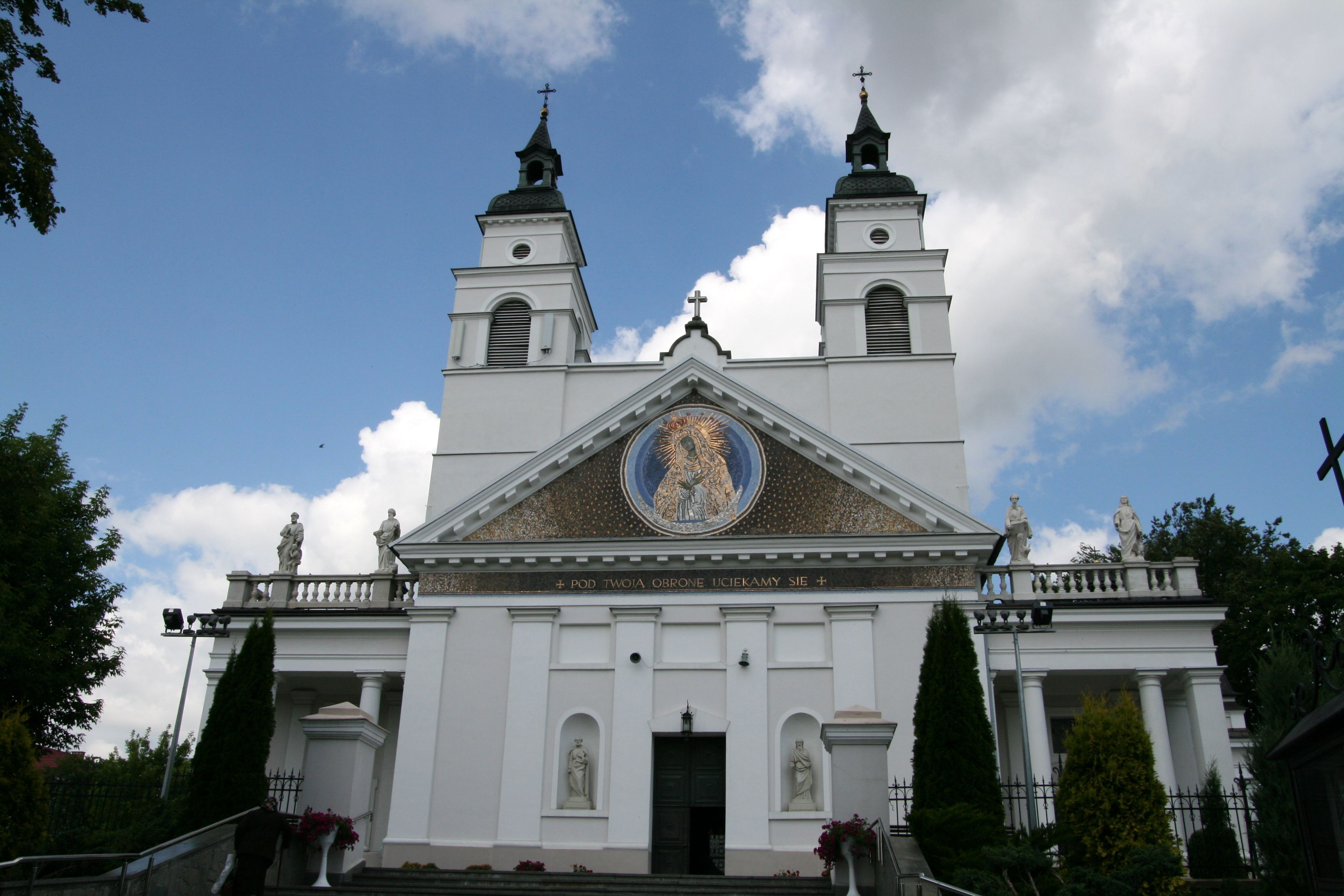
Neoclassical Church of St. Anthony in Sokółka

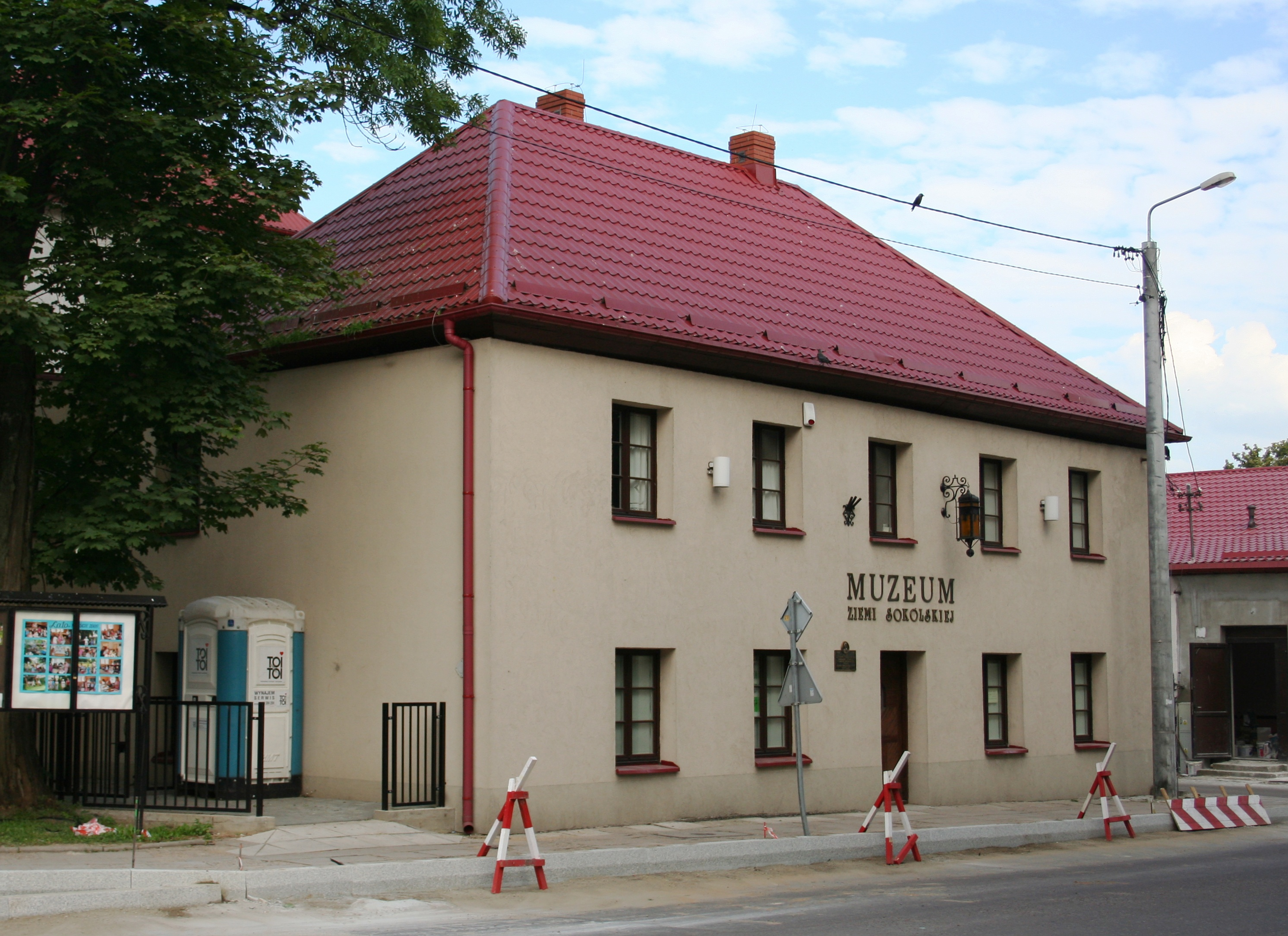
Sokółka Regional Museum

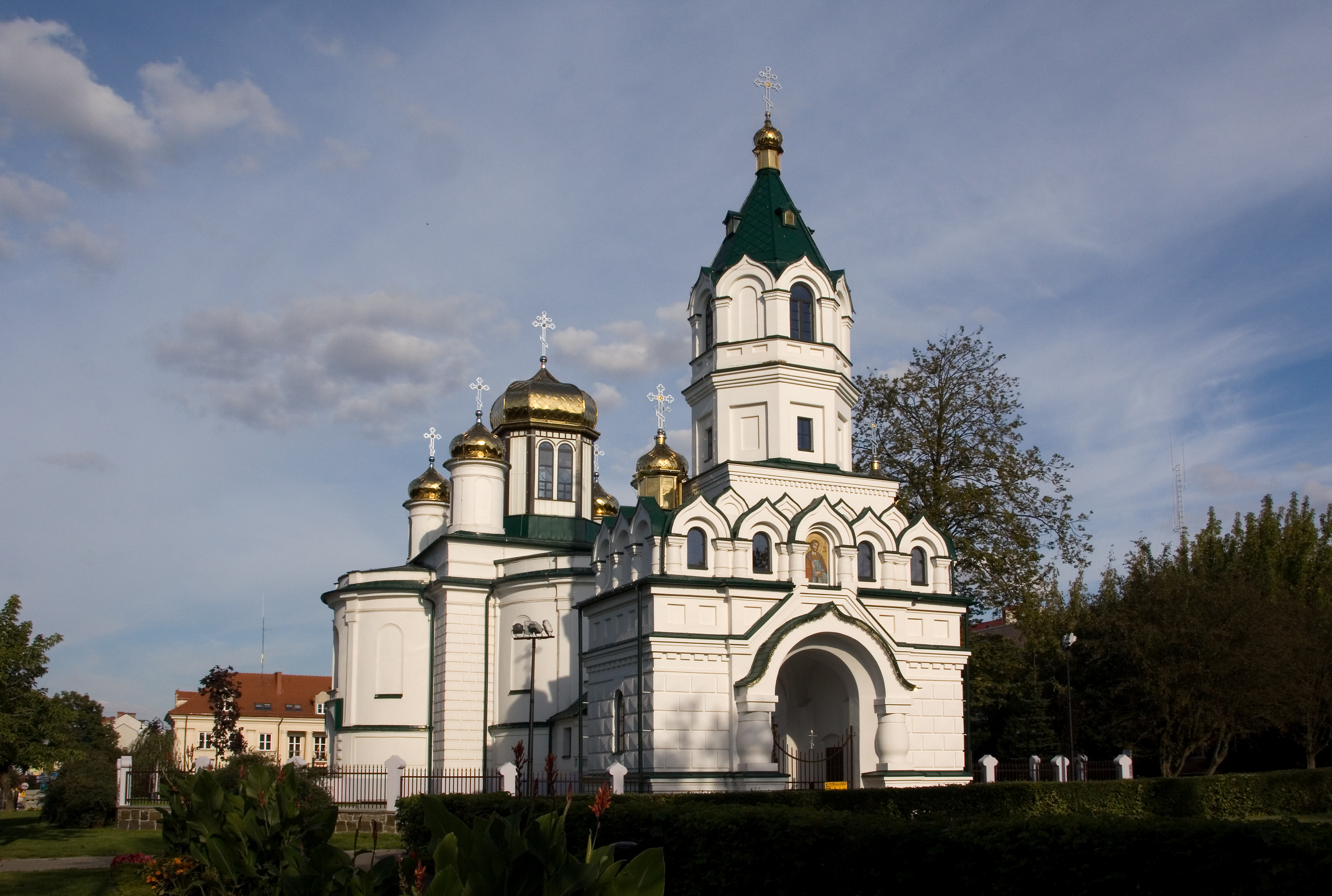
St. Alexander Newski Orthodox Church in Sokółka
