= Hasan Konopacki =

Polish, Russian, Belarusian soldier, politician, and journalist (1879–1953)

- Гасан Амуратавіч Канапацкі
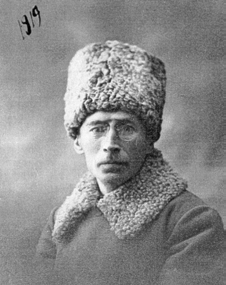
- Hasan Konopacki c. 1919
- Born: 25 February 1879; Minsk, Russian Empire
- Died: 11 May 1953 (aged 74); Bydgoszcz, Poland
- Resting place: Municipal Cemetery, Kcyńska Street
- Occupations: Officer, politician, journalist
- Awards

Hasan Konopacki (Belarusian: Гасан Амуратавіч Канапацкі, Hasan Amuratavič Kanapacki) (1879–1953) was a Lipka Tatar politician, journalist and military officer that served in the Imperial Russian, Lithuanian and Polish armies. Hasan Konopacki was closely connected with the Belarusian national movement and was a commander of Belarusian military units in the Lithuanian Army (1918–1919), Polish Army (1919–1920) as well as a member of the Poland-close Belarusian Military Commission. Before that, he participated in the Russo-Japanese War (1904–1905) as an artillery colonel and in World War I on the Russian side. During the Second Polish Republic (1918–1939) he worked as a politician and a journalist of the Belarusian minority in Poland, advocating the creation of a Belarusian state in close cooperation with Poland.

== Life ==
=== Youth and Russian military service ===
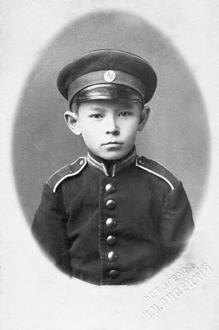
Young Hassan at 10

Konopacki was born on February 25, 1879, in Minsk, then in Russian Empire. His noble Muslim family belonged to the Lipka Tatars. His father Amurat Konopacki, worked as a Collegiate assessor. He graduated from the Polotsk Cadet Corps (Russian: Полоцкий кадетский корпус) and transferred in 1897 to Saint Petersburg Artillery School. He spent his military service with the rank of second lieutenant of the Imperial Russian Army.

In 1904, Konopacki was sent to the Transbaikal Oblast, where the First Siberian Artillery Brigade was being formed. There, he was appointed officer of the 1st Battery. From 1904 to 1905, he participated in the Russo-Japanese war, where he was wounded during the Battle of Liaoyang (August 1904). In 1906, his brigade moved to Nerchinsk, 644 kilometres (400 mi) east of Lake Baikal.

As a battery officer, he performed various functions:

- member of the Honorary Court;
- member of the Officer's Capital Loan Commission;
- manager of the officers' library.

In 1909, he was promoted to the rank of captain. Subsequently, he left Nerczyńsk to the Chinese border, at Blagoveshchensk, near the Amur river, to set up and command the 2nd Battery of the 10th Siberian Field Artillery Brigade. On 8 September 1912, he was sent further east to Khabarovsk to train recruits. Upon his own request, on 13 October 1912, Hasan moved to the 3rd Field Artillery Brigade in Kaluga, 150 kilometres (93 mi) southwest of Moscow. On 18 July 1914, he was appointed Commander of the 5th Battery of the 57th Field Artillery Brigade.

Konopacki took part in World War I in successive positions:

- on 30 July 1914, commander of the 1st park of the 57th Field Artillery Brigade;
- on 10 November 1916, commander of the 6th Battery of the 69th Field Artillery Brigade of the Russian front;
- as a lieutenant colonel, on 23 January 1917, commander of the 69th Field Artillery Brigade.

On 6 November 1917 he was promoted to colonel.

On the front, he was struck by combat gases: as such he was transferred to Minsk to a rear evacuation point. On May 10, 1918, in relation with the reform of the 69th Field Artillery Brigade, he handed over documents and finances to the "Moscow Regional Commissariat of Military Affairs".

=== Belarusian Military Commission ===
Once in Minsk, Hasan Konopacki became involved with activists of the Belarusian National Movement. He moved to the area under the control of the Republic of Lithuania and started to cooperate with the Belarusian military troops he trained. At the end of December 1918, he was assigned to Vilnius' 1st Belarusian Infantry Regiment. With the invading Red Army approaching the city, Hasan evacuated on December 27, with his unit and most of the activists to Grodno then under German control.

In the middle of 1919, Minsk was recaptured from the Bolsheviks by the Polish forces; Hasan then championed the creation of a Belarusian state alongside the Second Polish Republic. He became a member of the newly established "Belarusian Military Commission" (Polish: Białoruska Komisja Wojskowa) or "BKW". This short lived body (August 1919–March 1921), initially set up unilaterally by Belarusian activists, aimed at forming a Belarusian national army as an allied force of the Polish Army. A project was developed to build a 20,000-strong Belarusian infantry division consisting of three infantry regiments, an artillery regiment, a cavalry squadron and a sapper company.

In this commission, Konopacki first chaired the military department (at the end of September) and later the organizational committee (at the turn of September and October). In mid-October 1919, he was a member of a delegation from the Belarusian Central Council in Vilnius and Grodno going to Warsaw to talk with the Polish authorities on Belarusian-Polish cooperation. On October 22, 1919, by a decree of Józef Piłsudski, Hasan Konopacki was appointed Commander of the Belarusian military units in the Polish Army and was also approved as a full member of the "BKW". It is around this period that he became friend with Belarusian poet Yanka Kupala.

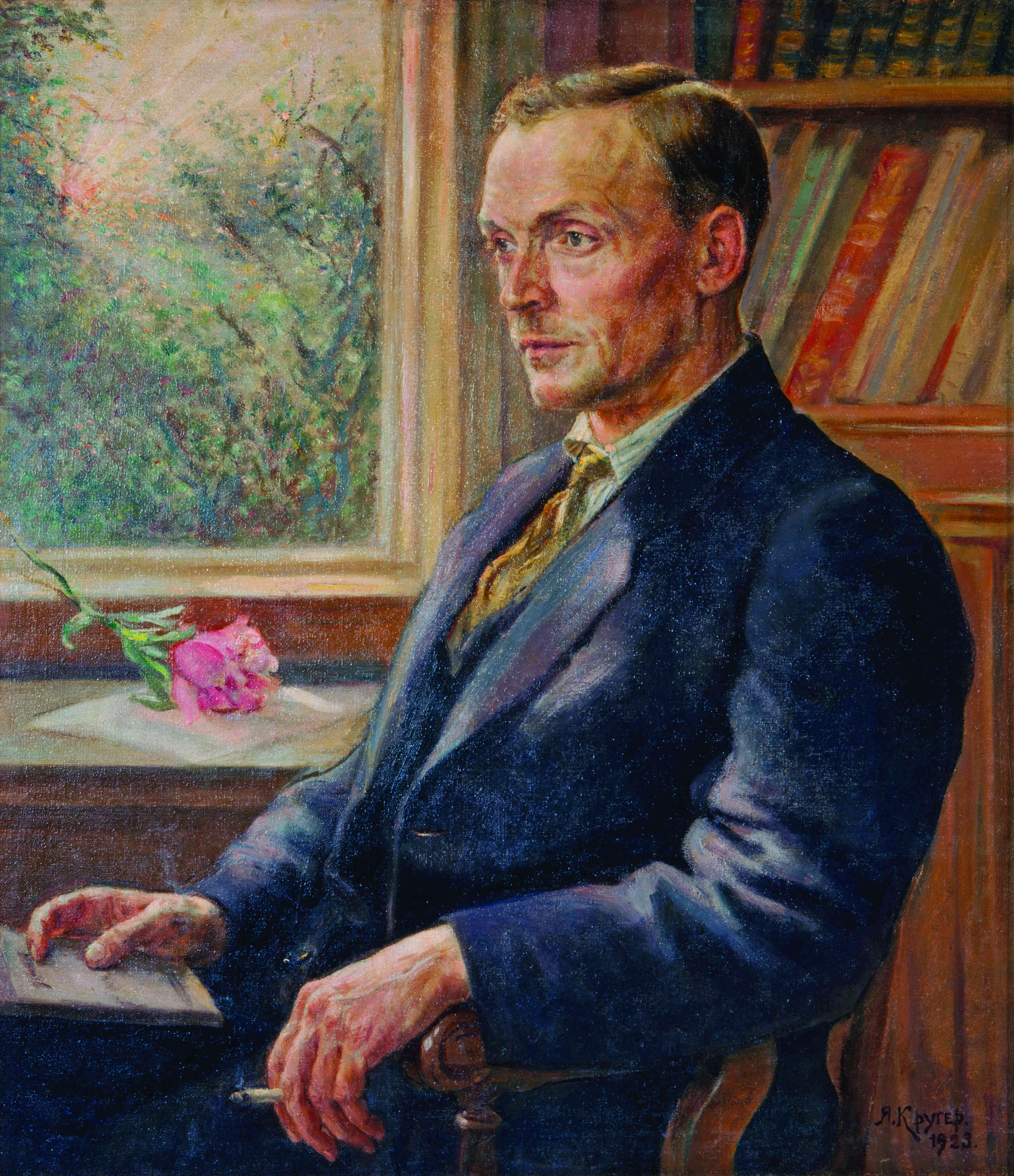
Yanka Kupala in 1923

Hassan Konopacki considered the preparation of officer and non-commissioned officer cadres as a priority. Therefore, he supported the sending of the future Belarusian troops to officer courses and Belarusian studies courses, especially in the field of Belarusian language and military terminology. Together with activist Paweł Aleksiuk and poet Alyaksandr Pruszynski, he participated in talks with the Polish military authorities towards this concept, resulting in March 1920, on an agreement to offer 100 to 120 seats:

- for Belarusian officers on 9 months long courses at the Infantry Cadet School in Warsaw;
- for Belarusian NCOs on 3 months long courses at the NCO School Ostrów Mazowiecka.

Furthermore, he choose the city of Slonim as a main training place. It moved later to Baranavichy.

While commanding Belarusian troops, Hasan Konopacki came into conflict with other members of the BKW: he logically considered his units to be under Polish command, which meant that BKW had no influence on the recruitment and training process. In addition, he welcomed in his troops former officers from the Russian Empire army, who were not connected with the original Belarusian national movement. These moves led to an open conflict with members of the Belarusian Military Commission: on April 8, 1920, Paweł Aleksiuk, chairman of the BKW, supported by many BKW members, accused Konopacki of hampering the nascent organization of Belarusian troops. According to the historian Oleg Łatyszonek, this dispute emanated in fact from the initial desire to have the command of Belarusian troops subordinated to the BKW instead of the Polish Military Command.

Trapped in this stalemate, Hasan Konopacki confirmed his resignation from the BKW on April 17, 1920, citing his poor health. However concurrently, he contacted the Polish Command in Minsk and the command of the 4th Polish Army to refuse his resignation and to remove Paweł Aleksiuk, Antoni Owsianik and A. Jakubecki from the BKW. Although Minsk Polish Command considered favorably Konopacki's moves, most of the BKW members, starting with Paweł Aleksiuk, threatened to resign should Hassan Konopacki remain as commander of Belarusian troops. Eventually, the decision lied with Józef Piłsudski, Polish head of State, who followed Aleksiuk's motion: on May 22, Hasan Konopacki was replaced by a Polish officer, Major Józef Tunguz-Zawiślak within the commission.

Konopacki was transferred to the so-called "Vilnius Belarusian Military Commission reserve". There, he underwent training in accordance with Polish regulations but was not allowed to wear the uniform.

=== Activities in Lithuania ===
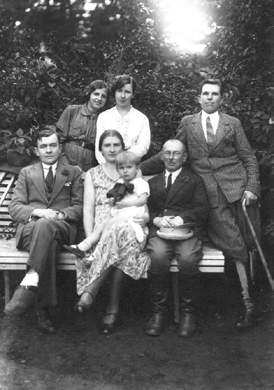
Konopacki in Iwye, second from the right

From the summer of 1920, the Konopacki's lived in Vilnius, in an apartment in Lwowska street (today's Lvovo street). Although active in the Belarusian National movement, Hasan did not have a permanent job. He improved his poor military pension by working in various positions: ticket collector at the cinema on Wileńska street, road works supervisor or later as a supervisor at the Zamoyski estate in Iwye.

He was deputy chairman of the Council of Elders of the Belarusian Music and Drama Club and secretary of the "Belarusian Civic Assembly". After the split of this body, in September, 1924, he became the vice-chairman of the newly formed "Provisional Belarusian Council", gathering supporters of a loyal cooperation with Poland, as opposed to the "Belarusian Deputies' Club" and other Belarusian organizations which mistrusted Warsaw. In April 1925, Konopacki, together with Bekisz and Łappo-Starzcki, left the council, disagreeing with the directions taken. In parallel, the "Provisional Belarusian Council" accused Hasan, previously treasurer's guardian of the organization, of financial mismanagement.

In Vilnius, Konopacki had a febrile activity as a member of the "Belarusian Chatka" Society (Belarusian Hut) which regularly staged Kupala's national Belarusian plays. In addition he represented the "Praswieta Society (for education)" at a congress organized by the "Provisional Belarusian Council" in Western Belarus (June 26–28, 1926). He also dutifully wrote articles for newspapers published by the "Belarusian Chatka", signing with the initials H.K. and H.K-i. In total, 12 issues of this magazine were published.

After the Polish Coup in May 1926, he joined his voice to a group of activists (comprising Wsiewołod Pawlukiewicz, S. Drucki-Podbereski, A. Kabyczkin, Frantsishak Alyakhnovich, Znamierowski and B. Szyszkow) striving to create a "Belarusian Intelligentsia Club". From November 27, 1927, to April 2, 1928, he worked as the editor-in-chief of the newspaper "Biełaruski Radny", devoted to local government affairs of the Belarusian community in Poland.

In March 1928, during the Polish election campaign to the Sejm and the Senate, he was the chairman of the Central All-Belarusian People's Election Committee, gathering Belarusian organizations sympathetic to the Polish state. This committee presented—to no avail—candidates in the cities of Novogrudok and Lida (both located today in Belarus).

From this "Vilnius" period, Hasan kept long life friend: in addition to poet, playwright and journalist Kupala, there were Maksim Tank and writer Frantsishak Alyakhnovich.

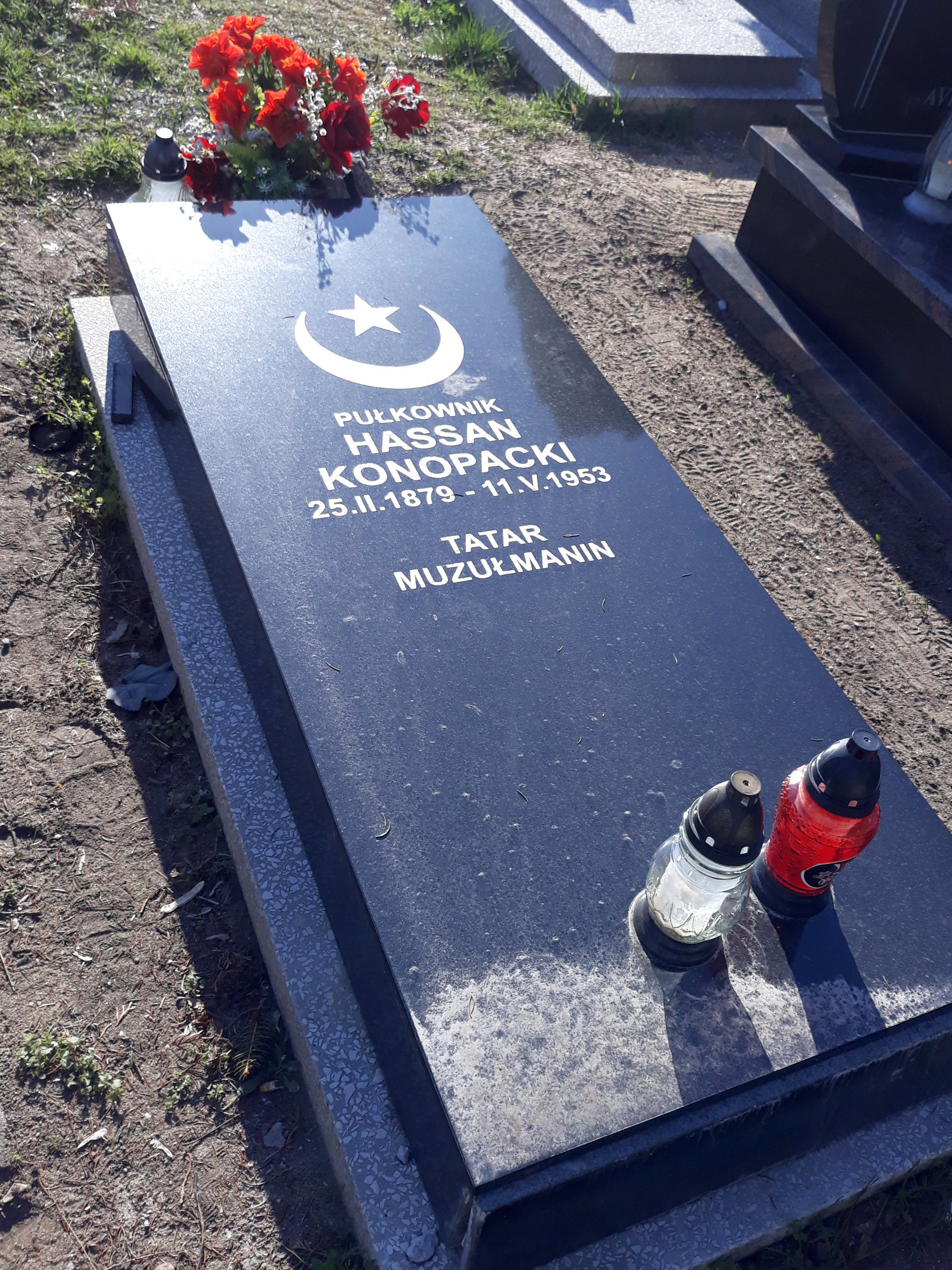
Hassan Konopacki tombstone in Bydgoszcz

During World War II, Hasan collaborated with the "Biełaruski Hołas" newspaper in Vilnius. Edited by Belarusian activist Makar Kraŭcoŭ, it supported the German occupying authorities. He chaired the parent committee of the Belarusian Gymnasium, where his son Maciej studied from 1941 to 1944. In 1944, he was arrested and taken to a prison in Minsk, suspected of having contact with Dr. Grabiński, a Belarusian activist in the run. Hasan consistently denied any link to this and was eventually released. In 1944–1945 in Vilnius, he worked, together with his son, at a power plant as an employee of the billing department.

=== Move to Poland ===
With Vilnius occupied by the Red Army in July 1944, Soviet colonel Mietelenka was billeted in the Konopackis' apartment. Appreciating his hosts, he warned them that they had a high probability of being deported to the East. He suggested, since they were Polish citizens, to volunteer for a "repatriation" transport back to Poland.

In July 1946, following the Polish population resettlements, the family transferred to Bydgoszcz. At the train station, they were looked after by Mr. and Mrs. Markovich, from the State Repatriation Office, who lived at Plac Wolności: momentarily housed in a barrack near Poznańska Square (at today's Św. Trójcy Street), they moved first at 41 Śniadeckich Street (November 8, 1946 to May 13, 1947) before living on the first floor of the tenement at 11 Mazowiecka street. At that time, Hasan was already weak from the travel and stays at several hospital to fight an atherosclerosis.

He died in this city on May 11, 1953. He was buried at the Communal Cemetery in Bydgoszcz at Kcyńska street.

== Family ==
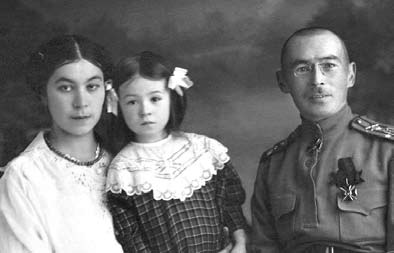
Helena, Tamara and Hassan Konopacki

Konopacki married Helena Ivanovna Ilyasewicz in 1910. Helena (1888–1987) was then 22 year old; she was related on her mother's side to the Achmatowicz, a rich Tatar family. The wedding occurred in Minsk and the witnesses were Bogdan Aleksandrowicz and Aleksander Ilyasewicz, a lieutenant-colonel from the 27th Artillery Brigade.

They had two children:

- a daughter, Tamara, born in April 1913, in Kaluga. She graduated during the interwar from the gymnasium "Eliza Orzeszkowa" in Vilnius. During WWII, she worked in a grocery store, where she used to give food to the partisans, thanks to fake vouchers. After being reported, she was arrested and jailed in Lukiškės Prison from 1944 to 1945. In Bydgoszcz, Tamara started working at the Provincial Food Cooperative (Polish: Wojewódzka Spółdzielnia Spożywców) and then at the city slaughterhouse (at today's 41–47 Jagiellońska Street) as an accountant. In 1943, she had a son, Zdzisław Bogdanowicz. He graduated in English from Kraków and currently (2011) lives in Switzerland.
- a son, Maciej (1926–2020).

=== Maciej Konopacki ===
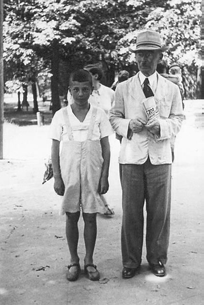
Young Maciej and Hassan Konopaccy in Vilnius

Maciej Musa Konopacki was born on January 29, 1926, in Vilnius. In his childhood, he was considerably influenced by the multi-ethnicity community life in the city (with Jewish, Karaite and Catholic neighbours). In September 1939, Maciej entered the Adam Mickiewicz Secondary School on Dominikańska Street. In 1941, German forces invaded and occupied the city: they allowed the opening of a Belarusian gymnasium on Ostrobramska Street, where he went until 1943. In 1944, Maciej developed dysentery and was hospitalized in a serious condition.

Once in Bydgoszcz (1946), he attended Bydgoszcz High School Nr.1 at 9 Plac Wolności, from where he graduated in 1948. He then started law studies in Toruń, commuting daily from Bydgoszcz. After completed his first year, he had to pause the second one due to illness. While still a student, Maciej attended Russian language courses and pedagogical courses. After six months, he started working as a teacher of Russian at the Pedagogical Secondary School.

In 1950–1951, he studied Russian at the Jagiellonian University in Kraków. The following year, he moved to the University of Warsaw to be closer to his ailing father in Bydgoszcz. He graduated in Russian studies in 1955. He turned to journalism: first in the news editorial office "PAP", then from 1956 to 1964 in Białystok's "Niwa", a weekly newspaper addressing the local Belarusian minority. In parallel, he began working with the Polish Radio Białystok (Polish: Polskie Radio Białystok), which on June 15, 1958, aired "Magazyn Belaruski", the first broadcast in Belarusian. He settled in Sopot in 1956: he worked as the press spokesman of the Gdańsk Shipyard "Lenin" from 1966 to 1972).

Maciej Konopacki was a researcher, historian and promoter of Tatar history. In particular, he was one of the precursors of a dialogue between Islam and the Catholic Church in Poland. He co-founded the "Museum of the Earth" (Polish: Muzeum Ziemi) in Sokółka, managing the Tatar department. He supported the development of a tourist route, called the "Tatar trail" (Polish: Szlak Tatarski), leading from Białystok to Sokółka. He was the Patriarch of the Polish Orient.

Maciej died on December 3, 2020, in Sopot.

== Awards and commemoration ==
Hasan Konopacki was awarded the following orders:

- for meritorious service during the Russian-Japanese war (1904–1905)
  - Order of Saint Anne, First Class;
  - Order of Saint Stanislaus, First Class;
- for meritorious service during World War I
  - Order of Saint Anne, Second Class;
  - Order of Saint Stanislaus, Second Class;
  - Order of Saint Vladimir, Fourth Class.

A commemorative plaque was set on the building where Hasan Konopacki lived, at 11 Mazowiecka street in Bydgoszcz. The unveiling ceremony took place on 25 September 2006, in presence of his son Maciej. During the event, a Muslim prayer was led by Imam Mahmud Taha Żuk.

== See also ==
- Bydgoszcz
- Lipka Tatars
- Yanka Kupala
- Russo-Japanese War
- Socialist Soviet Republic of Lithuania and Belorussia

== Bibliography ==
- (in Belarusian) Paszkoua, Hienadzia (1997). Энцыклапедыя гісторыі Беларусі T.4, Кадэты – Ляшчэня. Mińsk: Беларуская Энцыклапедыя імя Петруся Броўкі. p. 432. ISBN 9851101419.
- (in Polish) Głogowska, Helena (1994). Hassan Konopacki – Tatarski dowódca białoruskiego wojska. Białoruskie Zeszyty Historyczne Nr 1. Białystok: Białoruskie Towarzystwo Historyczne. pp. 162–168.
- (in Polish) Berger, Rafał (2011). Hassan Konopacki-Tatar, muzułmanin, bydgoszczanin. Warsaw: STOWARZYSZENIE JEDNOŚCI MUZUŁMAŃSKIEJ INSTYTUT MUZUŁMAŃSKI. ISBN 9788392166269.
- (in Polish) Radziszewska, Iwona (2016). Maciej Musa Konopacki (ur. 1926) – nasz Tatar. LITTERARIA COPERNICANA. Toruń: Uniwersytet Mikołaja Kopernika w Toruniu. pp. 189–197.
