= Antoni Owsianik =

Belarusian politician, national activist and engineer

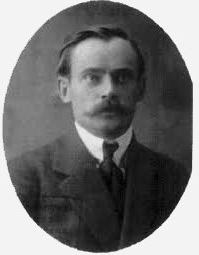

Member of the first term of the Sejm
- In office November 3, 1922 – November 27, 1927
- Parliamentary group: Belarusian Parliamentary Club

Member of the People's Secretariat of Belarus
- In office 1918–1919
- Parliamentary group: Belarusian Socialist Assembly; Belarusian Party of Socialists-Federalists

Member of Rada of the Belarusian Democratic Republic
- In office April 3, 1918 – 1919
- Parliamentary group: Belarusian Socialist Assembly; Belarusian Party of Socialists-Federalists

Personal details
- Born: June 13, 1888 Kobyle
- Died: 1933 Soviet Union

Antoni Owsianik (Note: In Polish-language literature he also appears as Antoni Owsiennik (Grzybowski (2006, p. 65)).) (Belarusian: Антон Аўсянік, romanized: Anton Ausianik; born 13 June 1888 in Kobyle, Vilna County, died in 1933 in the Soviet Union) was a leftist politician, national activist, and engineer of Belarusian nationality, a state activist of the Belarusian Democratic Republic, from 1918 to 1919 a member of the Rada of the Belarusian Democratic Republic, the Presidium of the Belarusian Democratic Republic Council, the Convention of Seniors of the Belarusian Democratic Republic Council, and the People's Secretariat of Belarus; one of the initiators of the creation of Belarusian military units within the Polish Armed Forces, from 1919 to 1920 a member, and later vice-chairman, of the temporary presidium of the Belarusian Military Commission; in 1920 a plenipotentiary representative of the Belarusian Democratic Republic in the Republic of Lithuania; a representative of the Belarusian national minority in the Second Polish Republic, from 1922 a deputy to the Sejm of the Republic of Poland in its first term. In the 1930s he moved to the Byelorussian Soviet Socialist Republic, was arrested and probably killed by order of the Soviet authorities.

== Early life ==
Antoni Owsianik was born on 13 June 1888 in the village of Kobyle, Olkowice commune, Vilna County, Minsk Governorate, in the Russian Empire (Note: In Polish historiography, this area is also referred to as the "partitioned lands" or more broadly as the "Russian Partition".) (now the village of Kastrychnitskaya, Vilyeyka District, Minsk Region, Belarus). He came from a peasant family and attended local schools. He graduated from the Technological Institute in Kharkiv and then studied at the Faculty of Shipbuilding at the Saint Petersburg Polytechnic Institute (according to some sources, he graduated from this institution). He obtained the title of engineer. While in Saint Petersburg, he joined the Belarusian Socialist Assembly and became involved in the Belarusian national movement. For several years, he worked in Babruysk, creating Belarusian social and political organizations there. He participated in the selection of delegates to the First All-Belarusian Congress, and according to one source, he was also a participant in it in December 1917.

=== Belarusian Democratic Republic ===
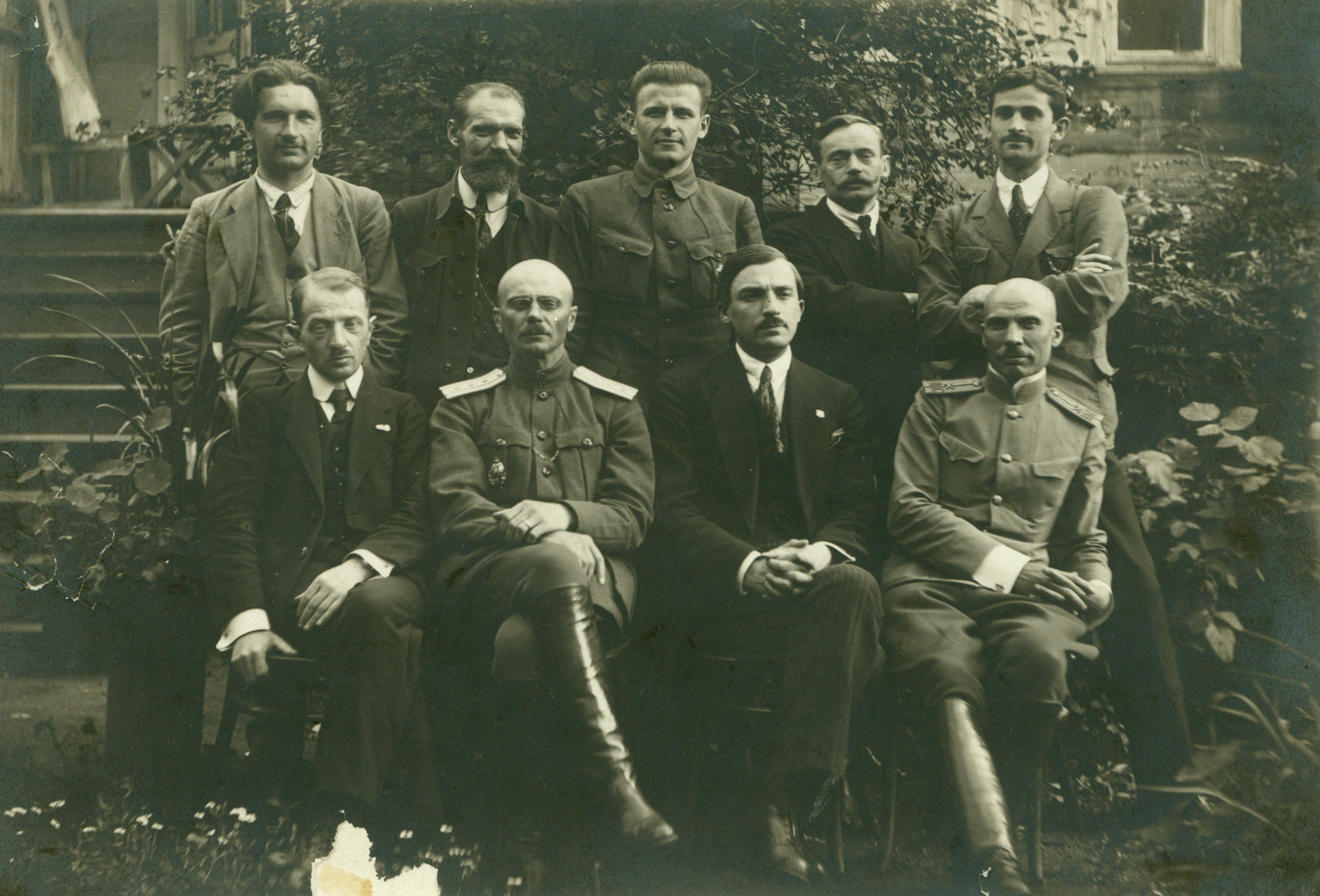
People's Secretariat of Belarus; Antoni Owsianik second from the right in the back

On 3 April 1918, he became a member of the Rada of the Belarusian Democratic Republic as a delegate of the Babruysk District Council. Shortly afterward, he became a member of the Presidium of the Rada of the Belarusian Democratic Republic, and at the beginning of May, a member of the Convention of Seniors of the Rada of the Belarusian Democratic Republic. While serving on the Rada of the Belarusian Democratic Republic, he represented the Belarusian Local Councils. On 26 April 1918, his signature appeared on a telegram sent the following day on behalf of the government and the Rada of the Belarusian Democratic Republic to German Emperor Wilhelm II. The telegram expressed gratitude for the liberation of Belarus and requested support for the Belarusian Democratic Republic and its alliance with Germany. This move was very negatively received by left-wing, pro-Russian, and anti-German circles within the Belarusian Democratic Republic, leading to a significant number of council members leaving the Rada of the Belarusian Democratic Republic and the subsequent dissolution of the Belarusian Socialist Assembly.

After the split in the Belarusian Socialist Assembly, he became one of the leaders of the Belarusian Socialist-Federalist Party, a centrist party on the Belarusian Democratic Republic political scene. He was part of the so-called Bloc faction, which included the Belarusian Socialist-Federalist Party, the Belarusian Social Democratic Party, the Belarusian Socialist Assembly, and the Belarusian People's Socialist Party. He was a member of the Belarusian Democratic Republic delegation that traveled to Kyiv on 19 September 1918 for talks with the government of the Ukrainian State. The delegation sought official recognition of Belarusian Democratic Republic's independence by Ukraine, but received only expressions of goodwill and a promise of financial and military assistance in creating Belarusian armed forces. From 1918 to 1919, Antoni Owsianik was the chairman of the Belarusian Council in Babruysk and a member of the People's Secretariat of Belarus.

=== Belarusian Military Commission ===
On 19 September 1919, as a member of the Convention of Seniors of the Rada of the Belarusian Democratic Republic, he participated in a meeting with the Polish Chief of State Józef Piłsudski at the Nobility House in Minsk. During the meeting, the delegation asked Piłsudski to recognize the independence and integrity of the Belarusian Democratic Republic, allow the restoration of its organs, gradually transfer power to the Rada, provide a loan, form Belarusian military units alongside the Polish army, and jointly fight the Bolsheviks. The delegation did not receive any commitments from the Polish leader. At that time, Antoni Owsianik was a proponent of an agreement with Poland, the creation of a Belarusian army under Polish command, and discussions about forming a Belarusian-Polish federation, which he viewed purely pragmatically. In one of his letters to Anton Luckievich, he wrote:

What to do, how to deal with the Poles? (...) I think that now it is necessary to talk with the Poles about creating our national army. We can compromise. Let their higher command be. We can talk to them about the federation, we need to compromise, remembering one thing – we do everything for the independence of Belarus. You understand me, I think.

In mid-October 1919, he became part of the delegation of the Belarusian Central Council of Vilna and Grodno Regions, which went to Warsaw for talks with Polish authorities on Belarusian-Polish cooperation. (Note: In addition to Antoni Owsianik, the delegation included: Pavel Aleksiuk, Hasan Konopacki and Colonel Jakubowski.) The delegation presented the Polish side with a proposal to form a Belarusian division and nominations for members of the Belarusian Military Commission. On October 22, Antoni Owsianik was formally approved by Józef Piłsudski as a member of the Belarusian Military Commission. He represented Grodno Region in it.

There are indications that Antoni Owsianik, while a member of the Belarusian Military Commission, was not loyal to the Polish state. In the fall of 1919, an agreement was signed in Smolensk between the Bolsheviks and the Byelorussian Soviet Socialist Republic, under which the latter agreed to extend their influence on the Belarusian Military Commission. According to Belarusian historian Jerzy Grzybowski, Antoni Owsianik was one of the Byelorussian Soviet Socialist Republic supporters in the Belarusian Military Commission. According to reports from the Polish intelligence at the time, they allegedly hindered recruitment and favored former Red Army soldiers during it. They were also suspected of stirring anti-Polish sentiments among Belarusian soldiers and civilians through a network of district commands. However, the accusations made by the report directly against Antoni Owsianik only state that the Byelorussian Soviet Socialist Republic decided to contact him. According to historian Oleg Łatyszonek, this does not mean that Antoni Owsianik cooperated with them.

During the plenary session of the Belarusian Military Commission on 1 July 1920, Antoni Owsianik was one of six members who voted for the resignation of the entire commission and the adoption of a resolution addressed to Józef Piłsudski and the highest Belarusian institutions, stating that they do not feel capable of carrying out the heavy and responsible work of forming the Belarusian Army at this time. As a result of this decision, a crisis occurred within the Belarusian Military Commission; chairman Pawieł Aleksiuk resigned, and the six members who voted for the resolution formed a temporary Belarusian Military Commission presidium. Antoni Owsianik became its vice-chairman. On August 23, he resigned his duties as a Belarusian Military Commission member. On October 3, the Supreme Command of the Polish Army announced the acceptance of his resignation along with the entire current commission.

=== Activities in Lithuania, Central Lithuania, and Poland ===
In November 1920, he was the plenipotentiary representative of the Belarusian Democratic Republic in the Republic of Lithuania. He participated in talks between the emigrant government of the Belarusian Democratic Republic led by Vaclau Lastouski, who resided in Kaunas, and the Lithuanian authorities on forming Belarusian military units on its territory. After reaching an agreement on this matter, he oversaw the development of Belarusian units in Lithuania, which Lastouski's government intended to use against Poland in the event of a Lithuanian-Polish conflict.

In 1921, Antoni Owsianik moved to Vilnius, which was then the capital of Central Lithuania. This was due to the efforts of the Polish authorities to win over Belarusian activists centered around the Kaunas Belarusian Democratic Republic government. Jerzy Osmołowski and the Poland-aligned Belarusian State Committee were particularly influential in this decision. Until 1922, Antoni Owsianik worked on a rural estate. In 1922, he became a deputy to the Sejm of the Republic of Poland in its first term and was a member of the Belarusian Parliamentary Club. He was arrested by the Polish authorities. In the early 1930s, he emigrated to the Byelorussian Soviet Socialist Republic. In 1933, he was arrested by Soviet authorities. His subsequent fate is unknown.

== Bibliography ==
- Łatyszonek, Oleg (1995). Białoruskie formacje wojskowe 1917–1923 (in Polish). Białystok: Białoruskie Towarzystwo Historyczne. ISBN 83-903068-5-9.
- Grzybowski, Jerzy (2006). Białorusini w polskich regularnych formacjach wojskowych w latach 1918–1945. Seria Wschodnia (in Polish) (1 ed.). Warsaw: Instytut Studiów Politycznych Polskiej Akademii Nauk; Rytm. ISBN 978-83-7399-198-9.
- Michaluk, Dorota (2010). Białoruska Republika Ludowa 1918–1920. U podstaw białoruskiej państwowości (in Polish). Toruń: Wydawnictwo Naukowe Uniwersytetu Mikołaja Kopernika. ISBN 978-83-231-2484-9.
