= Bohoniki Mosque =

Mosque in Bohoniki, Podlaskie, Poland

- Meczet w Bohonikach
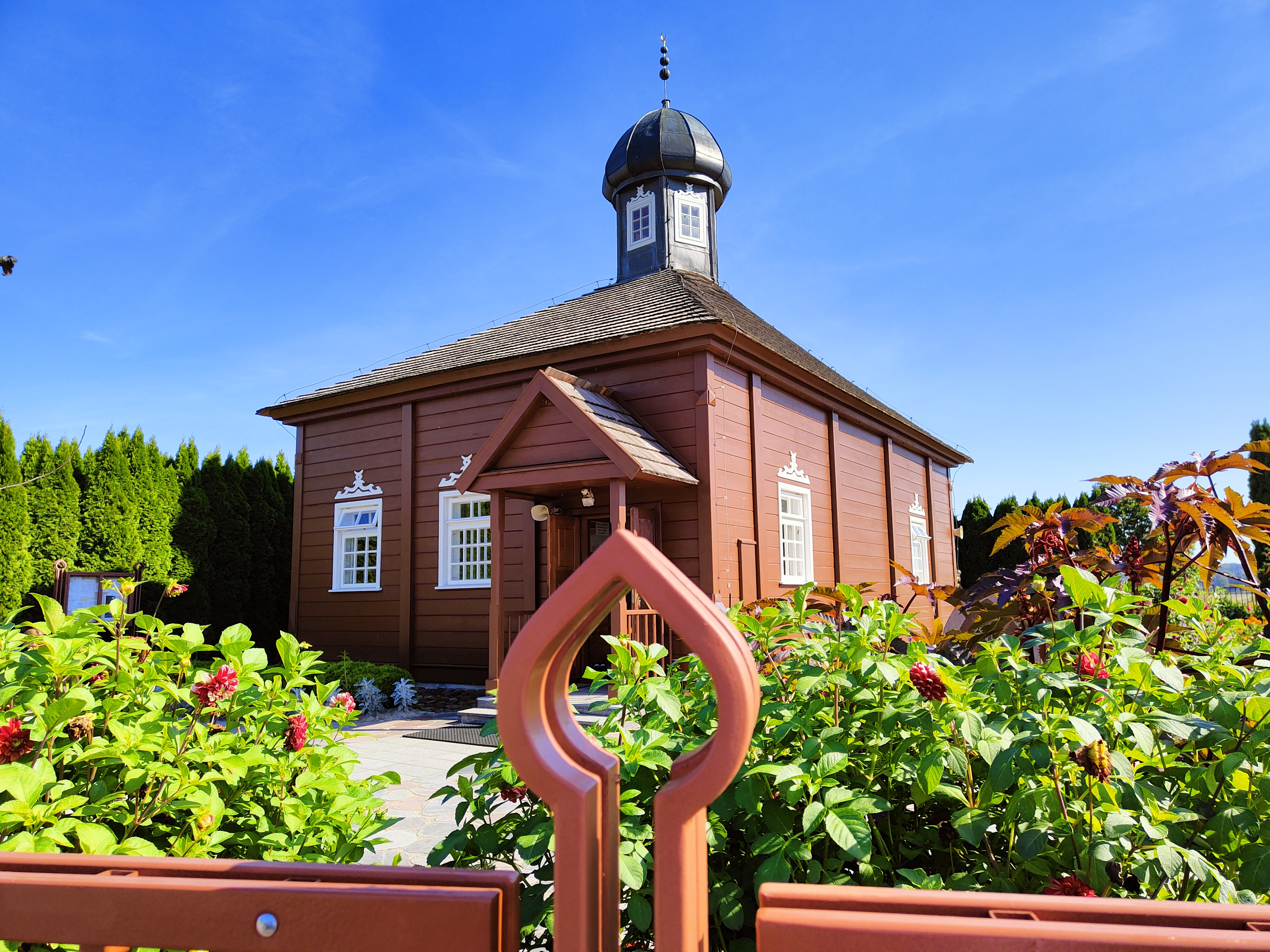
- The mosque in 2021

- Location within Podlaskie Voivodeship

Religion
- Affiliation: Islam
- Branch/tradition: Sunni

Location
- Location: Bohoniki, Podlaskie, Poland
- Interactive map of Bohoniki Mosque
- Coordinates: 53.3903°N 23.5917°E

Architecture
- Type: mosque
- Completed: 19th–20th century
- Historic Monument of Poland
- Designated: 2012-10-22
- Reference no.: Dz. U. z 2012 r. poz. 1275

Bohoniki Mosque (Polish: Meczet w Bohonikach) is a wooden mosque located in the village of Bohoniki, Podlaskie Voivodeship, in northeastern Poland.

== History ==
The mosque was built at the turning point of the nineteenth and twentieth-century, most likely in 1873. It was constructed after a fire burnt down a previous Tatar settlers' mosque in its location. The former mosque was located next to a historic cemetery in the eastern part of the village, existing since around the eighteenth-century, or from the seventeenth-century.

During World War II, the mosque was destroyed by the Wehrmacht, which transformed the building into a field hospital. After 1945, the mosque had undergone numerous small renovations. There were plans for the mosque's expansion, but the conservator did not allow these plans to be put forward.

In 2003, the mosque's roof was renovated; the sheet tin roof was replaced by shingle. In 2005, the mosque had undergone a major refurbishment.

== See also ==
- Islam in Poland
- Kruszyniany Mosque, another Lipka Tatar mosque in Poland
- Raižiai Mosque, Lipka Tatar mosque in Lithuania
- Navahrudak Mosque, Lipka Tatar mosque in Belarus
