= Navahrudak Mosque =

Mosque in Novogrudok, Grodno, Belarus

- Навагрудская мячэць
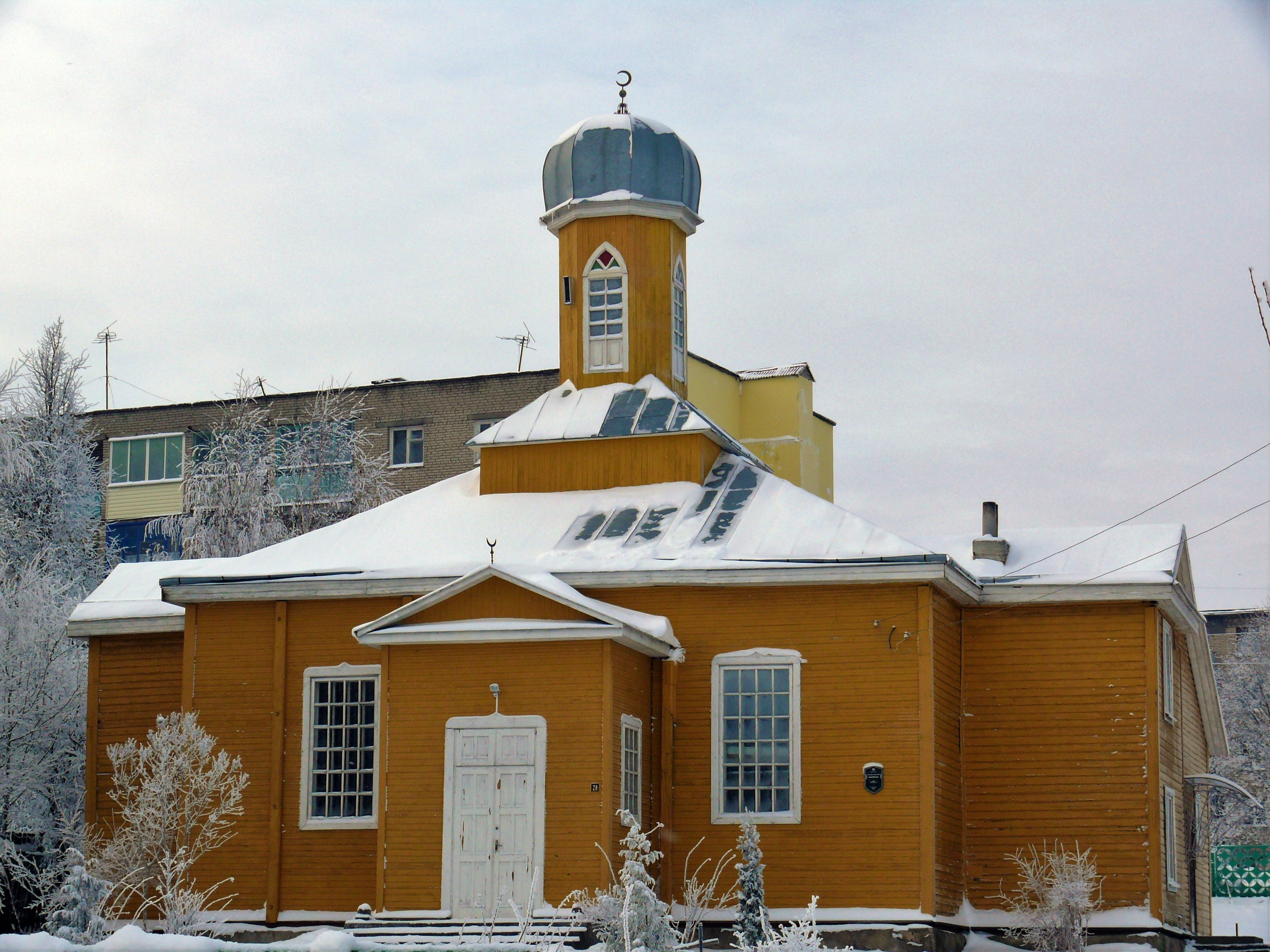

- Location within Belarus

Religion
- Affiliation: Sunni Islam

Location
- Location: Novogrudok, Grodno, Belarus
- Interactive map of Navahrudak Mosque
- Coordinates: 53°21′13″N 25°29′36″E

Architecture
- Type: mosque
- Completed: 1796
- Minaret: 1

Navahrudak Mosque (Belarusian: Навагрудская мячэць, Polish: Meczet w Nowogródku) is a wooden mosque located in Novogrudok, Grodno Region in Belarus.

It was the largest Lipka Tatar mosque in the Second Polish Republic. Following the 22 September 1929, it was the first mosque to be visited by a Polish senior state official - the Polish president, Ignacy Mościcki.

Following the Second World War, the mosque was transformed into a residential building (the minaret and tower were destroyed). During the 1990s, there were increasing efforts to rebuild the mosque, and it was reopened in 1997.

== See also ==
- Islam in Belarus
- Kruszyniany Mosque, Lipka Tatar mosque in Poland
- Raižiai Mosque, Lipka Tatar mosque in Lithuania
