= Bohoniki =

Village in Podlachia

Bohoniki بوـحـونيكي
- Village
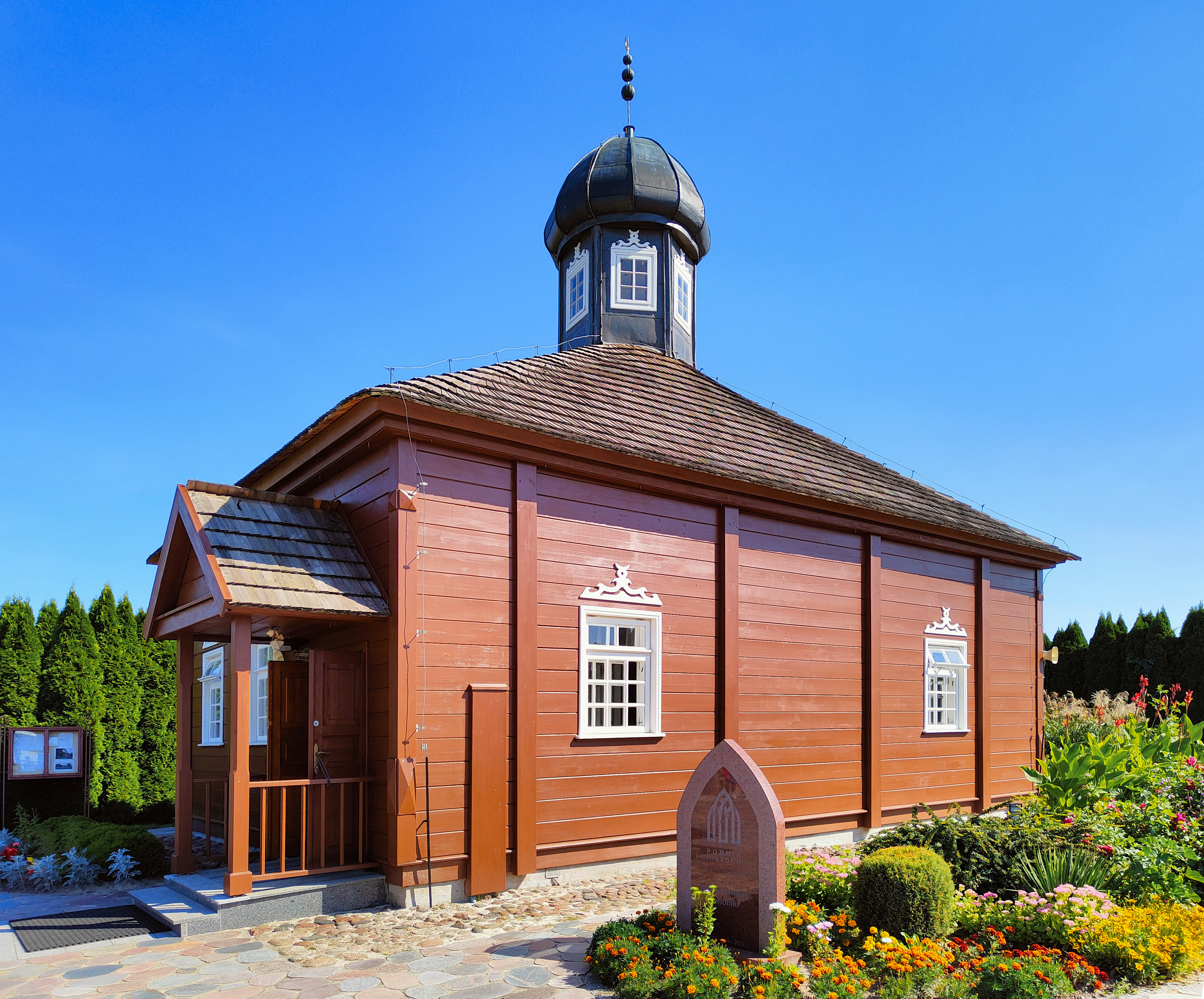
- Mosque in Bohoniki (2021)

- Location within Poland
- Coordinates: 53°23′N 23°36′E
- Country: Poland
- Voivodeship: Podlaskie
- County: Sokółka
- Gmina: Sokółka

Population
  - Total: 100
- Time zone: UTC+1 (CET)
  - Summer (DST): UTC+2 (CEST)
- Postal code: 16-100
- Vehicle registration: BSK

Bohoniki [bɔxɔˈniki] (Polish Arabic: بوـحـونيكي) is a village in the administrative district of Gmina Sokółka, within Sokółka County, Podlaskie Voivodeship, in north-eastern Poland, close to the border with Belarus.

== Demographics ==
Bohoniki was primarily a Lipka Tatar settlement. According to the 1921 census, the village had a population of 208, of which 99.5% declared Polish nationality, 84.1% were Roman Catholic and 12.5% Muslim by confession. Today, still a few families in the village are Tatars and practicing Muslims. Although residents don't speak their native Tatar language (often written in Latin, Cyrillic or Arabic alphabet), they have close ties to Lipka Tatar and Islamic traditions.

== Sights ==
Sites of interest in the village include a 19th-century wooden mosque and a Muslim cemetery, both named Historic Monuments of Poland (Pomnik historii), as designated November 20, 2012. Its listing is maintained by the National Heritage Board of Poland.

== Gallery ==
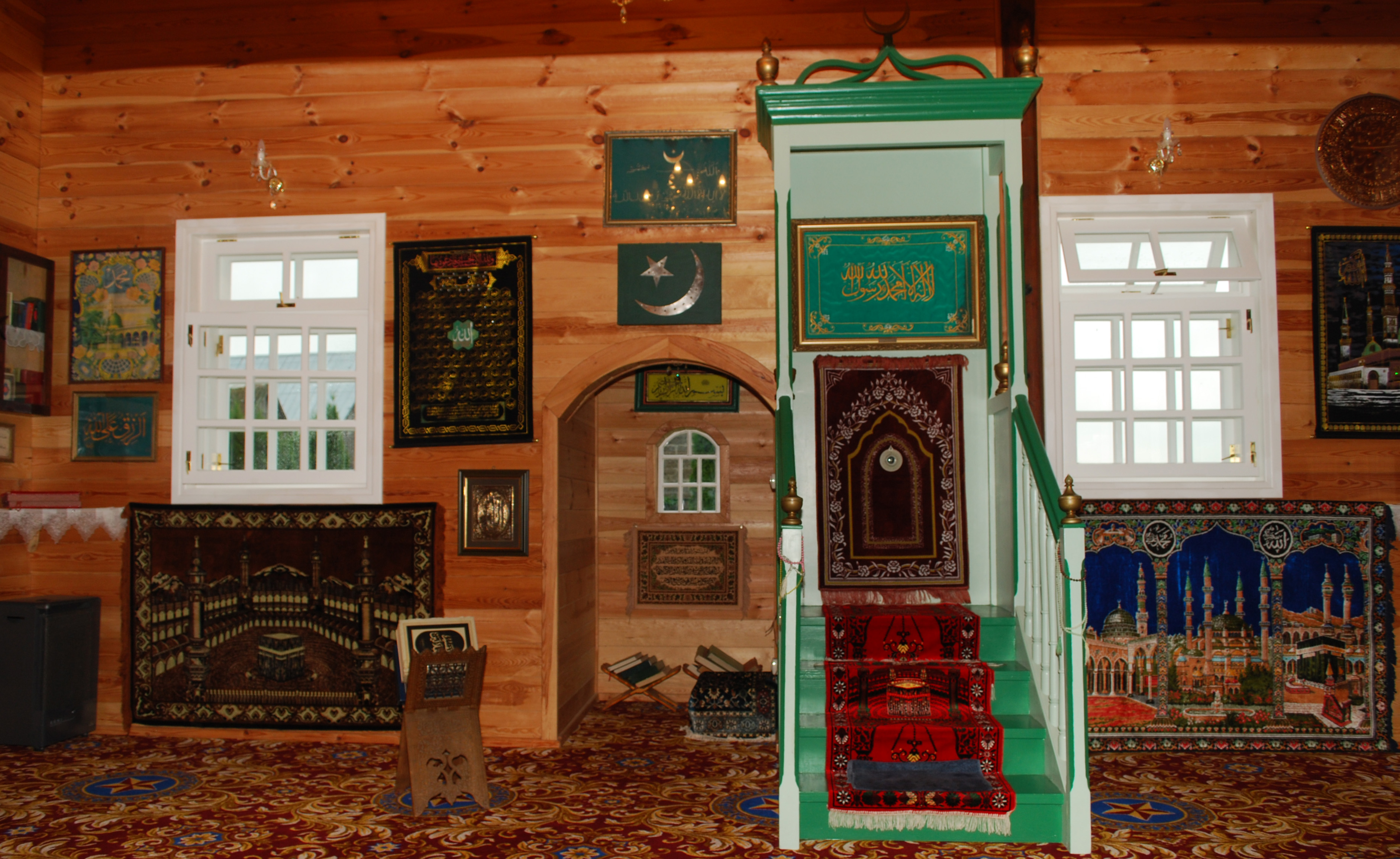
Mosque interior

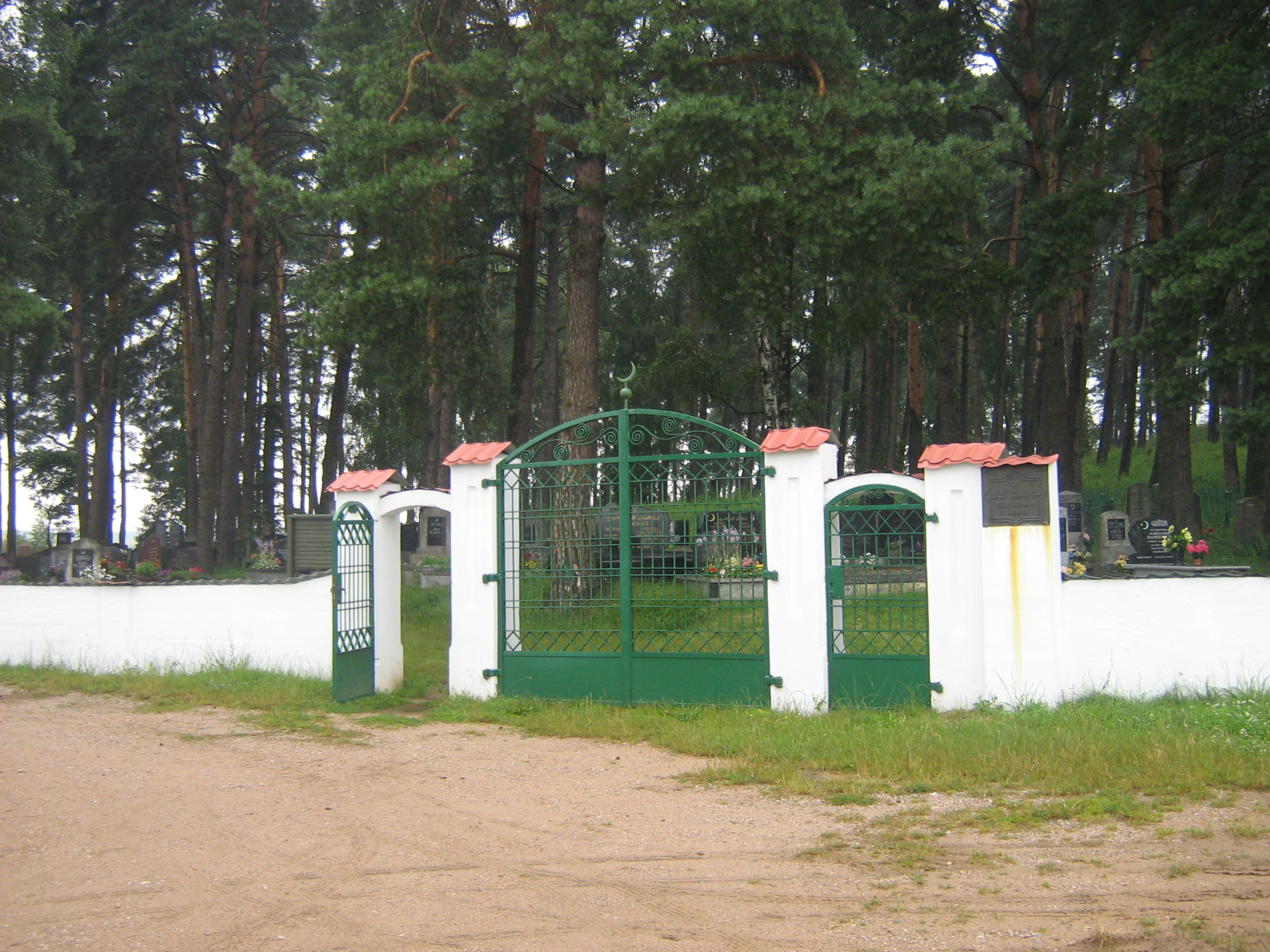
Cemetery entrance

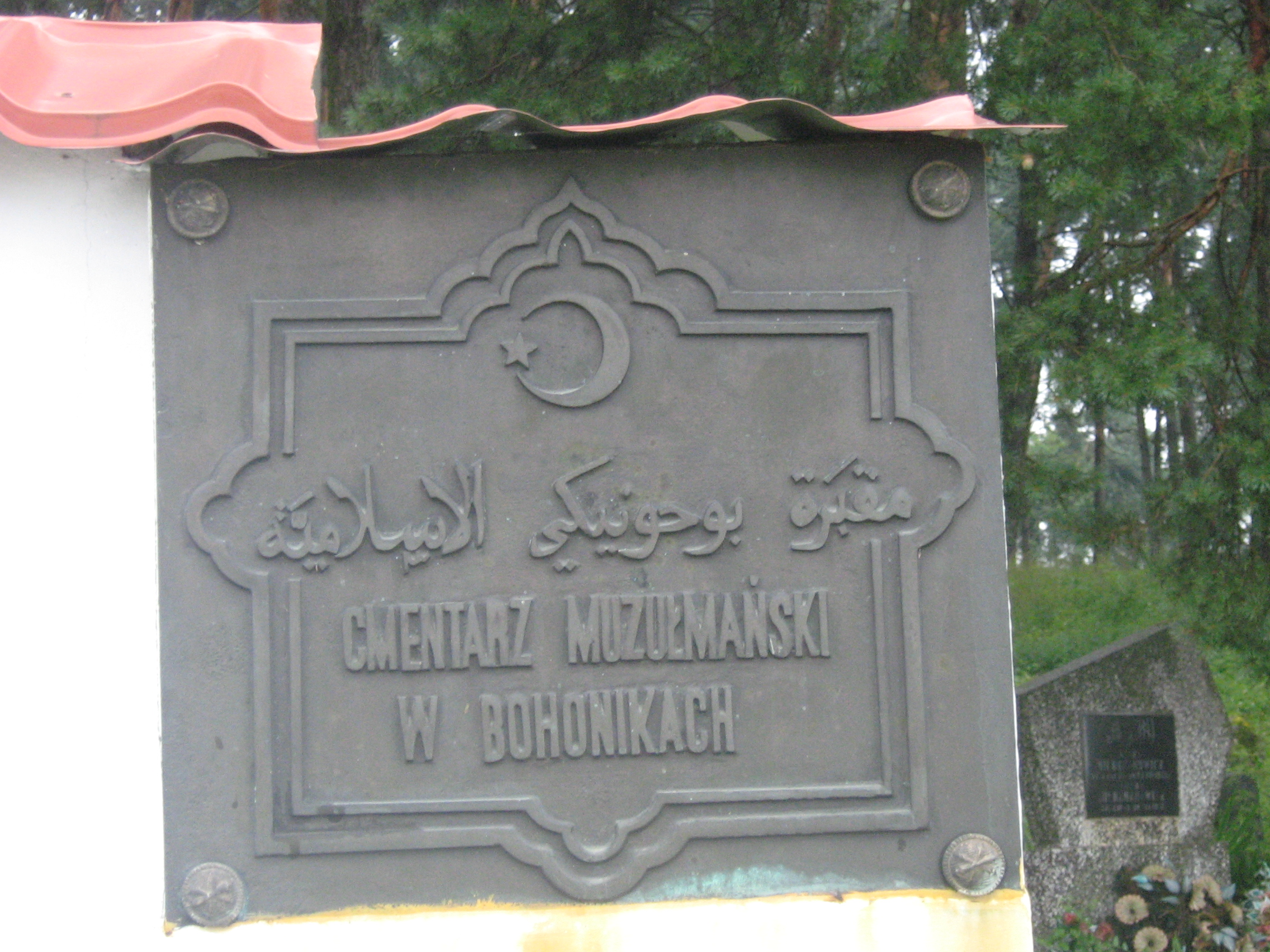
Muslim Lipka Tatar cemetery sign

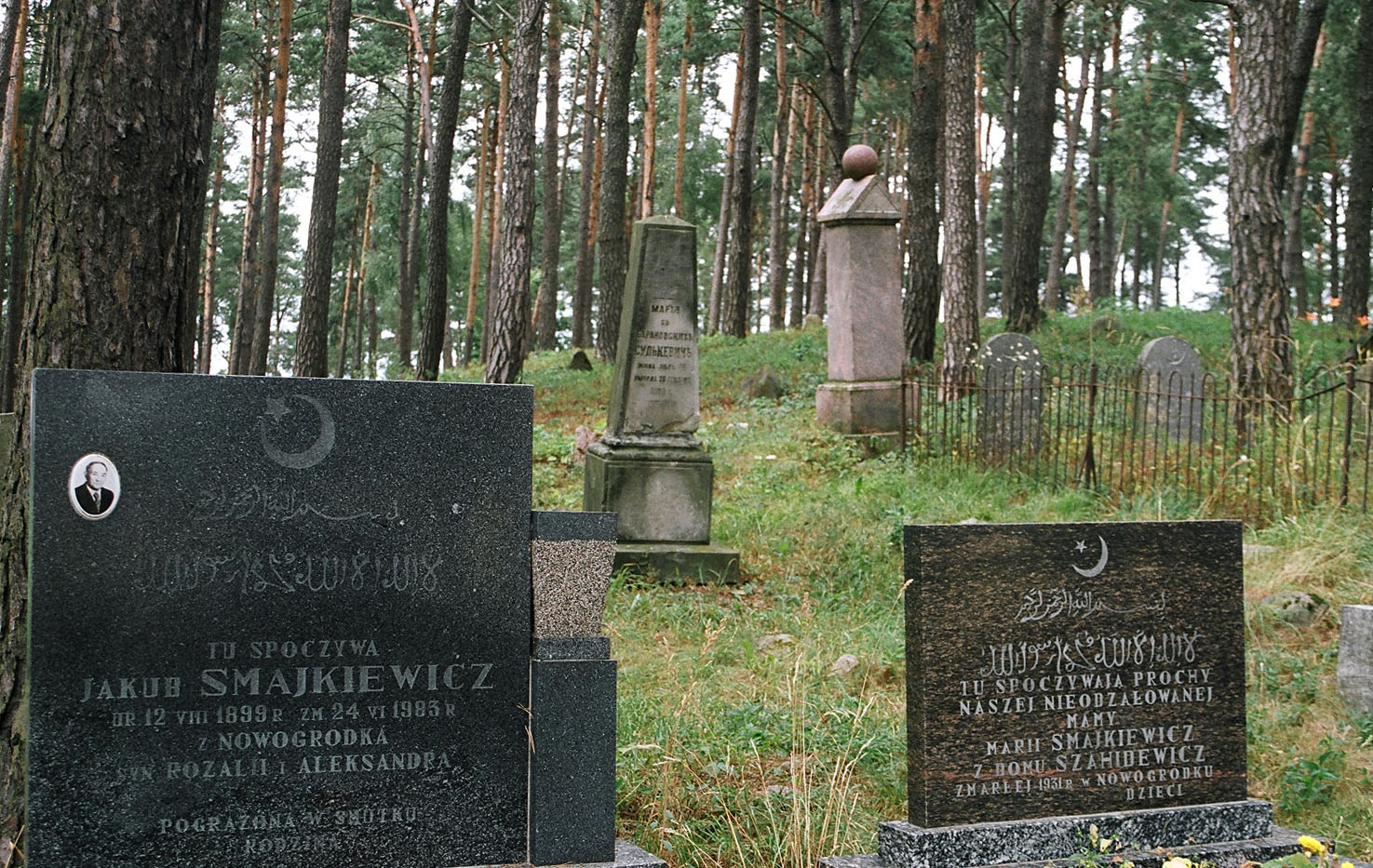
Cemetery

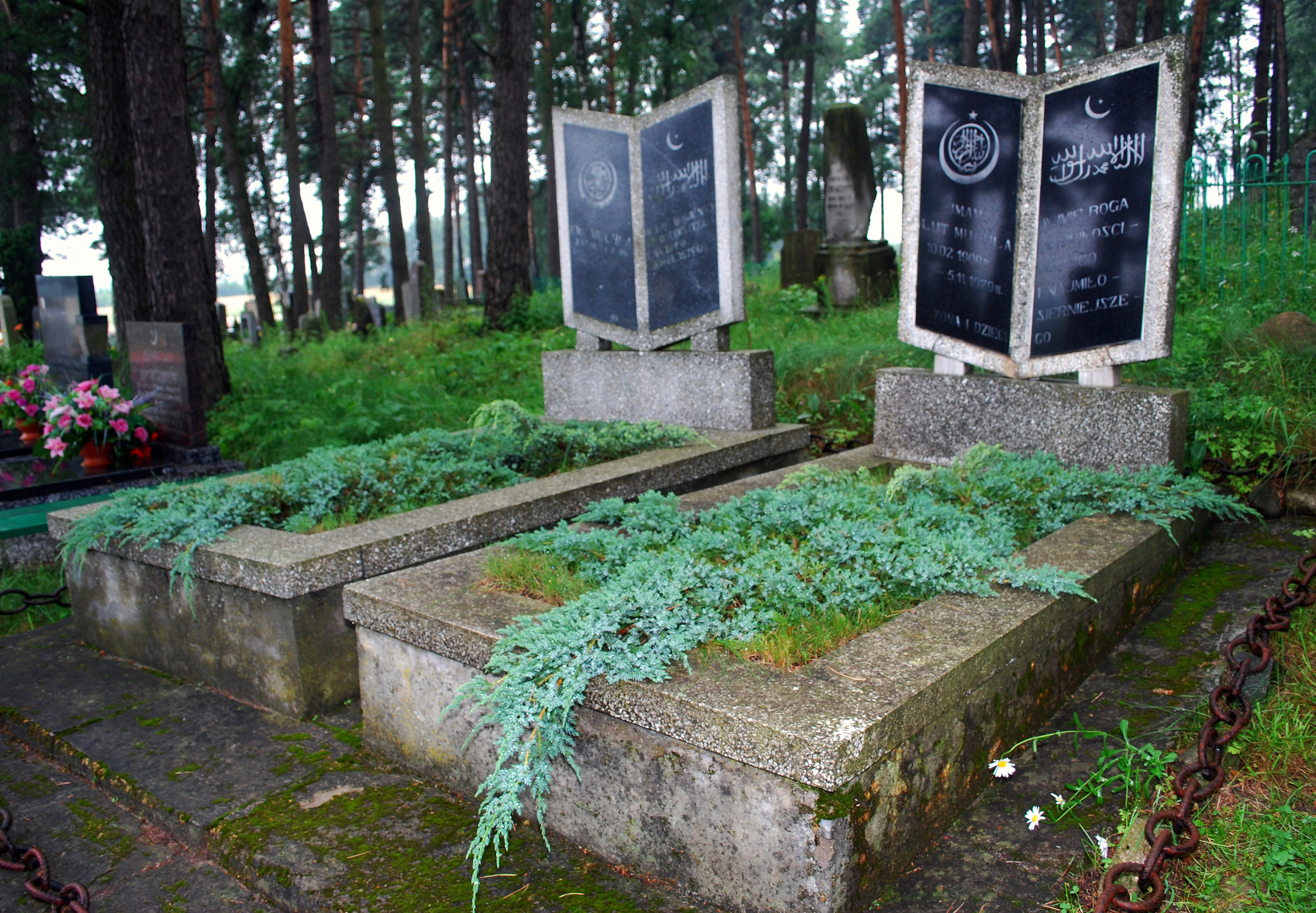
Cemetery

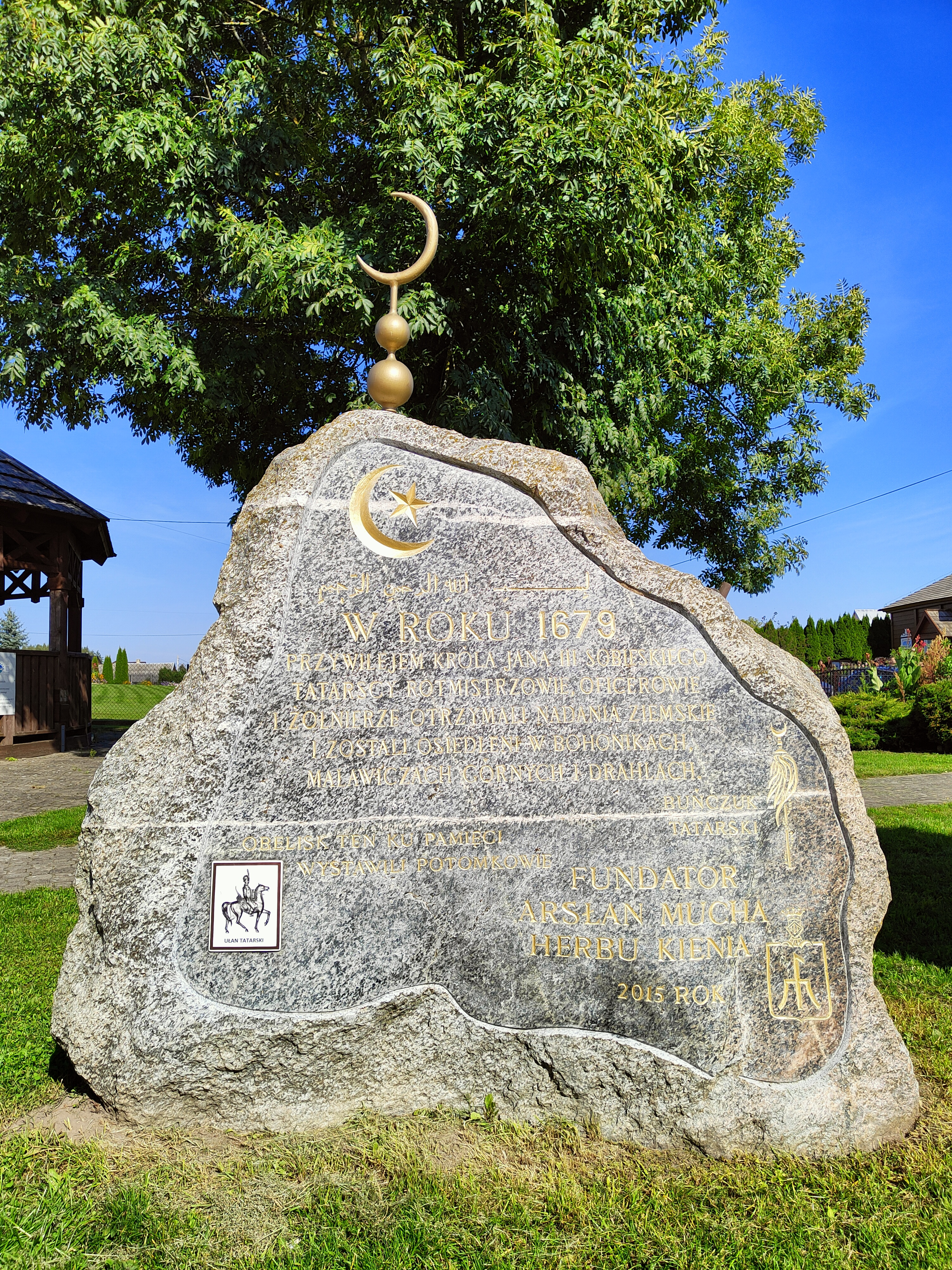
Monument commemorating the settlement of the Tatars in Bohoniki by King John III Sobieski
