= Kruszyniany =

Village in Podlachia

Kruszyniany كروشـنيانِ
- Village
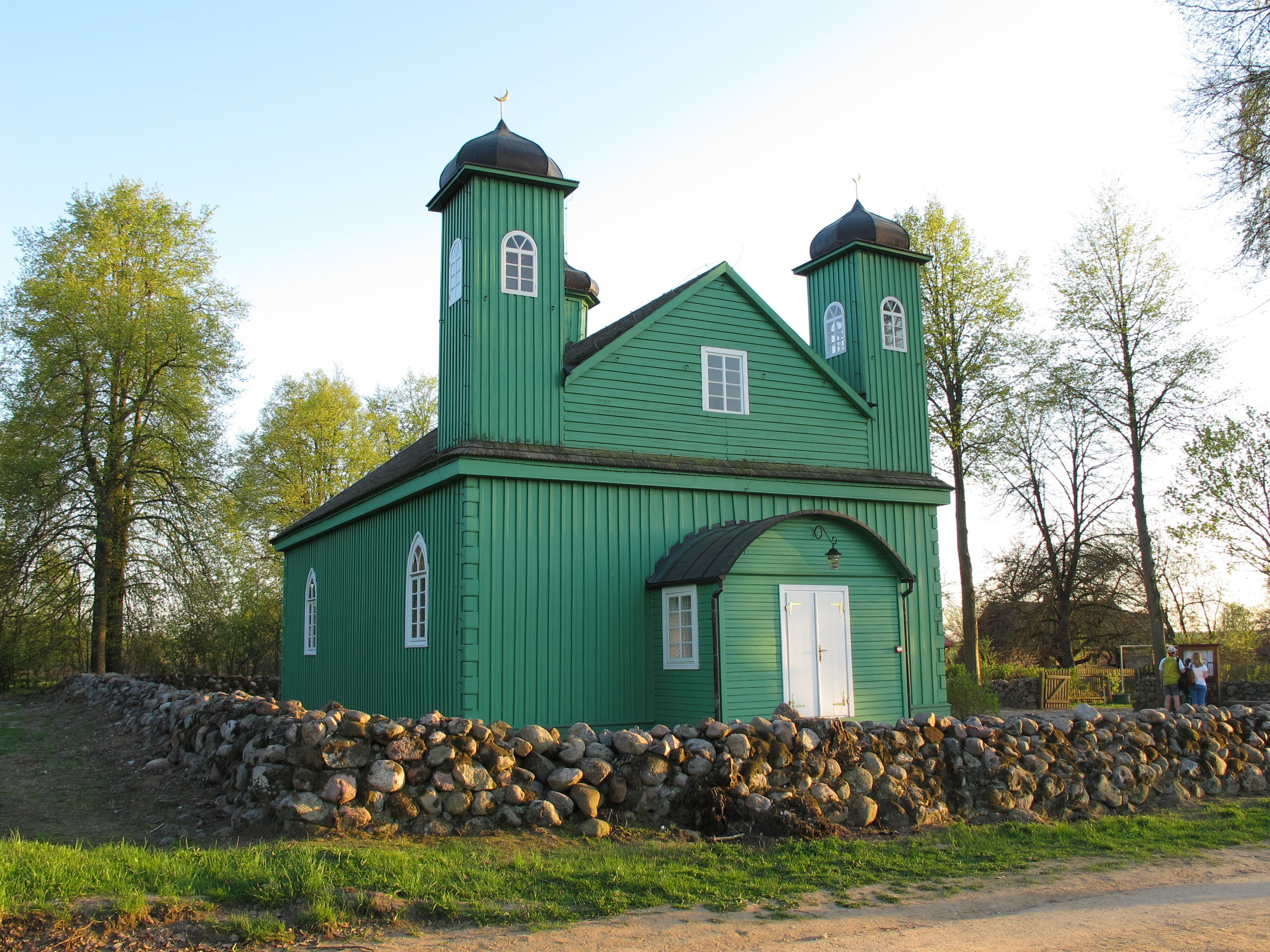
- Wooden Kruszyniany Mosque
- Interactive map of Kruszyniany
- Location within Poland
- Coordinates: 53°10′50″N 23°48′54″E
- Country: Poland
- Voivodeship: Podlaskie
- County: Sokółka
- Gmina: Krynki

Population
  - Total: 160
- Time zone: UTC+1 (CET)
  - Summer (DST): UTC+2 (CEST)
- Vehicle registration: BSK

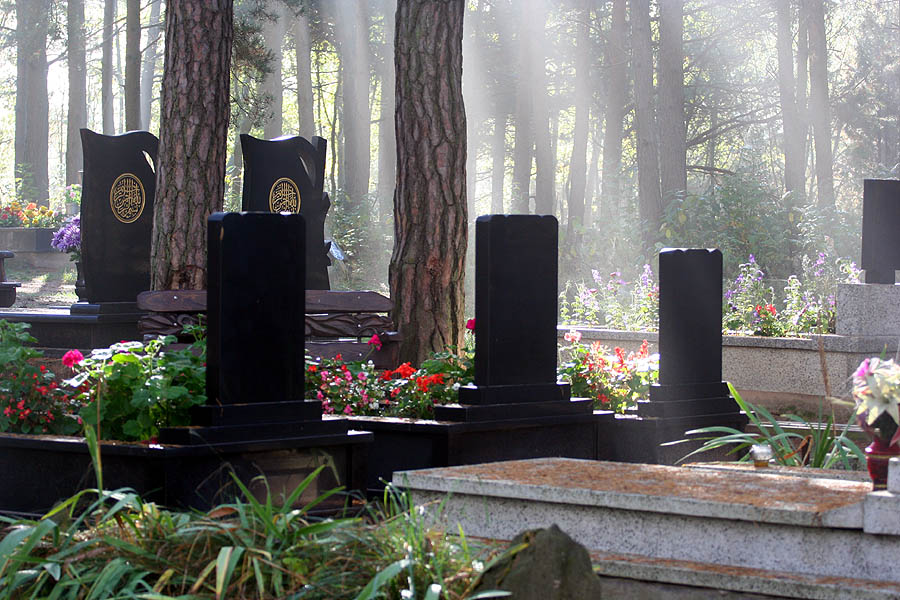
Tatar Cemetery

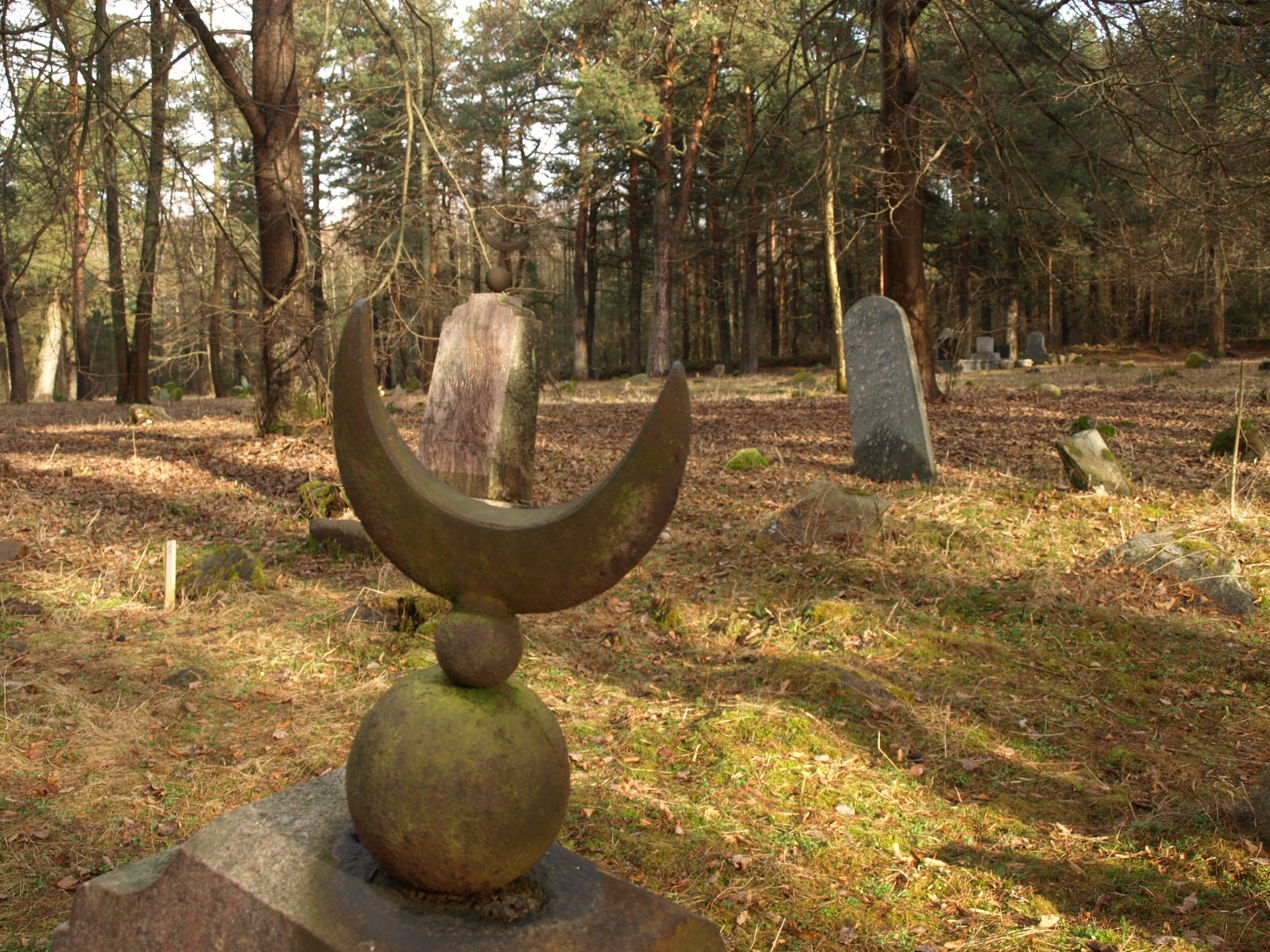
Kruszyniany cemetery.

Kruszyniany [kruʂɨˈɲanɨ] (Polish Arabic: كروـشـنيانِ) is a village in the administrative district of Gmina Krynki, within Sokółka County, Podlaskie Voivodeship, in north-eastern Poland, close to the border with Belarus.

In the past, the village was primarily a Lipka Tatar settlement. Up until this day, the Tatars still remain as the only minority in the village. The Tatars are Sunni Muslims. Sites of interest in the village include a wooden mosque from the 18th century (one of the two oldest in Poland), a Muslim cemetery, a Tatar centre and museum, and an Eastern Orthodox cemetery with an Orthodox church.

Around 1683, the Lipka Tatars were given land in Kruszyniany as a reward for aiding John III Sobieski in the Battle of Vienna and saving his life during the Battle of Párkány.

The village was named one of Poland's official national Historic Monuments (Pomnik historii), as designated November 20, 2012. Its listing is maintained by the National Heritage Board of Poland.
