= Kruszyniany Mosque =

Mosque in Kruszyniany, Podlaskie, Poland

- Meczet w Kruszynianach
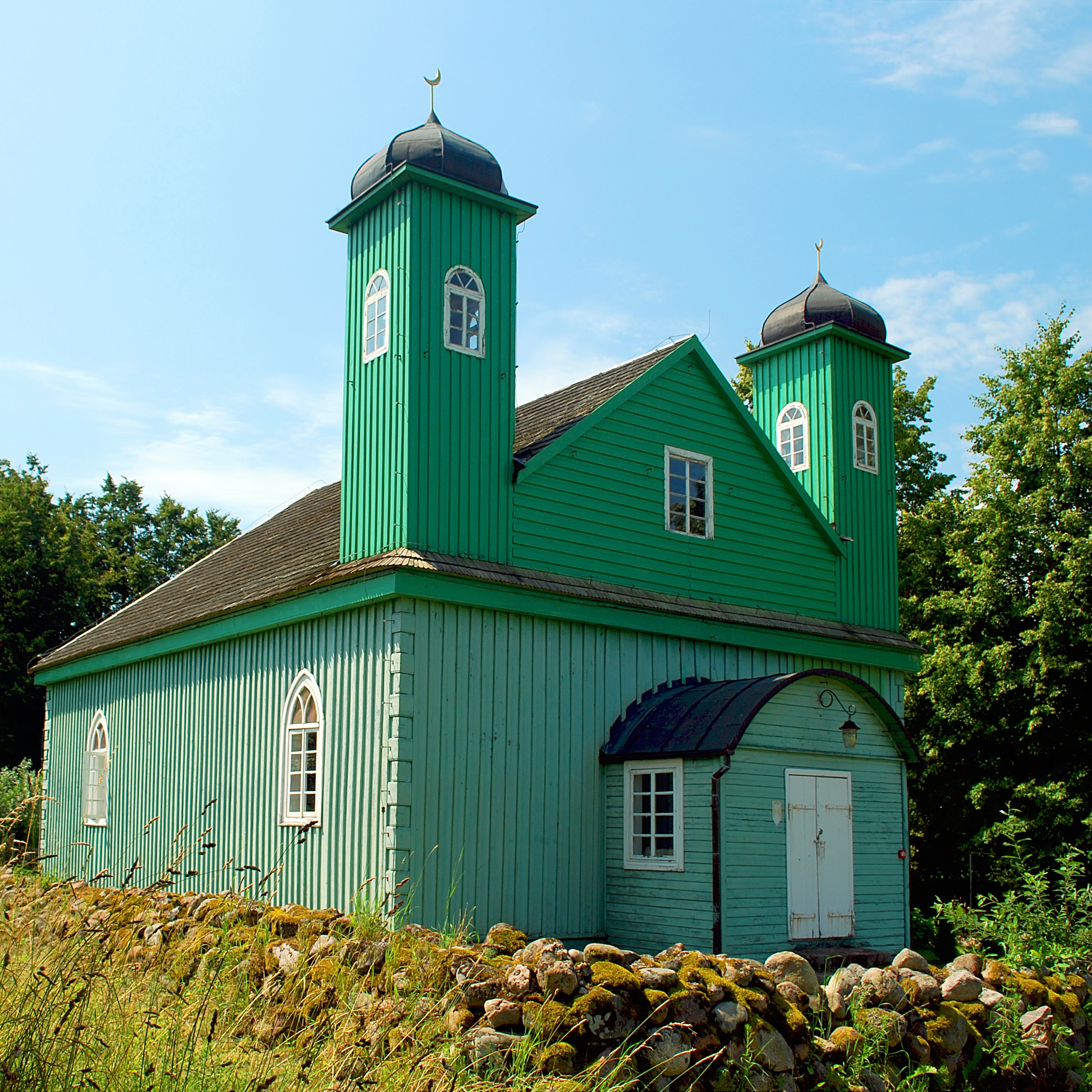

- Location within Podlaskie Voivodeship

Religion
- Affiliation: Islam
- Branch/tradition: Sunni

Location
- Location: Kruszyniany, Poland
- Interactive map of Kruszyniany Mosque
- Coordinates: 53.1764°N 23.8131°E

Architecture
- Type: mosque
- Completed: 18th-century
- Historic Monument of Poland
- Designated: 2012-10-22
- Reference no.: Dz. U. z 2012 r. poz. 1275

Kruszyniany Mosque is a wooden mosque located in the village of Kruszyniany, in Podlaskie Voivodeship, Poland. The building is the oldest Lipka Tatar mosque in Poland, built on the plan of a rectangle, in specifications of 10 by 13 metres.

== History ==
The village of Kruszyniany was assigned by King John III Sobieski to the Tatars who had participated on the side of the Polish–Lithuanian Commonwealth in the war against the Ottoman Empire. After the Lipka Tatar populace settled in the area, the Tatars built the mosque, which was first mentioned in a document dating back to 1717. The present mosque was most likely built in the second half of the eighteenth-century, or in the first half of the nineteenth-century (the exact date of construction of the building is unknown), on the site of the former mosque. In 1846, the building underwent renovation, information about which is found on a stone plaque, next to the women's entrance.

After World War II, the area was settled by repatriates and Muslims from modern-day Belarus. In 2008, with funding provided by the Ministry of Culture and National Heritage, the wooden building was fitted with a safety system.

Kruszyniany village was designated one of Poland's official national Historic Monuments (Pomnik historii) on November 20, 2012. Its listing is maintained by the National Heritage Board of Poland. In June 2014 the mosque was vandalized with abusive graffiti by unknown hooligans.

== Architecture ==
In its shape, the building resembles nearby wooden churches with two towers. It is built in the shape of a rectangle of 10 by 13 meters. On the inside and outside it is covered with wooden panels painted dark green (green is the color of Islam). On the north side, the building is decorated with two towers similarly covered with wood. On the ridge of the roof stands a third tower, windowless and smaller than the others; it is somewhat closer to the mihrab (the niche in the wall indicating the direction of Mecca). The roof of each large tower, and that of the small tower, is shaped like a flattened helmet, with a crescent moon atop a point at the center. The roof of the main part of the building is covered with shingles.

The interior is divided into two sections, one for women and the other for men. The women's entrance is placed along the building's main axis. Above it is a triangular tympanum, on whose sides are the two towers. The men's entrance is on the side. The women's section is substantially smaller than the men's prayer hall and is separated from the men's section by a wooden partition, from which, at the height of about 1 meter, a section running the length of the room is cut out and covered by a transparent white curtain. In the wall at the front of the men's prayer hall, pointing southeast toward the Mecca, is a small niche, the mihrab, in which the sacred books are kept.

The interior is decorated with rugs, and the walls are decorated with calligraphic quotes from the Quran.

=== Gallery ===
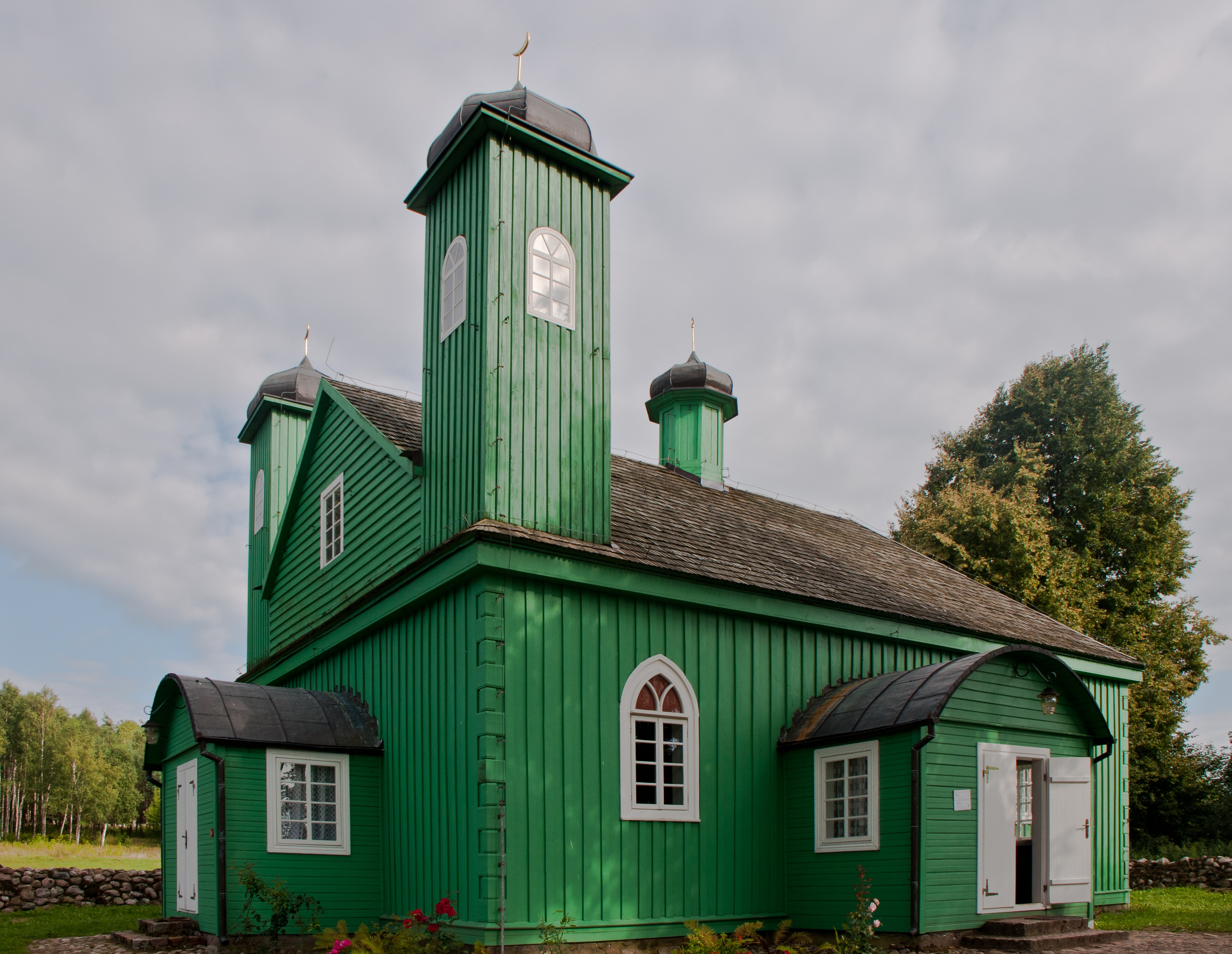
The side of the mosque, with the men's entrance

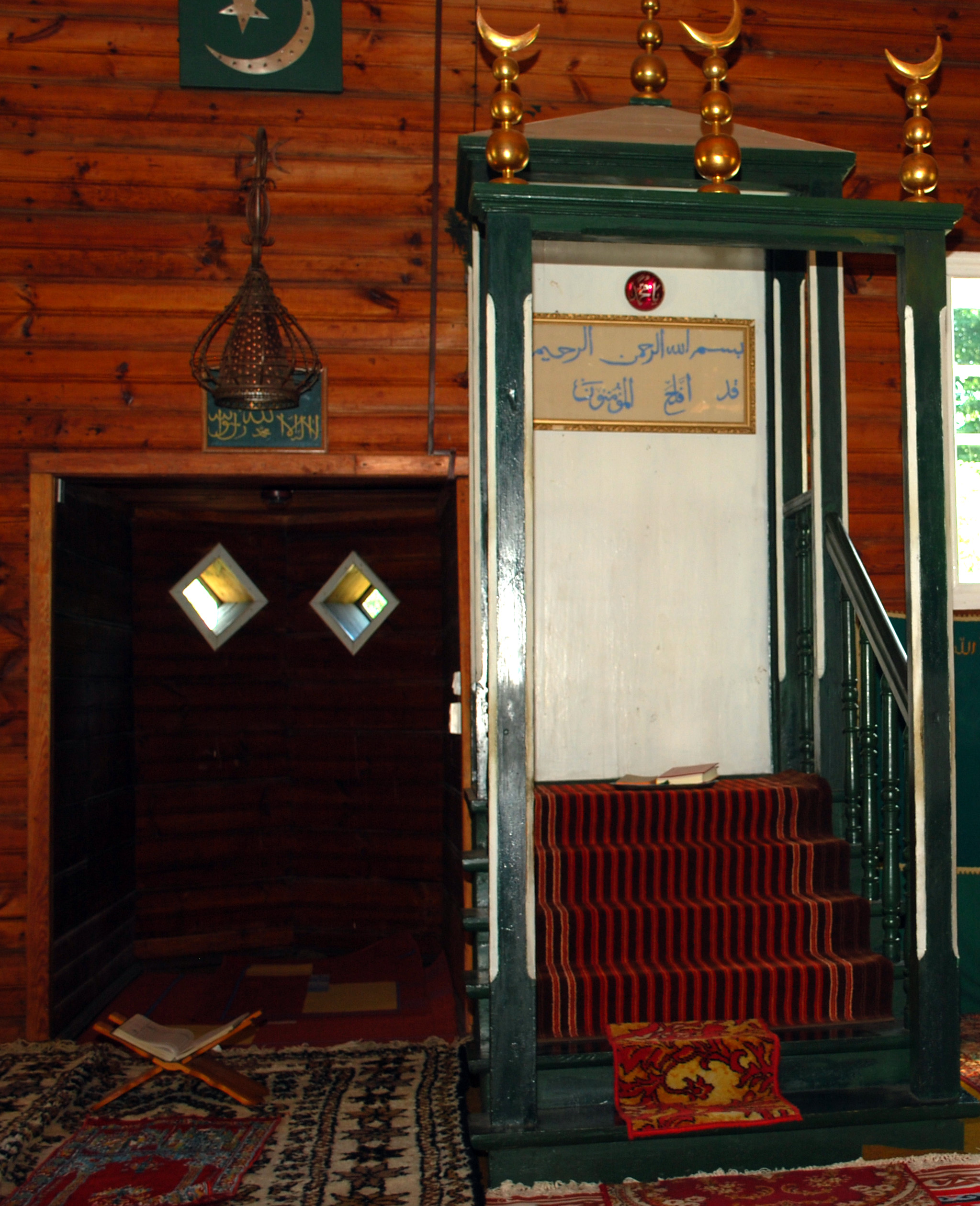
The minbar and mihrab

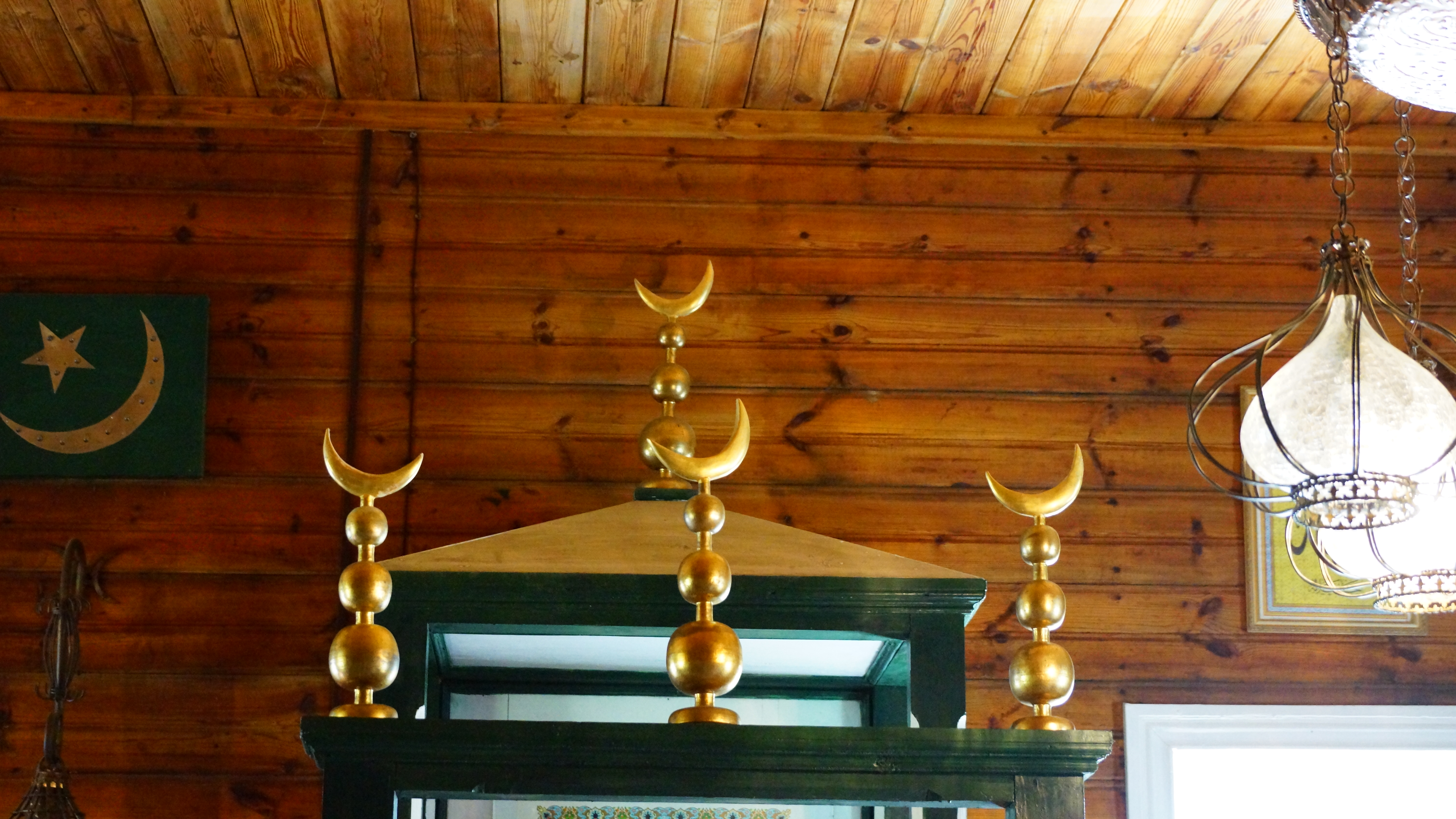
The decorations atop the minbar

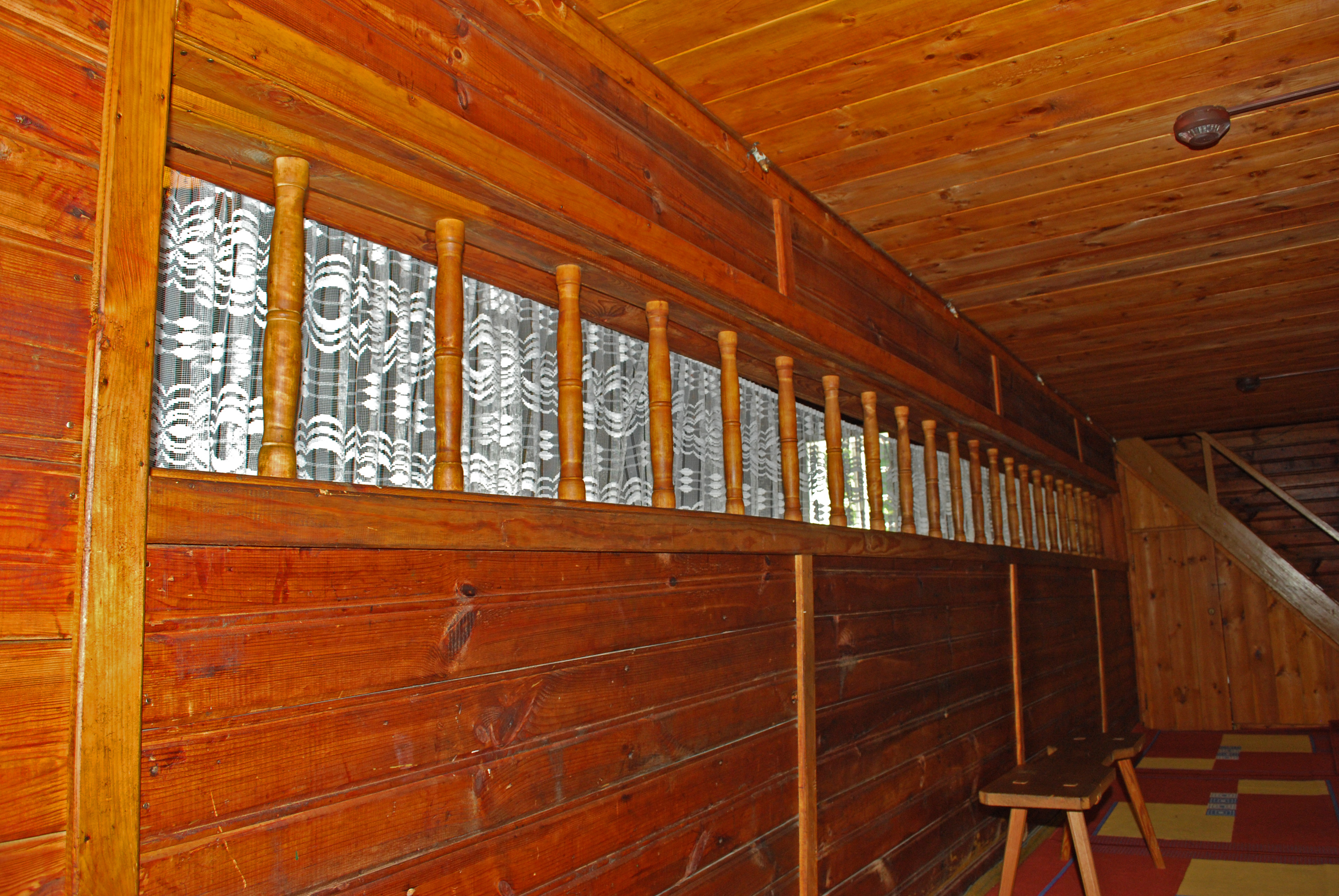
The wall dividing the men's and women's sections

== See also ==
- Islam in Poland
- Bohoniki Mosque, another Lipka Tatar mosque in Poland
- Raižiai Mosque, Lipka Tatar mosque in Lithuania
- Navahrudak Mosque, Lipka Tatar mosque in Belarus
