= Raižiai Mosque =

Mosque in Alytus County, Lithuania

- Lithuanian: Raižių mečetė
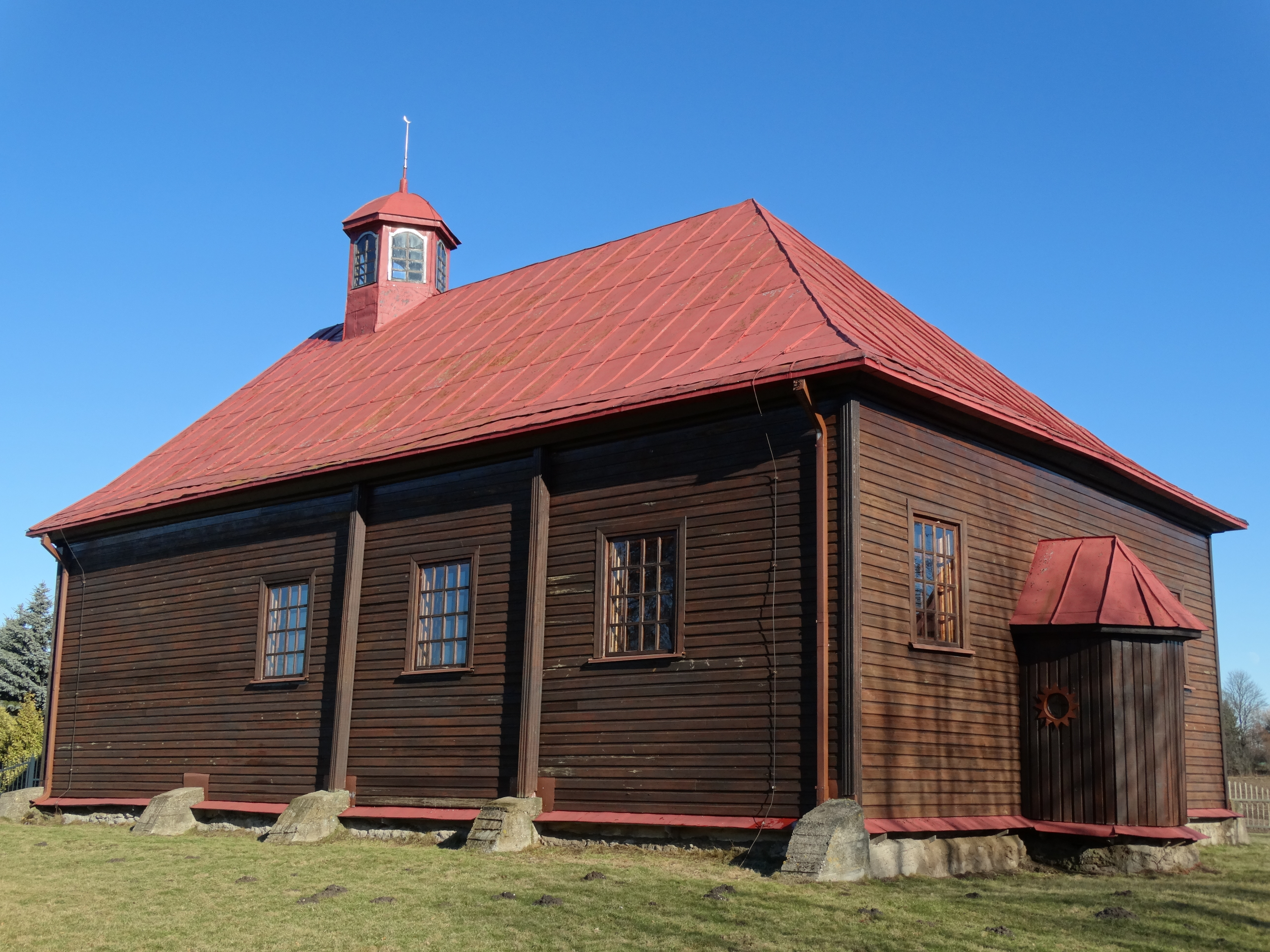
- The mosque in 2016

- Location of the mosque in Lithuania

Religion
- Affiliation: Sunni Islam
- Ecclesiastical or organizational status: Mosque
- Status: Active

Location
- Location: Raižiai, Alytus County
- Country: Lithuania
- Interactive map of Raižiai Mosque
- Coordinates: 54°28′47″N 24°11′16″E

Architecture
- Type: Mosque architecture
- Founder: Lipka Tatars
- Completed: 1663 (first mention); 1889 (current structure)

The Raižiai Mosque (Lithuanian: Raižių mečetė) is a Sunni Islam wooden mosque, located in the village of Raižiai, in the Alytus County of Lithuania. The mosque was the only one to operate during the Soviet era. The mosque is active, with local Muslim religious gatherings during major holidays. The mosque serves as a center for activities for the 500 Tatars that live in the village.

Since 1999, the mosque has been designated a cultural heritage site (unique code 24828). In the village of Raižiai there are several Tatar cemeteries, where Lipka Tatars and Muslims, of other nationalities, are buried.

== History ==
The mosque was first mentioned in sources dated from 1663, the current mosque was built in 1889; and renovated in 1993. The mosque houses the oldest remaining minbar from the Polish-Lithuanian Commonwealth, that was built 1686.

In 2010, to commemorate the 500th anniversary of the Battle of Grunwald, two sundials were installed near the mosque (constructed by Jonas Navikas), one of which shows the local time; the second sundial shows the time in Grunwald, Poland.

== See also ==
- Islam in Lithuania
- List of mosques in Lithuania
- Kruszyniany Mosque, in Poland
- Navahrudak Mosque, in Belarus
