= Oleg Łatyszonek =

Belarusian Polish historian

Oleg Łatyszonek Aleh Latyshonak
- Citizenship: Poland
- Occupations: historian, activist of the Belarusian minority in Poland
- Awards: Belarusian Democratic Republic 100th Jubilee Medal (2018)

Oleg Łatyszonek (Belarusian: Алег Латышонак, Aleh Latyshonak) (born May 27, 1957 in Elbląg) is a historian from Białystok, Poland, of Belarusian ancestry. His interests and his Ph.D. are the research of early cultural identity of Belarusians and the building of the Belarusian nation. He is with the Department of Belarusian Culture, University of Białystok.

Oleg Latyszonek was involved with the "Solidarity" political movement in 1980s and was imprisoned for assistance in publishing of illegal bulletins. In post-Communist Poland, Łatyszonek has been involved in setting up the Belarusian minority movement, the Association of Belarusians in Poland. He is one of the founders of the Belarusian Historical Society, Poland.

Łatyszonek is the driving force of the Radio Racja radio station that broadcasts from Bialystok in Belarusian language targeting the Belarusians in both in Poland and Belarus, as well as the Polish minority in Belarus.

In 2008, he was awarded the Knight's Cross of the Order of Polonia Restituta.

== Works ==
- „Bialoruskie formacje wojskowe 1917-1923” ["Belarusian Military Units 1917-1923"], Bialystok, 1995, ISBN 83-903068-5-9 (in Polish) (book review, in Belarusian)
- (With E. Mironowicz) „Historia Bialorusi od polowy XVIII do konca XX wieku” ["History of Belarus from the Mid-18th to the End of the 20th Century"], Bialystok, 2002 (in Polish) (book review, in Belarusian)
- "From White Rus to Belarus", in: Annus Albaruthenicus, no. 5, 2004.
