= Islam in Belarus =

Belarusian Muslims
- A flag of Lipka Tatars in Belarus

Total population
- 8,445 (2019 census)

Regions with significant populations
- Ivye, Minsk

Religions
- Sunni Islam (majority); Sufism, Salafism, Shia (minority)

Languages
- Belarusian (Belarusian Arabic alphabet)

Related ethnic groups
- Belarusians, Lipka Tatars

Islam in Europe by percentage of country population 95–100%: Azerbaijan; 90–95%: Turkey; Kosovo; 50–70%: Albania; Bosnia and Herzegovina; Kazakhstan; 30–35%: North Macedonia; 10–20%: France; Georgia; Montenegro; 5–10%: Austria; Belgium; Bulgaria; Denmark; Germany; Liechtenstein; Luxembourg; Netherlands; Russia; Sweden; Switzerland; United Kingdom; Spain; Greece; 4–5%: Serbia; 2–4%: Italy; Finland; Norway; Malta; Slovenia; Cyprus (Note: Only takes into account the Muslim population residing on land controlled by the Republic of Cyprus.); 1–2%: Croatia; Ireland; Ukraine; Andorra; < 1%: Iceland; Armenia; Belarus; Czech Republic; Estonia; Hungary; Latvia; Lithuania; Moldova; Monaco; Poland; Portugal; Romania; San Marino; Slovakia

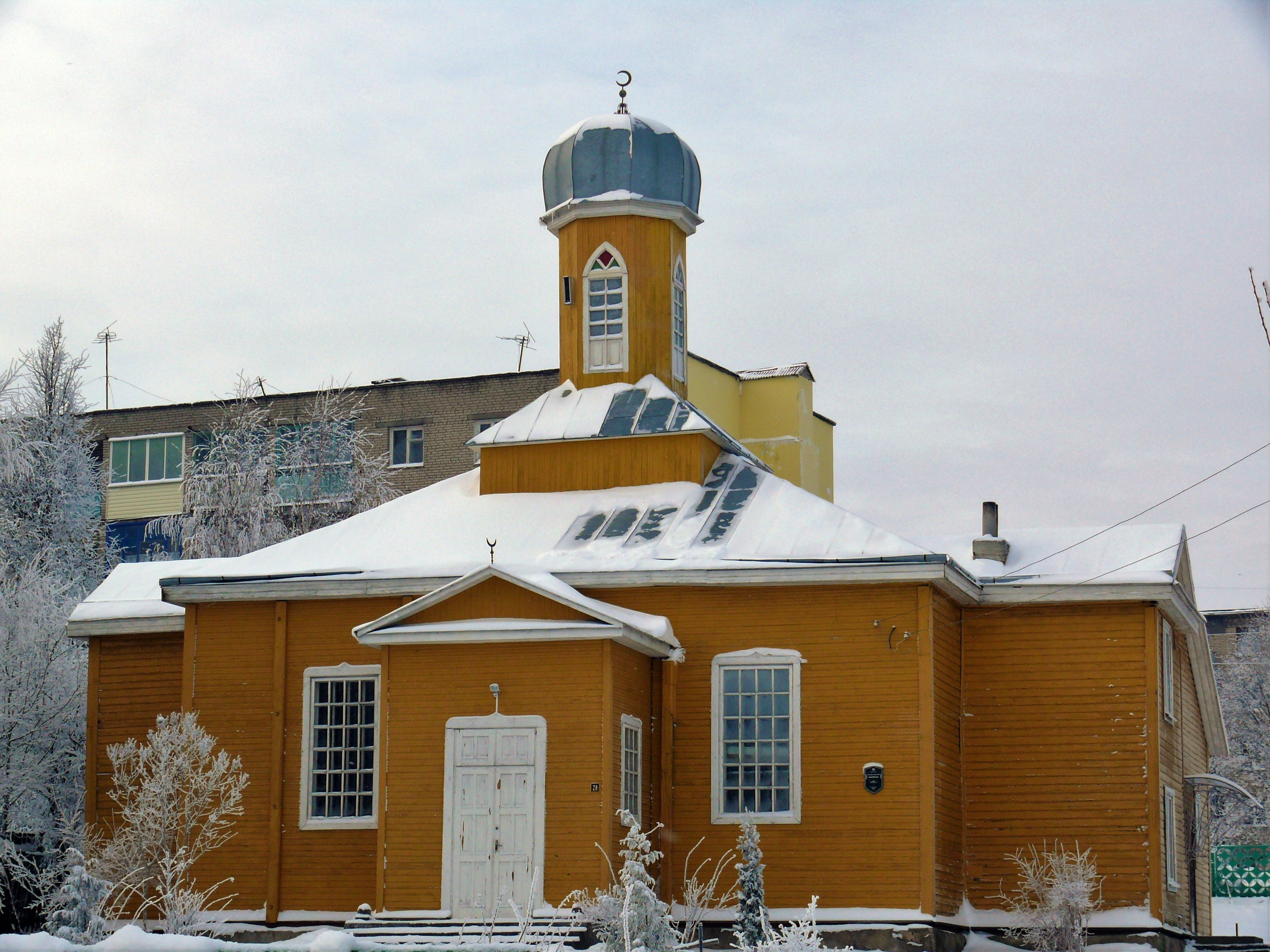
Mosque in Navahrudak.

A continuous presence of Islam in Belarus began in the 14th century. From this time it was primarily associated with the Lipka Tatars, many of whom settled in the Polish–Lithuanian Commonwealth while continuing their traditions and religious beliefs. The Lipka Tatars themselves did not call themselves that. They preferred to be called Belarusian Muslims, as they considered themselves more educated and religious than the nomadic Tatars. That is why the Turkic languages spoken by other Tatars did not take root among the Belarusian Tatars. The Belarusian Muslims spoke Old Belarusian, which was the state language in the Grand Duchy of Lithuania. But they wrote in Arabic letters. This is how the Arabic script of the Belarusian language appeared. In the 16th century, Circassians came here, in the 19th century (after the Russo-Turkish War) there were many captured Turks here.

With the advent of the Soviet Union, many Muslims left Belarus for other countries, particularly Poland. Presently, the Belarusian Muslim community consists of remaining Lipka Tatars, as well as recent immigrants from the Middle East. As of 2019, there were 8,445 Muslims in Belarus.

== History ==
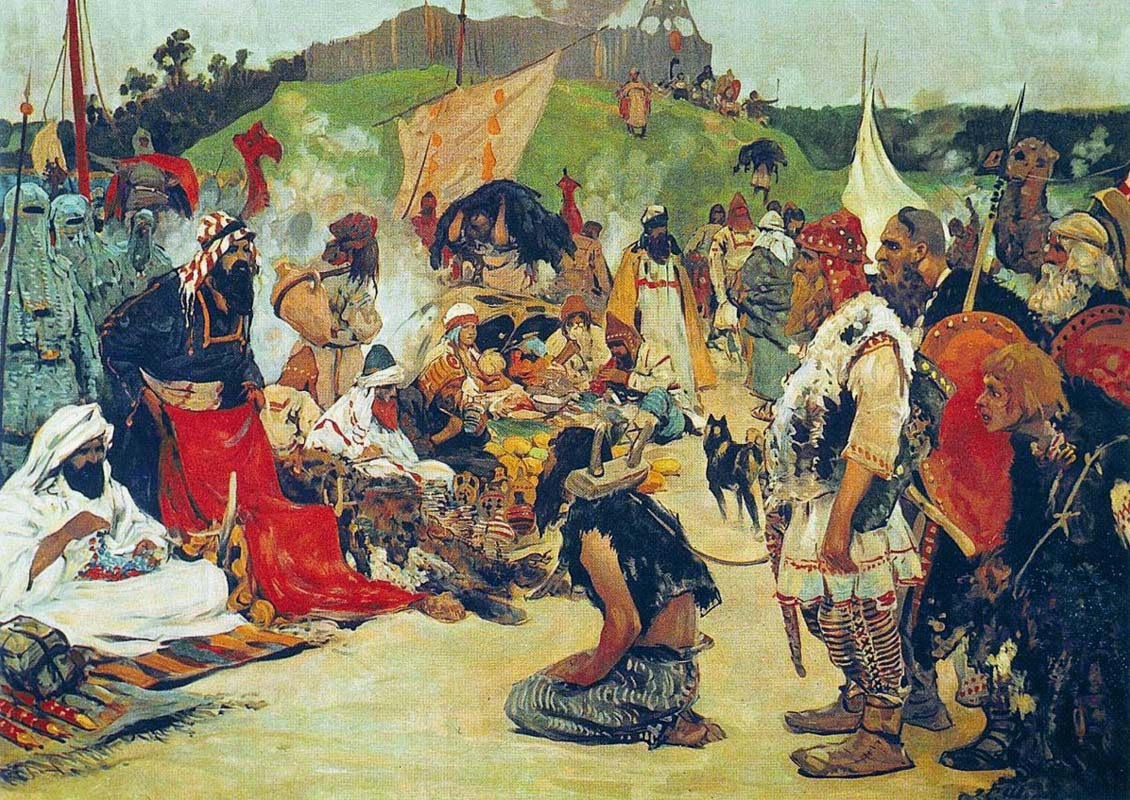
S. V. Ivanov. Trade negotiations in the country of Eastern Slavs. Pictures of Russian history. (1909)

=== Early period ===
The first evidence of contacts between Belarus and the Muslim world are silver coins (dirhams). The oldest of them date back to the 8th century. Researchers believe that the penetration of Arabic coins began in the 70-80s of the 7th century. The first stage of dirham circulation in Belarus lasted until about 833. A characteristic feature of this stage is the predominance of coins of the Umayyad and Abbasid dynasties of North African coinage. Dirhams of Asian coinage were rare at this time, but in subsequent periods they took a dominant position. Thus, in 1962, a treasure was found in the Glubokoe district with dirhams of Caliph Harun ar-Rashid. and al-Mutasim Billahi (the city of Fariz, 834). In 1960, in the village of Porechye in the Glubokoe district, a treasure was found, the oldest coin of which was minted in the name of the Caliph al-Mansur in the city of Madinat as-Salam.

The Arab authors Al-Balkhi, Al-Istakhri, Al-Hawqal, and other Muslim authors mention the country of Arthania, whose king lives in Artha. Some researchers tend to associate Arta with the Belarusian city of Orsha, and Artania — with Krivia.

The Tale of Bygone Years (12th century) contains a story about Vladimir's the Great choice of faith, which goes as follows. In 986, ambassadors from the Volga Bulgars arrived to Vladimir, offering him the opportunity to convert to Islam. When they told the prince about the rituals that must be observed, including the ban on drinking wine, Vladimir responded with the famous phrase: "Drinking is the joy of Rus'," after which he rejected the Bulgars' offer.

In Belarus, the Vikings actively sold local slaves, known as Sakaliba, to the Arab Caliphate. Usually, these are prisoners as a result of internecine wars between local princes or leaders: conditionally they sold their own to foreigners. Or — the story of "slavery for debt". Imagine that a person from some Podvinnia did not return a loan to a neighbor on time, and as a result ended up on the slave market in Baghdad.

Finally, a large part of trade with the Eastern countries was the trade in slaves captured as a result of wars and robber attacks. Baltic, Slavic and Finnish slaves, united by the Arabs under the single name "Saqaliba", acted as warriors and guards of the emirs, served as eunuchs in harems, where girls from those very regions were gathered. The scale of this shameful trade amounted to tens of thousands of people.

Belarusian national patterns were found on the ornaments of the Egyptian Mamluks. Some of the embroideries of medieval Islamic textiles in museum catalogs were attributed to the ends of men's belts or as part of a turban. An eight-pointed star-rosette of four double ears of wheat in Belarus was considered a symbol of fertility, the spirit of the harvest. It was believed that the god of prosperity, harvest, wealth — Sporysh — lived in a double ear. Linear-geometric ornament in embroidery played a significant protective role in the Slavic costume. A rhombus or a slanted square, a rhombus with extended sides, a rhombus with rays, a rhombus with hooks, a motif of an oblique cross, an eight-pointed star are found on wedding ponevas, on embroidered sleeves of women's shirts, on girls' headdresses. Researcher of Belarusian ornament M.S. Katsar assumes that the image in the form of a rhombus with a dot in the center is a symbol of the god Yarilo — the god of the vital forces of nature and harvest.

=== Islam in Grand Duchy of Lithuania ===
The history of Islam in Belarus began in the 14th century, as the Grand Duchy of Lithuania invited Tatars from the Golden Horde to assist with the protection of their borders.

==== The reign of Gediminas ====
The appearance of the first Tatars in Belarus falls on the reign of the Grand Duke of Lithuania Gediminas. History has preserved information that, having conquered the lands of Kievan Rus, Duke Gediminas moved further with his army, in the direction of the southwest, but unexpectedly encountered the nomadic tribes of the Tatars and Kipchaks. The Grand Duke came up with the following idea: to use the warlike nomads as defenders of the borders of the Belarusian-Lithuanian state. After all, the Tatars were considered excellent warriors — horsemen, it was not for nothing that they were said to be born and grow up in the saddle. Duke Gediminas invited the Tatars to serve in his army.

The Grand Dukes Algirdas and Keistut were no longer limited to using the Tatars only as border defenders, but also invited them to participate in their campaigns against the same knights-crusaders. Returning from service, the Tatars received the right to settle within the borders of the Grand Duchy of Lithuania, near cities and castles.

==== The reign of Vytautas ====
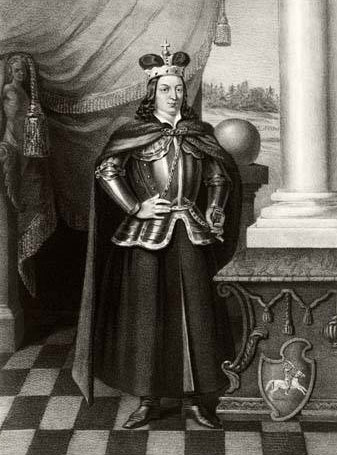
Grand Duke of Lithuania Vytautas the Great.

Vytautas the Great took a more active role in Tatar affairs. He expanded Tatar settlements across his realm, aiming to build a militarized social class. After his 1397 campaign against the Golden Horde, he brought thousands of prisoners to Lithuania. In 1398, returning from Crimea, he resettled several Karaite families — Jewish Khazars — in Trakai, who later spread to Vilnius and Panevėžys.

During the 1410 Battle of Grunwald, the sons of Khan Tokhtamysh—who once burned Moscow—fought alongside Vytautas against the Teutonic Knights. They were led by the famed Tatar commander Sultan Jalal ad-Din, whose cavalry dealt heavy losses to the crusaders. The last Grand Master of the Teutonic Order, Ulrich von Jungingen, was slain by Khan Bogardyn.

The largest Muslim community in Belarus was in Ivye. According to legend, it was founded by «Noble Batald» (probably Vitovt the Great).

The Ivye Tatars, offering their prayers to Allah, still call him "noble Batald". For help in the Battle of Grunwald, he gave the Muslims the Muravshchizna tract, which was located a little more than a kilometer from the Ivye castle. This is how the community was born. But the local Tatars got their own temple, a mosque, much later. Muslims also called Vytautas the «white khan» because the color white in the symbolism of the Turkic nomads meant the western direction. The prayer for Vytautas, which was read during Friday church services in mosques until the 20th century, remained in the tradition of the Belarusian Muslims.

Vytautas also received nickname «Vattad», the mainstay of Islam in the West, and they pronounced his name together with the names of the caliphs — the rulers of Islam.

=== Commonwealth period ===
Outwardly, the Tatars were not much different from the local population — fair-haired and light-eyed Europeans. They soon forgot their native language, but firmly preserved religious traditions. In fact, it was Islam with its clear regulation of all spheres of a believer's life that did not allow the Tatars to assimilate and preserved their ethnic identity. The Tatars were united by the laws of the Muslim community - the ummah, which was something like a "state within a state". There, the rules of mutual control and mutual assistance were strictly observed not only on religious, but also on everyday issues. The number of Tatars grew rapidly. In the 16th century, their number on Belarusian lands exceeded 20 thousand, 12 cathedral mosques were built. In the 17-18th centuries, the number of Muslims in the Polish-Lithuanian Commonwealth reached 60 thousand, and there were more than four hundred mosques.

==== Cultural herritage ====
The Muslim population was the first of other confessional groups to create an original alphabet based on Arabic script, adapted for recording the sounds of the Belarusian language, which in certain moments surpasses the two other Belarusian alphabets – Cyrillic and Latin – in terms of the accuracy of sound transmission, even in their modern form. Scientists can recreate the Belarusian speech of past centuries more accurately using Muslim texts than any other. Muslims have written thousands of books, primarily of religious, but not only, content – the so-called kitabs.

The Muslim culture of Belarus in the period before the 20th century demonstrates the largest (and uninterrupted for centuries) tradition of Belarusian-language religious literature compared to all other confessions. Only in recent decades has Catholic and Protestant literature exceeded in volume what Muslims had been creating for centuries.

In 1686, the Minsk Tafsir was published in Minsk, a manuscript of the Polish-Lithuanian Tatars from 1686, containing the text of the Quran with a translation into Polish. It is the first translation of the Quran into Polish and Slavic in general and the third into a European language. And the Belarusian language is one of the first living European languages into which the Quran was translated. At the same time, Christian Belarusians received the first full text of the Bible in its native language only in the second half of the 20th century.

The Muslim population, alone among the entire population of the region, continuously maintained the tradition of Belarusian-language book writing until the beginning of the 20th century. Only about Muslims can one say with certainty that they preserved, wrote and distributed books in the Belarusian language even in the darkest centuries for Belarusian culture.

The Tatars, however, soon settled in Lithuania, as well as in neighbouring Poland, and by the end of the 16th century, an estimated 100,000 Tatars lived in the Polish–Lithuanian Commonwealth, including the descendants of border guards, voluntary immigrants, and prisoners of war. From this group came the Lipka Tatars. In the early 19th century, several Tatars fled to the Ottoman Empire amidst rumours of forced baptisms of Muslims.

=== In Russian Empire ===
By the time Belarus became part of the Russian Empire, local Muslim communities were independent, but in 1831 they submitted to the Tauride Muslim Spiritual Administration. On the eve of World War I, more than a dozen generals from Belarusian Tatars served in the Russian army, and colonels, majors and lower-ranking officers numbered in the hundreds. All of them were graduates of Russian military educational institutions and were therefore considered the most loyal to the authorities. The Tatar-Mongol invasion separated Iran and the Caucasus from the Belarusian lands for a long time. But Iranian merchants and goods arrived at our fairs, and the Persian belts became the model for the famous Slutsk belts. Then the borders of the Russian Empire moved close to Iran. In addition to active trade with Persia, there were also wars.

During the Russo-Persian War of 1826-1828, the tsar's army was commanded by Ivan Paskevich, the owner of the Gomel estate. After that, Paskevich's palace in Gomel was decorated with many valuable things brought from Persia. An Iranian delegation was expected at the Gomel Regional Museum of Local History.

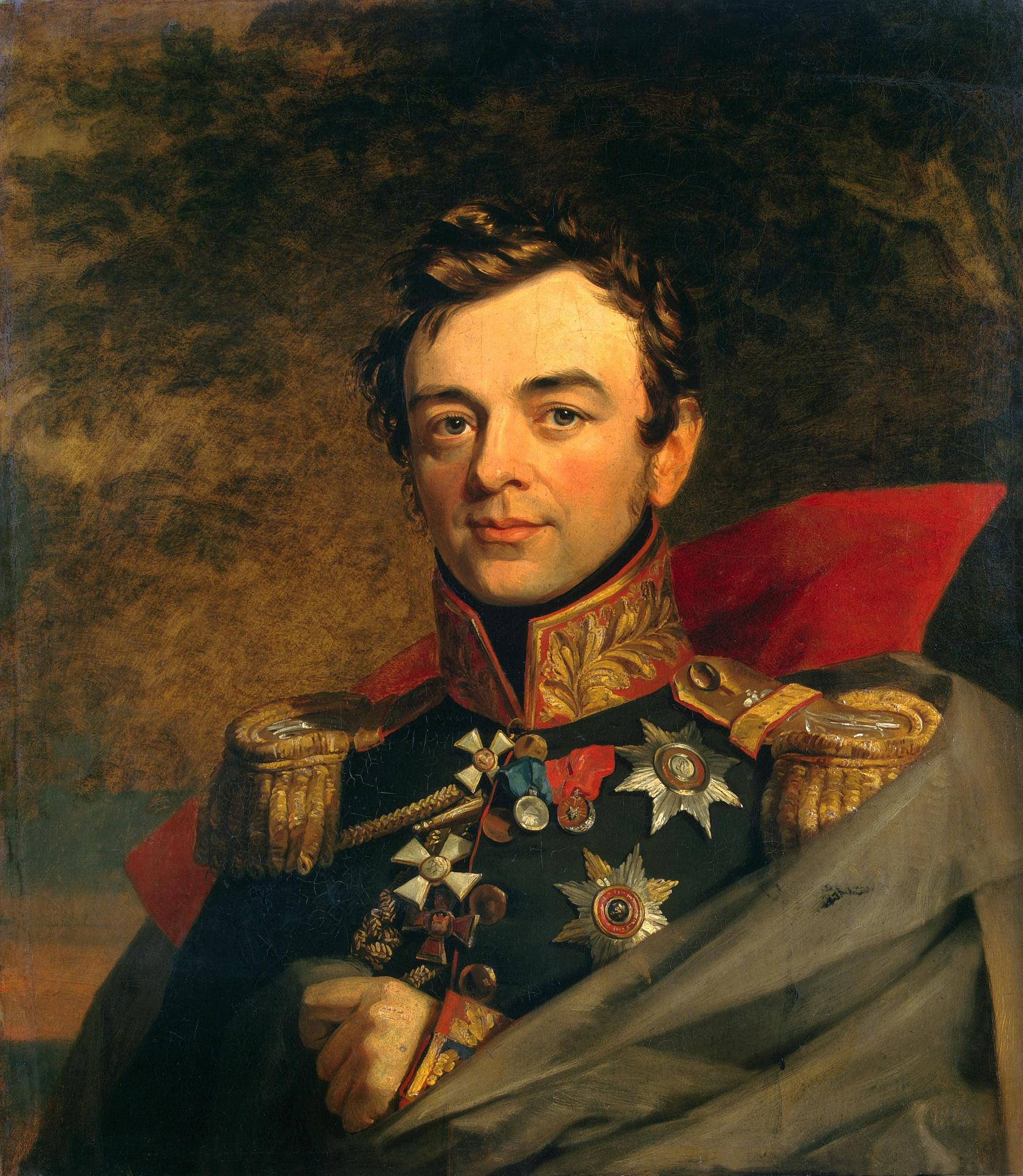
Ivan Paskevič

According to legend, Paskevich also brought a group of residents from Iran, whom he settled in Gomel. No direct data on this has yet been found, but this is known. From the former Persian subjects who swore allegiance to the Russian Tsar, on Paskevich's initiative, the Transcaucasian Muslim Cavalry Regiment was formed, consisting of six hundred men, led by "sultans". Azerbaijanis (who still make up a significant part of the population of Iran) and other peoples of Transcaucasia served in the regiment. The Muslim Cavalry Regiment fought bravely, but the hot temper of the horsemen was difficult to contain even with the drill of the Tsarist army. And in 1857, after a rebellion broke out, the regiment was disbanded. Perhaps some of his former horsemen could have been settled in the Gomel estate of the Paskeviches.

According to the data provided by the philologist A.F. Rogalev, by the end of the 19th century, the area of today's Krylov Street (then called Asia) was inhabited by Kurds. According to some assumptions, representatives of this ancient people, who are still fighting for their survival and independence in Turkey, Iraq and Iran, could have been brought from the Caucasus by the Paskeviches, who participated in colonial wars there. During the war with Iran in 1826-1828, Ivan Paskevich managed to win over the Kurdish troops led by Hassan-aga to his side. It is very likely that the Kurds could also have arrived here after the Russo-Turkish War of 1877-1878. So, perhaps, a leader from some Kurdish tribe settled on Asia (Krylov) Street, for example, from the Zaza Kurdish tribe living south of Lake Van, and his name was Zaza-beg, or Zaa-bek (Zaa is a diminutive of the Kurdish name Zaki), etc. Hence Zabeg. Be that as it may, even today some of the residents of this street are distinguished by their black hair, dark skin, and an unearthly gleam in their eyes.

Before the First World War, which broke out in the summer of 1914, the Russian government took steps to find out how many Muslims lived in various areas of the Russian Empire, including the Belarusian provinces. There was a discrepancy between the data provided by the police administration and the statistical department. It follows that the number of Muslims living in Belarusian settlements was constantly changing, or serious errors were made in collecting information

Kurds, in this area, lived several families of Assyrians. In the local school in the 20-30s of the 20th century there were even entire classes, in which teaching was conducted in Kurdish and Assyrian.

The oldest surviving mosque in the United States was opened in 1907 by Muslims from the Baltics and Belarus.

=== 20th century ===
==== Russian Civil War and interwar period ====
During the Russian Civil War and the Polish–Soviet War, Muslim leaders protected Jews from pogroms; the mullah of Uzda hid the local Jewish population in his cellar, and helped Jews flee westwards by disguising them as Muslims. In the Byelorussian Soviet Socialist Republic, Islam was a target of religious persecution; in 1935, closures of mosques began, the mullah of Uzda was deported to Siberia, and the mullah and muezzin of Smilavichy were executed.

==== World War II ====
During the Eastern Front of World War II, Nazi Germany sought to express itself as a protector of Islam, and there were attempts to win over the Belarusian Muslim community. In 1942, during the German occupation of Byelorussia, the Minsk Mosque, which had been closed in 1936 and used as a food bank, was reopened. The 1st Eastern Muslim SS Regiment also fought Belarusian partisans in Minsk Region until being merged into the SS-Sonderregiment Dirlewanger.

==== Post-World War II ====
From 1944 to 1946, many Lipka Tatar religious leaders, fearing renewed religious persecution, fled Belarus for Poland. This complicated the work of the Council for the Affairs of Religious Cults of the Soviet Union. The community of Iwye, in Grodno Region, became the largest recognised religious community in Belarus. In the 1950s, the Iwye Muslims continued celebrating Eid al-Adha and did not work on Fridays. After the dissolution of the Kletsk Islamic community in 1960, Iwye was the only remaining Islamic community in Belarus, though private practice of Islam continued.

During the Soviet militant atheism, this base uniting the Tatars was essentially destroyed. Thus, in 1962, the mosque in Minsk was destroyed, and a restaurant of the Yubileinaya Hotel was built in its place. In all of Belarus, only one functioning mosque remained in the village of Ivye in the Grodno region. In the 1970s, the Tatar cemetery in Minsk was destroyed, and the Tatar settlement was liquidated. Until that time, it was a complex of one-story wooden buildings along the streets: Dimitrova, Tatarskaya, Amuratorskaya. Tatar families were specially resettled in multi-story buildings that were new at that time. Moreover, they were resettled in different areas of Minsk, in different houses, so as to prevent their communication. As a result, the Minsk Tatars were almost completely assimilated. All the activists of the national and religious revival of the 1980s and 1990s came from provincial towns: Ivye, Kletska, Smilovich.

=== Since 1991 ===
In 1994, the First All-Belarusian Congress of Muslims was held. As a result, the Muslim Religious Community of the Republic of Belarus was founded. From its foundation until 2005, the Muslim Religious Community of the Republic of Belarus was headed by Ismail Alieksandrovič. Since 2005, it has been led by Abu-Biekir Šabanovič.

In 2007, the Ahmadiyya Muslims were banned from practising their faith openly, and given a similar status to other banned religious groups in the country. Unable to obtain state registration, Ahmadi Muslims in the country, who number about 30, including 13 native Belarusians, cannot conduct their activities formally as a group, such as importing or distributing literature, gathering together for prayers or meetings, and having an official representative.

Belarus is the only country in Europe to have jailed a newspaper editor for publishing the Danish cartoons of the Islamic prophet Muhammad. On 18 January 2008, Alexander Sdvizhkov was jailed for three years for 'incitement of religious hatred'.

== Present situation ==
Today, there are 7 mosques in Belarus: Smilavichy, Iwye, Slonim, and Navahrudak in the Grodno Region, Minsk and Kletsk in the Minsk Region, and Vidzy in the Vitebsk Region. From 1900 to 1902, a mosque was constructed in Minsk, but it was destroyed in 1962. On 11 November 2016, a replica of the mosque was opened in Minsk. There are 30 religious organisations officially registered, and 25 religious communities, of which 24 are Sunni and one is Shia. Most Belarusian Muslims are Sunni, of the Hanafi school.

Muslims have lived in Belarus since the 14th century, blending in well. However, in recent years preachers from other states have been changing the nature of Islam in Belarus by infusing radical ideas. Now and then there a group of individuals turns up among Belarusian Muslims who strive for a purer, as they would have it, type of Islam. It is no difficult task to find Belarusian Wahhabis on vk.com, a popular social network.

=== Salafism ===
Relations between the Christianity and Islam in Belarus are very tense, but there have been no direct clashes. Since the early 1990s, the Muslim community of Belarus has become an arena for the propaganda of various trends of Islam that are not traditional for Belarus. An analysis of modern Muslim literature widespread in Belarus allows us to conclude that some of the materials were sources with a radical orientation.

Preachers from Arab countries have appeared in Belarus. In particular, Wahhabis, who convince young people that they practice the “wrong Islam”: they read the Quran poorly, do not pray in accordance with religious canons, and make many mistakes. Thus, a group of radically minded, mostly young, Muslims appeared, which, although not numerous, caused increasing irritation among representatives of the older generation. The breakaway Muslims even wanted to create their own youth movement in Belarus. And then the state intervened in the relations within the Muslim community: the preachers were deported from Belarus, and the radically minded youth were “dispersed and calmed down”.

The largest information case of radicalization of Islam is connected with the report of the KGB of the Republic of Belarus in late 2014 about the detention of a group of Salafis, which "was formed under the influence of the religious-extremist organization "Hizb ut-Tahrir"." Among those detained were 8 foreign citizens and 12 Belarusians. Law enforcement agencies did not wait for the Muslims to commit specific offenses or crimes: foreigners were deported from the country, and "loyal preventive measures were applied to citizens of Belarus". According to the KGB, the Salafis were supposed to conduct illegal missionary activity in the territory of Minsk, Grodno and Mogilev regions. At the same time, a group of people representing any extremist religious organization was identified in Belarus for the first time. Previously, "individuals who, as a rule, were transiting through the territory of Belarus" were detained. However, journalists note that the KGB has a whole division dealing with the issue of radical Islamists, which “closes issues across the entire republic.” Religious scholars involved in the examination of new religious movements in our country expressed the opinion that “this is not the first and not the last case in Belarus".

Flag of Hizb ut-Tahrir

As reported by the Minister of Internal Affairs of Belarus I.A. Shunevich in 2016, the police knew of 10 militants of the “Islamic State” who have or had Belarusian citizenship. But the most well-known person is 33-year-old Denis Vasiliev, who died in battles on the Syrian-Iraqi border at the end of November 2015. The Kurdish resource writes that in 2014 he participated in the massacre of Kurdish Yazidis in Sinjar. A Belarusian Abu Sophia al-Belarusi headed the Malhama Tactical in Syria.

According to Siarhei Bohdan some Belarusians have links to terrorist organisations. For example, in 2005 the Spanish police arrested a Belarusian, Andrei Misyura, a chemical weapons expert for Al Qaeda, who studied chemistry at Belarusian State University.

Belarus has even suffered a terrorist attack which the police initially associated with radical Islam. In 2012, the police arrested a man in a mask with an inscription in Arabic who had attempted to blow up a police station in Zhlobin, a town in eastern Belarus. Law enforcement officials stated that the detainee had relations with a group involved in moving Afghan citizens to the countries of Western Europe. But the court found the detainee mentally ill and sent him for treatment instead of imposing a jail sentence.

Probably the most famous Belarusian Muslim today is Daniil Lyashuk, nicknamed Mujahid, a former fighter of the Tornado unit that fought in Donbass against the Novorossiya militia. In September 2015, Mujahid was detained by Ukrainian law enforcement agencies on suspicion of committing torture and homosexual rape of residents of the Luhansk region. According to the chief military prosecutor of Ukraine, Anatoly Matios, Lyashuk “professes the values of the extremist organization Islamic State”.

In May 2016, 24-year-old Ivan Sopov (known in virtual space as Genrikh Litvin), the administrator of the groups “Historical and Political Disputes” and “Baltic-Black Sea Union” on the social network VK, was detained in Moscow. Sopov was born in the Smolensk region and until recently positioned himself as a Belarusian nationalist. According to preliminary data, several months before this, Sopov converted to Islam, grew a Wahhabi beard and began to hatch a plan to travel to Syria to participate in military operations on the side of the "Islamic State".

Eduard (Rasul) Muravitsky, a member of the Belarusian national mixed martial arts team who converted to Islam, said in one of his interviews:

I have noticed that more and more ethnic Belarusians are converting to Islam. Of course, everyone has their own motives, but it seems to me that there is one common factor: people need support, unity. And Islam provides this. Here is an example: a regular "mugging" on the street - someone "hooked" a Belarusian. And what will passers-by do? Let's not deceive ourselves - most will pretend that nothing happened and speed up their pace. But try to hook a Muslim if his brothers in faith are nearby - people will immediately come running and fight back!

=== Sufism ===
Town Lowchytsy was historically particularly an important site for Sufism in Belarus. The tomb of wali Eŭlii Kontus, a shepherd who possessed the power to heal the sick and crippled, as well as travel to Mecca in an instant, was an important site for Sufis in the Polish–Lithuanian Commonwealth and Russian Empire.

The Muslim cemetery (mizar) in Lowchytsy is also one of the oldest in Belarus. This place is a Belarusian Mecca for Muslims. Famous Belarusian Muslim figures are buried in the cemetery: generals Yusuf Belyak, Matvey Tugan-Baranovsky, Alexander Poltarzhitsky, numerous participants in the uprisings of 1794, 1830-1831, 1863. The cemetery contains the grave of Saint Eŭlii Kontus, who was credited with the miraculous power of healing the sick and crippled - it is surrounded by stones, kept clean, and well-groomed.

According to a legend, Saint Kontus, a shepherd from the Tatar village of Lowchytsynear Navahrudak. Mystically, he was transported to Mecca every day to pray, and returned in the blink of an eye. One day, the village's owner, the landowner Lovchitsy, set out on Hajj, but spent all his money on the journey to Mecca and was unable to return. A shepherd saved him, instantly transporting him home to Lowchytsy. The shepherd soon died, and news of his holiness spread throughout Belarus. Kontus's grave remains in the Lowchytsy cemetery. Lithuanian Tatars have long revered it as miraculous and make pilgrimages to it.

Pilgrimages to Lovchitsy had already become quite widespread by the mid-19th century. The cult of the Saint Kontus reached its peak at the beginning of the 20th century. After World War I, the name's popularity waned somewhat, and by the second half of the 20th century, it had completely disappeared. Pilgrimages continue to this day. Not only residents of Belarus come to Lowchytsy, but also some Lipka Tatars who emigrated to Poland after the war. They take with them leaves, stones, and other small relics found near the saint's grave.

Today, Lipka Tatars, and especially their clergy, are somewhat ashamed of the cult of the Kontus grave and always emphasize that they worship only Allah.

If someone took soil from the grave and brought it home, they didn't know what they were doing. This is not in Islam, and it won't bring any benefit. People came, but it's absolutely not comparable to Mecca... This is one of the oldest mosques in Belarus—an important place for Muslims, but it's not a place of pilgrimage, — Navahrudak imam Ya. I. Aleksandrovich

Certain elements of Sufism penetrated Belarus (the cult of the saint Kontus, the ziker prayer, individual Sufi texts in manuscripts, etc.), but Sufism as a distinct, independent movement did not take root there. The reasons for this are quite obvious. Eastern "folk Sufism" was largely a manifestation of grassroots initiative, a form of protest against normative Islam, which was controlled by governments and major Islamic scientific and educational centers.

=== Shia Islam ===
In Belarus exist a Muslim Shiite Community Ahl Al-Bayt Belarus, who follow the path of the immaculate Prophetic lineage - Ahl Al-Bayt.

== List of Belarusian mosques ==
- Vidzau Mosque
- Dawbut Mosque
- Ivye Mosque
- Kletskaya Mosque
- Lowchytsky Mosque
- Lyakhavichy Mosque
- Minsk Mosque
- Navahrudak Mosque
- Nekrashun Mosque
- Minsk Cathedral Mosque
- Slonim Mosque
- Slonim Mosque (1994)
- Smilavichy Mosque

== Notable Belarusian Muslims ==
=== Politicians ===
- Haji Hasroṹ — Persian diplomat of Belarusian origin, translator at the court of Shah Abbas, one of the most respected merchants during his reign.
- Ismail Alieksandrovič — Belarusian mufti who was leader of the Muslim Religious Community of the Republic of Belarus from its founding in 1994 until 2005.
- Ibrahim Kanapacki — Belarusian socio-political, cultural and religious figure, historian, one of the leaders of the Tatar diaspora in Belarus.
- Jakub Szynkiewicz — First mufti of the newly independent Poland in 1925.

=== Soldiers ===
- Maciej Sulkiewicz — Belarusian-born Russian, Crimean, and Azerbaijani military commander and politician
- Hasan Konopacki — Belarusian soldier, activist of the national liberation movement.
- Daniił Laszuk — Ukrainian military man, participant in the Russo-Ukrainian war.
- Abu Salman al-Belarusi — Malhama Tactical leader.

=== Athletes ===
- Vladislav Mukhamedov — Belarusian former professional footballer.
- Leila Rajabi — Belarusian and Iranian track and field athlete, shot putter, medalist of the Asian Championships and Asian Games.

== Gallery ==
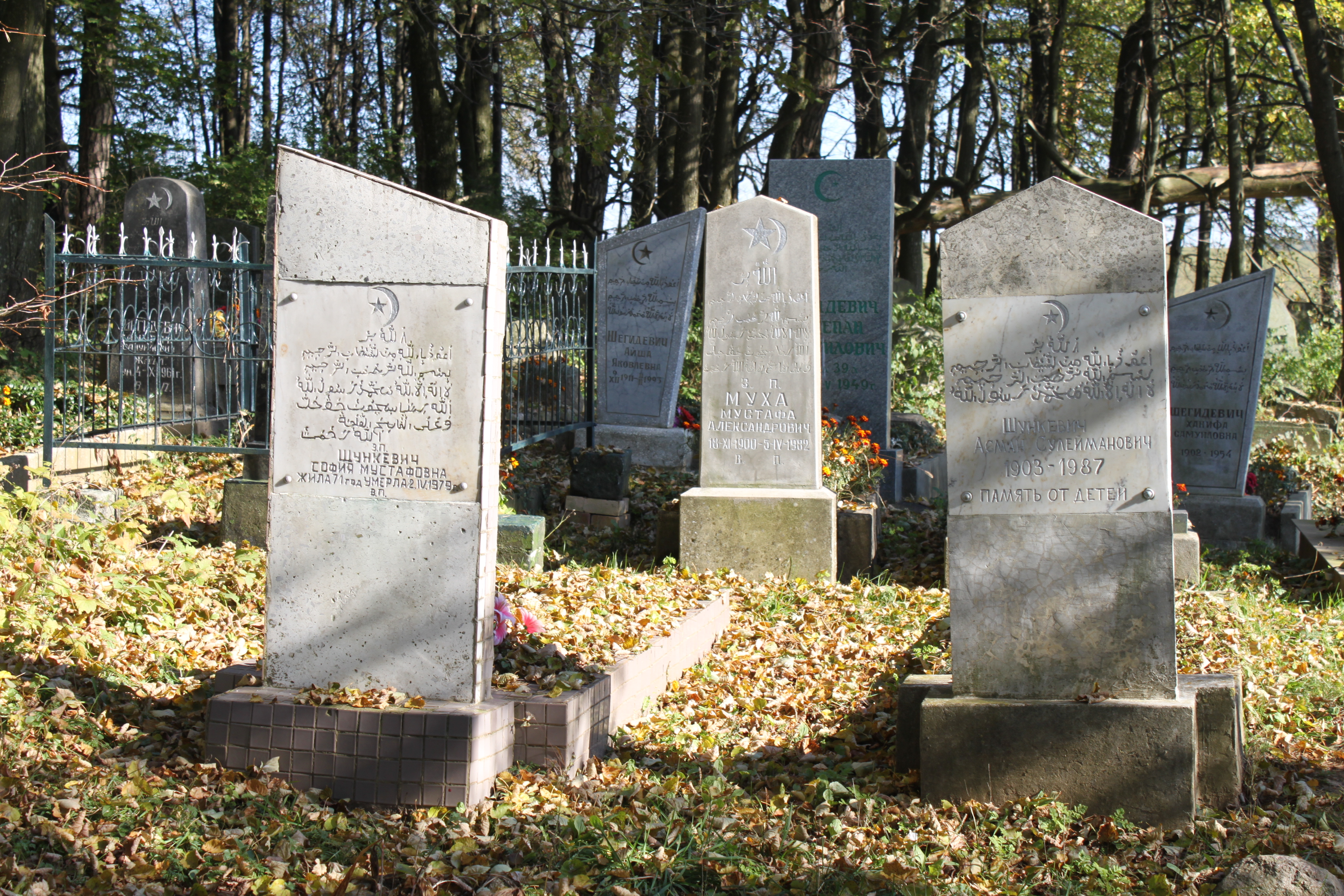
Tatar cemetery in Belarus.

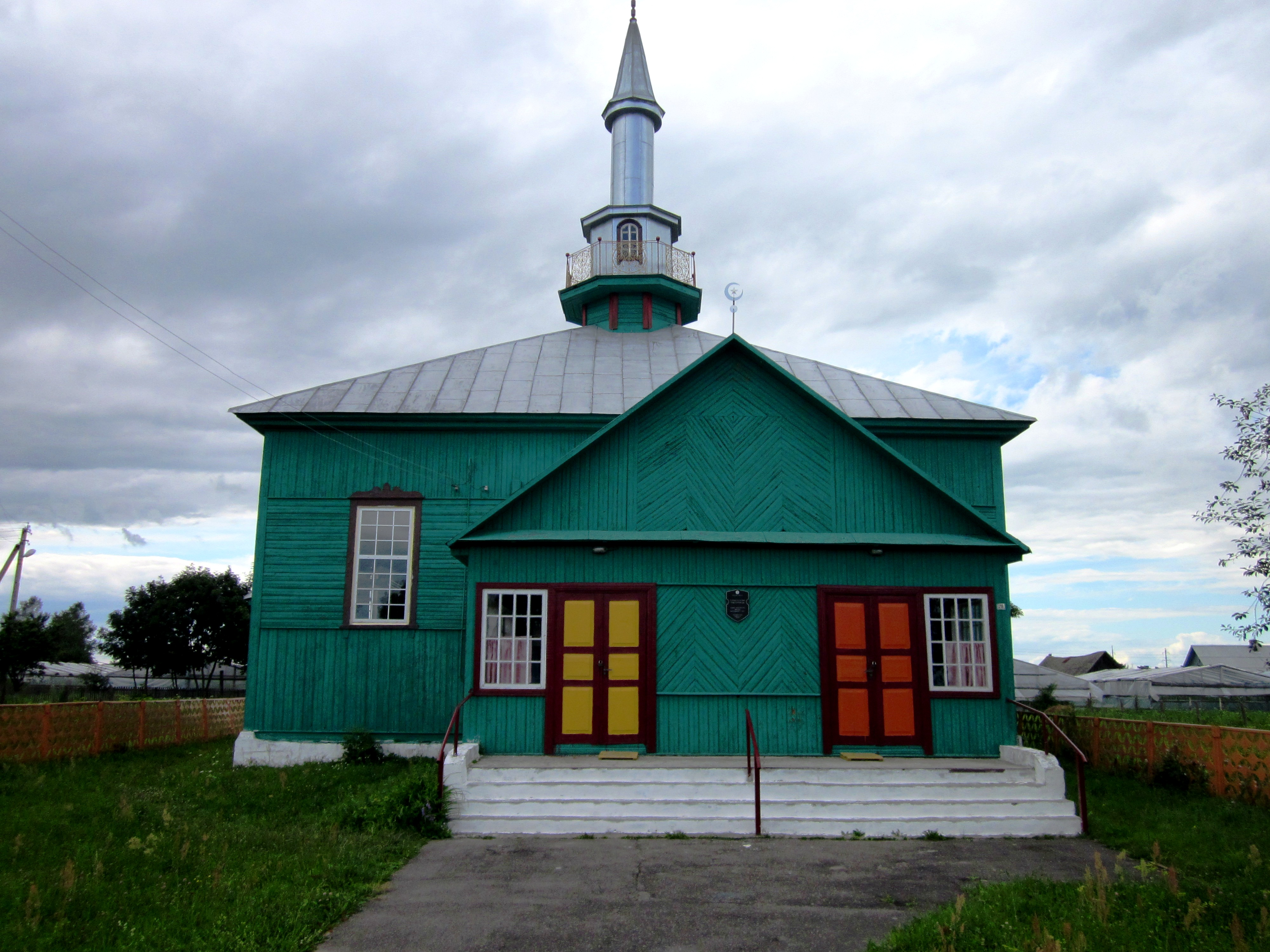
Mosque in Iwye

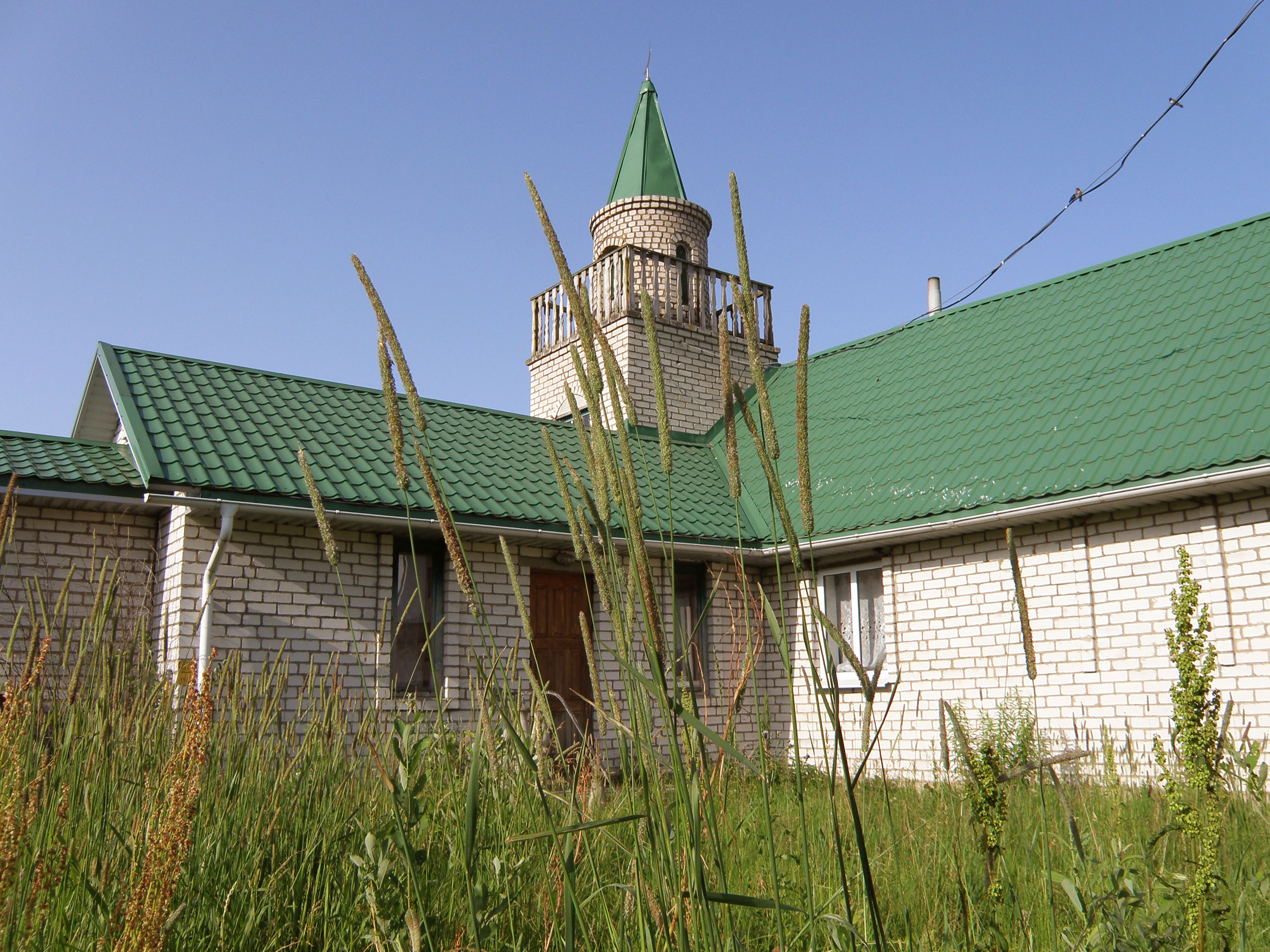
Mosque in Smilavichy

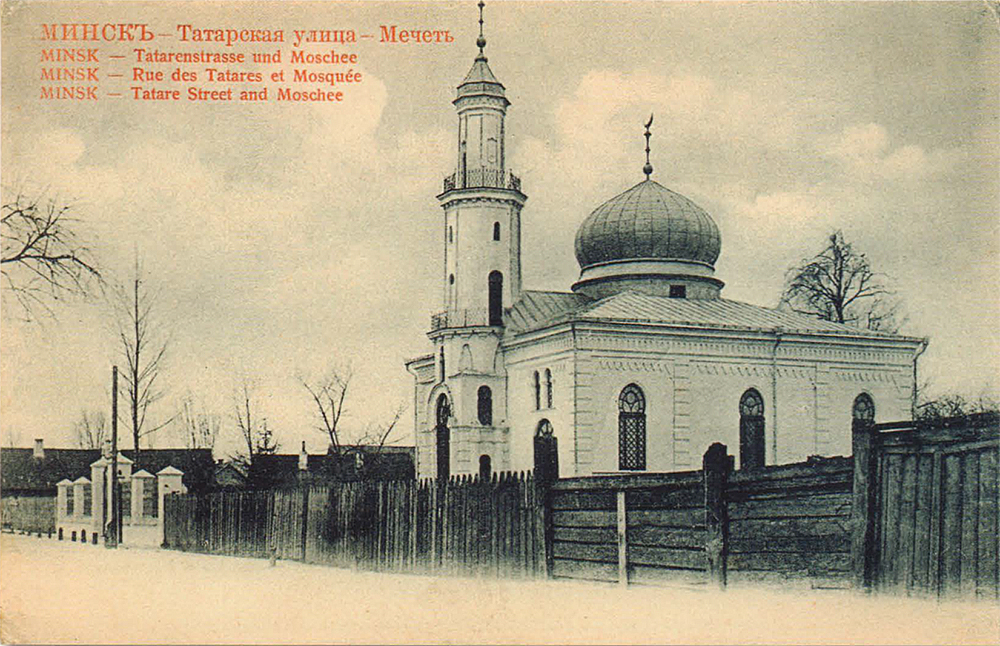
Mosque in Minsk (destroyed in 1962)

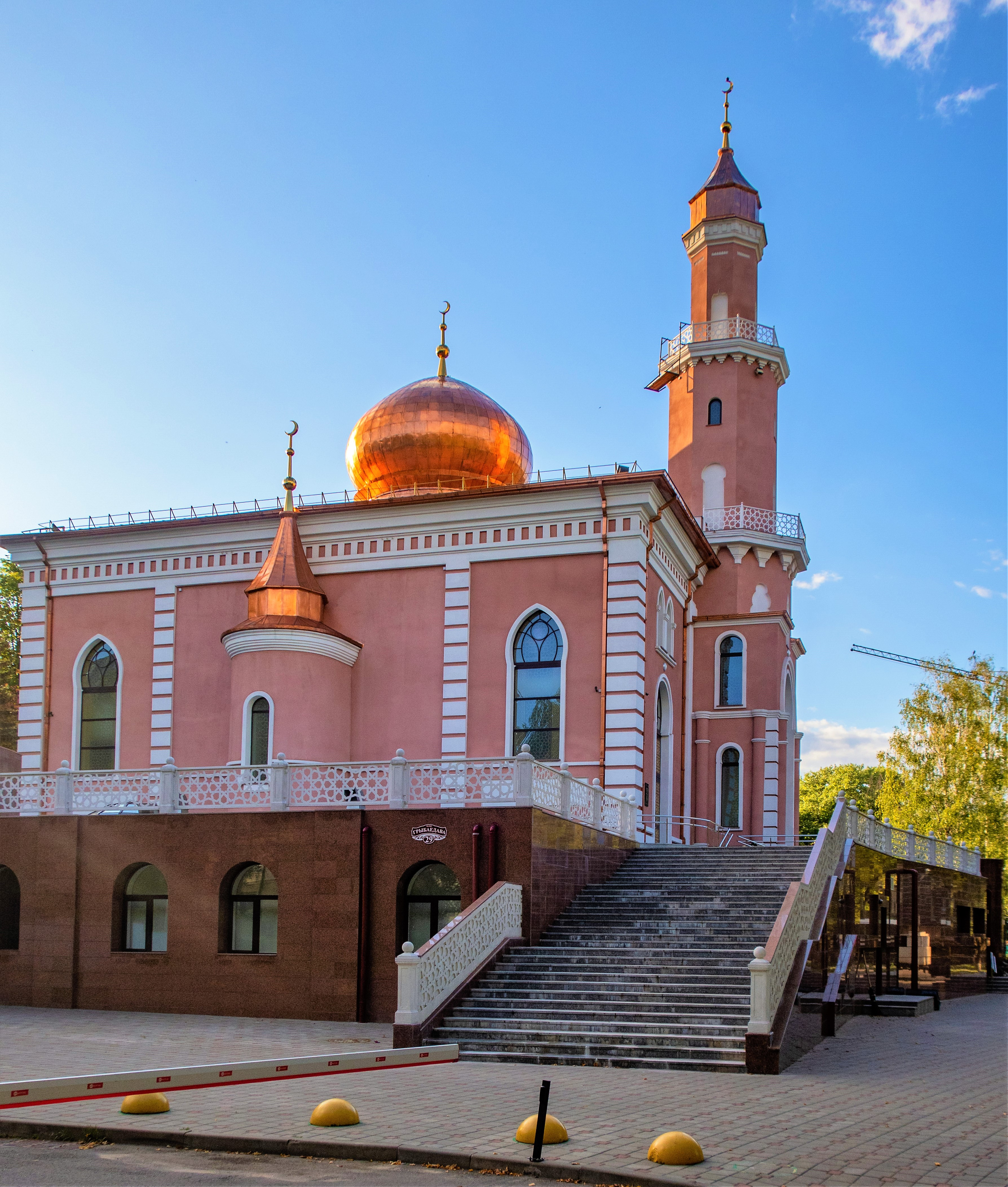
Mosque in Minsk (built in 2016)

== See also ==
- Belarusian Arabic alphabet
  - Kitābs — books written in Belarusian using Arabic script.
  - Tafsirs — books in Belarusian Arabic that contained the text of the Quran with a translation and some elements of commentary.
  - Minsk Tafsir — a manuscript of Belarusian Tatars from 1686, containing the text of the Quran with a translation into Polish.
  - Hamaylis — Belarusian small-format books that contain prayers in Arabic and Turkic languages, individual surahs (verses) of the Quran, explanations of religious rituals, as well as advice on treating diseases, interpretations of dreams[ru], and calendars of lucky and unlucky days. Usually, Arabic and Turkic texts are accompanied by explanations in Belarusian or Polish.
- Petyhorcy
- Religion in Belarus
- Freedom of religion in Belarus
