= Djawi =

Djawi may refer to:

- Jawi people, an Aboriginal Australian people of the Kimberly Coast
- Jawi dialect, a Bardi language dialect historical spoken by the Jawi people

== See also ==
- Jawi (disambiguation)
- Djawi-Hisworo, an early-20th-century Javanese newspaper
- Jawoyn or Djawin, an Aboriginal Australian people of the Northern Territory
