= Ibrahim Kanapacki =

Belarusian Lipka Tatar community leader

- Ібрагім Канапацкі
- Born: 28 February 1949; Smilavichy, Byelorussian SSR, Soviet Union (now Belarus)
- Died: 9 September 2005 (aged 56); Minsk, Belarus
- Years active: 1990–2005
- Known for: Lipka Tatar activism

Ibrahim Barysavič Kanapacki (Belarusian: Ібрагім Барысавіч Канапацкі; Tatar: Ибраһим Борис улы Канапацкий, Ibrahim Boris uly Kanapatsky; 28 February 1949 – 9 September 2005) was a Belarusian Lipka Tatar religious, political, and cultural leader.

== Early life and career ==
Ibrahim Kanapacki was born to Barys Ibrahimavič Kanapacki and Safji Mustafaŭna in Smilavichy, in what was then the Byelorussian Soviet Socialist Republic of the Soviet Union. He was descended from a family of Lipka Tatar szlachta. His grandfather, Ibrahim Chasinievič Kanapacki, served as imam of Smilavichy. In addition to Ibrahim, the Kanapacki family had 3 other children: daughters Razalija and Tanzilia and son Mustafa.

In 1966, Kanapacki entered the historical faculty of the Maxim Gorky Minsk State Pedagogical Institute (now the Maksim Tank Belarusian State Pedagogical University). He later worked at the Kamienaborsk school in the Byerazino District, in the Minsk Region. In 1972, Kanapacki became a member of the Communist Party of the Soviet Union. In 1975, Kanapacki married Hanna Kochna. In 1976 they had a son, named Zachar, and in 1978, they had a daughter, named Zaryna.

== Lipka Tatar leadership ==
In 1990, Kanapacki helped to found the Al-Kitab Belarusian Association of Muslim Tatars (known since 2000 as the Zikr ul-Kitab Belarusian Public Association of Tatars). The first conference of Zikr ul-Kitab, dedicated to the 600th anniversary of the Lipka Tatars in Belarus, was held on 26 and 27 March 1993. In January 1994, he was a member of the organising committee of the First All-Belarusian Association of Muslims. In this period Kanapacki also became deputy mufti and Chairman of the Muslim Association of Minsk, as well as serving as head of the Smilavichy Mosque.

From 1999, Kanapacki served as editor-in-chief of the Belarusian-language Bayram and Al-Islam magazines, in addition to the Life and Tatar Life newspapers. From 1996, the Muslim Tatar Calendar of Belarus was also published under his editorship. He assisted in the 1993 republishing of Anton Mukhlinsky's 1857 book 'Study of the Origin and Status of Lithuanian Tatars'. In 1997, he was one of the authors of the Manuscripts and Printed Books of Belarusian Tatars catalogue.

From his position within the Muslim community, he worked to restore mosques throughout Belarus, including Slonim, Smilavichy, Navahrudak, Vidzy, Kletsk, Maladzyechna, Lowchytsy, and the Minsk Cathedral Mosque. In 1995, he assisted with the creation of a Lipka Tatar cultural centre in Iwye.

As one of the leaders of the Belarusian Islamic community, Kanapacki promoted religious harmony, and made himself known as an active supporter of the Belarusian national and cultural revival, speaking the Belarusian language in everyday life.

== International activities ==
In 1999, as part of a delegation of Lipka Tatars, Kanapacki met with President of Northern Cyprus Rauf Denktaş. In April 2000, he met with representatives of the United States Congress Commission for the Development of Programmes for the Activities of National Minorities. As International Ambassador of Peace, he visited Libya in 1999, Chad in 2000, Iraq in 2001, and Jerusalem in 2004. In 1993, he was a delegate to the First Congress of the Fatherland Global Association of Belarusians, and was invited to all subsequent congresses as a guest.

== Death ==
Kanapacki died on 9 September 2005. After his death, several Belarusian newspapers, including Nasha Niva, paid tribute to him. In 2014, a plaque at his family home in Smilavichy home was placed commemorating him.
