= Mohammad Misbach =

Indonesian politician

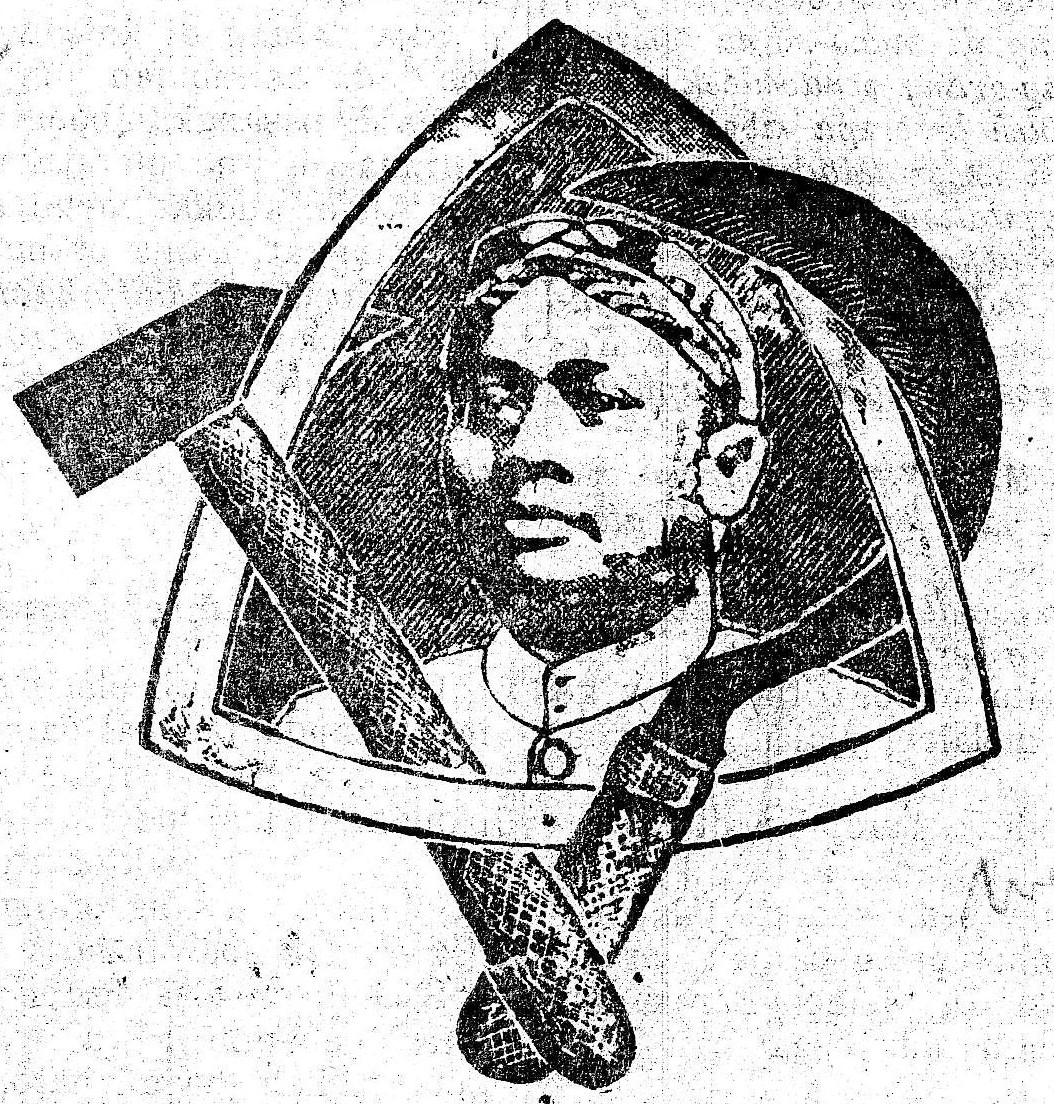
Hadji M. Misbach portrait from Medan Moeslimin 1 January 1925 cover

Mohammad Misbach (c. 1876–1926), commonly known as Haji Misbach, was a communist and Islamic activist from Surakarta, Dutch East Indies. He was a leading member of the left wing of the Sarekat Islam organization in the 1910s and famously advocated for the compatibility of Islam and communism.

== Biography ==
Misbach was born Achmad in Kauman, Surakarta, Dutch East Indies in around 1876. He was the son of a wealthy Batik trader and received a traditional Islamic education in a Pesantren, as well as a brief eight-month period in a government school. He entered the Batik trade and became fairly wealthy, owning his own workshop. When he got married he changed his name to Darmodiprono; however, after making the Hajj he changed his name once again to Hadji Mohammad Misbach.

When the Sarekat Islam was founded in Surakarta in 1912, he joined, although he was initially not prominent. Misbach started to become well known among the reformist generation in Surakarta (called kaum muda or young group); he became more active in 1914 when he joined Marco Kartodikromo's League of Native Journalists (Dutch: Inlandsche Journalisten Bond). In 1915 he became even better known after he acted as leader of local people in Surakarta who were opposed to the Dutch "anti-plague" policies which involved the partial demolition of native homes. He refused to have alterations made to his own house until he was ordered to by a magistrate.

In 1915 Misbach helped cofound a left-wing Islamic monthly magazine named Medan Moeslimin (Muslim forum) as a response to increasing Christian missionary publications in Java.

In 1917 he launched a new daily newspaper called Islam Bergerak (Islam in Motion). He also opened a hotel, the Hotel Islam, along with a bookstore and religious school. During this time he was a close ally of Muhammadiyah, its founder Ahmad Dahlan and his protege Hadji Fachrodin. He also continued to be active in campaigning against the Dutch "anti-plague" policies; in 1918 the Insulinde party appointed him as local investigator of the matter and allowed him to found new local branches outside Surakarta to expand the campaign.

In 1918, Misbach and some of his more Islamically-minded allies (including Oemar Said Tjokroaminoto) entered into a dispute with some parts of the nationalist movement over the publications of content in the Surakarta newspaper Djawi-Hisworo which they deemed disrespectful to Muhammad. They founded a counter-organization named Sidik Amanat Tableg Vatonah (TKNM, "To confirm, convey, and propagate goodness"). They held immense protest rallies, some of which had twenty thousand people in attendance. The main activity of the group was to send letters of complaint to the colonial government; it eventually fell apart over disputes about fundraising.

After that he began to campaign in the countryside, moving beyond local influence in Surakarta for the first time. He became a propagandist in the countryside against the regressive Corvée forced labour system through which peasants had to do unpaid work or risk being expelled from their land.

He was released from prison in August 1922.

With the 1923 split of the Sarekat Islam into left and right wings, he followed most of the left wing into the PKI (Indonesian Communist Party). After a bombing in Surakarta, Haji Misbach was blamed and exiled to New Guinea.
