= Filipino Aljamiado =

Repetition and reinterpretation of classical Aljamiado

Filipino Aljamiado, is the repetition and reinterpretation of classical Aljamiado which is conventionally defined as the use of Arabic script for transcribing European languages like old Spanish and it's use in literature, communications, and art, the Aljamiado then otherwise known as the Morisco alphabet, except now reapplied to the Philippines' setting where the locally adapted Arabic script, Jawi, is now used to transcribe Modern Spanish after it itself, reverse-engineered Arabic after the Christian Reconquest of Muslim Spain, known as the Reconquista. According to Isaac Donoso it attests to the Philippines as a dynamic cultural crossroads between the cross and crescent, as the Christian Spain that encountered Islam, came to be entangled with the Muslim Philippines which also encountered with the said Christian Empire as well.

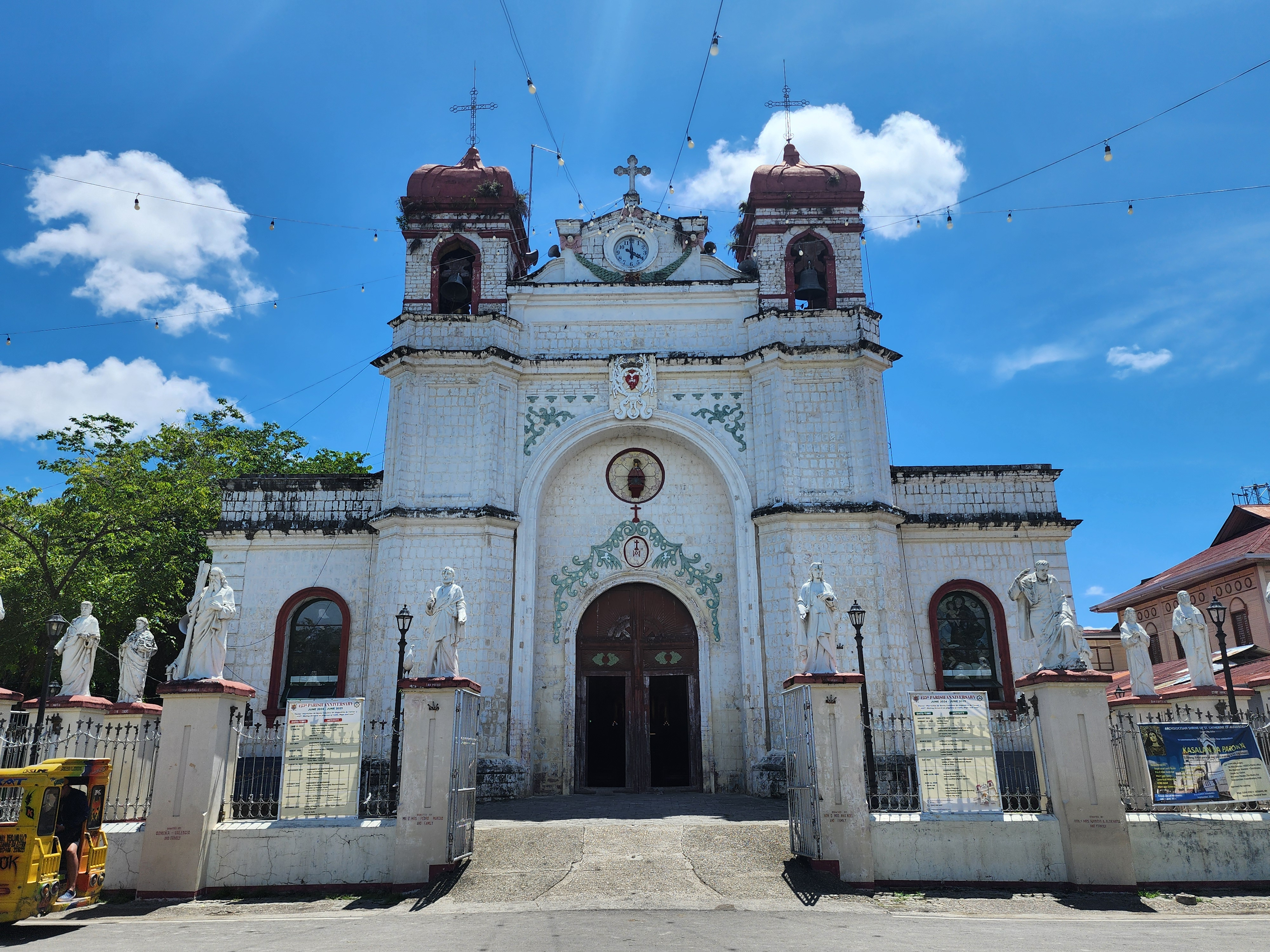
The Carcar church in Cebu City, it employs Aljamiado stylism by incorporating both native Filipino Muslim Moro architecture AKA Philippine Mudejar art and Spanish Christian Baroque.

A document from the Sulu Sultanate using Filipino Aljamiado - Jawi script used to transcribe Spanish words common in Chavacano. Photo taken by writer, Isaac Donoso.

And specifically, from the seventeenth to the nineteenth centuries, the Moro peoples of the Philippines increasingly utilized the Arabic-derived script known as Philippine Jawi to transcribe the Spanish language. Representing a sociolinguistic phenomenon that transcended mere code-switching, this practice is well-documented within the holdings of the National Archives of the Philippines, most notably in diplomatic protocols concerning the Tausug and Maguindanao sultanates. The proliferation of Spanish-language Jawi texts was largely propelled by Zamboanga’s emergence as a prominent cultural nexus in the southern archipelago, alongside Manila’s growing political gravity in drawing the political patronage of the sultanates. Furthermore, the script was systematically adapted for pedagogical use in language primers through the pioneering initiatives of the Jesuit missionary Jacinto Juanmarti, who laid the foundations of Moro philology. The script and language is an important monument to the literature produced when Islam and Christianity that once encountered each other in Spain, once again re-encountered each other in the Philippines.
