= Aljamiado =

Writing with the Arabic or Hebrew script for European languages

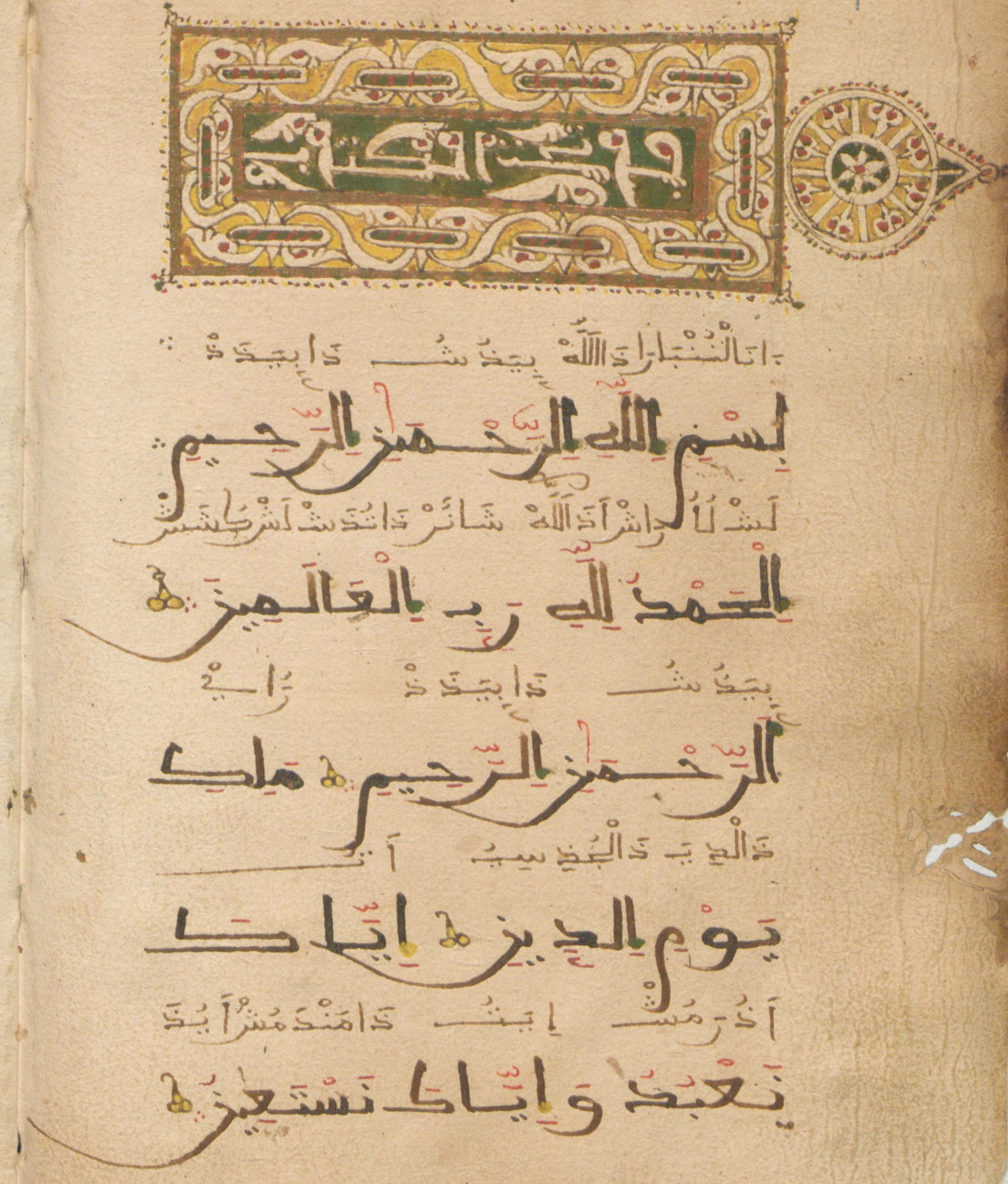
Al-Fatiha with Castilian translations in Aljamiado script above each line of Arabic Quranic text.

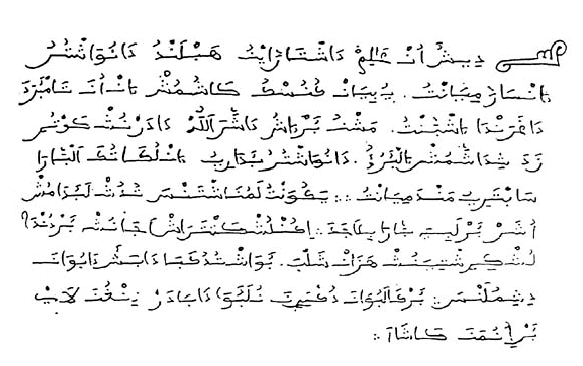
Aljamiado text by Mancebo de Arévalo. c. 16th century. (Note: The passage is an invitation directed to the Spanish Moriscos or Crypto-Muslims so that they continue fulfilling the Islamic prescriptions in spite of the legal prohibitions and so that they disguise and they are protected showing public adhesion the Christian faith.)

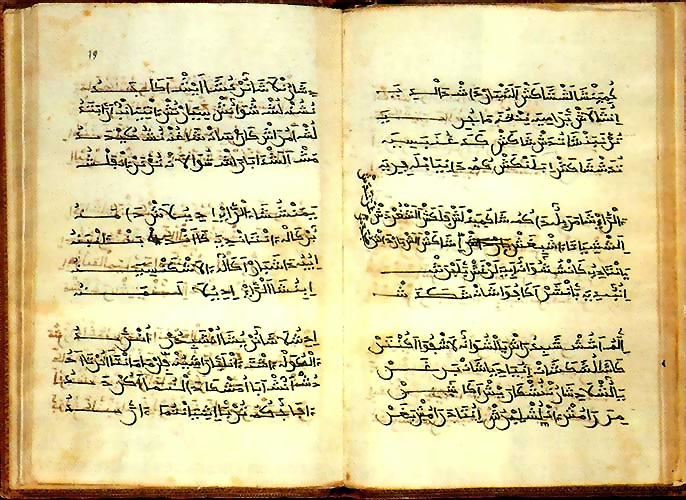
Poema de Yuçuf

Aljamiado (Spanish: [alxaˈmjaðo]; Portuguese: [alʒɐmiˈaðu]) (Note: Arabic: عَجَمِيَّة, romanized: ʿaǧamiyyah [ʕæd͡ʒæˈmij.jæ]) or Aljamía texts are manuscripts that use the Arabic script for transcribing European languages, especially Romance languages such as Old Spanish or Aragonese. This alphabet is also called the Morisco alphabet.

According to Anwar G. Chejne, Aljamiado or Aljamía is "a corruption of the Arabic word ʿaǧamiyyah (in this case it means foreign language) and, generally, the Arabic expression ʿaǧam and its derivative ʿaǧamiyyah are applicable to peoples whose ancestry is not of Arabian origin". During the Arab conquest of Persia, the term became a pejorative.

== History ==
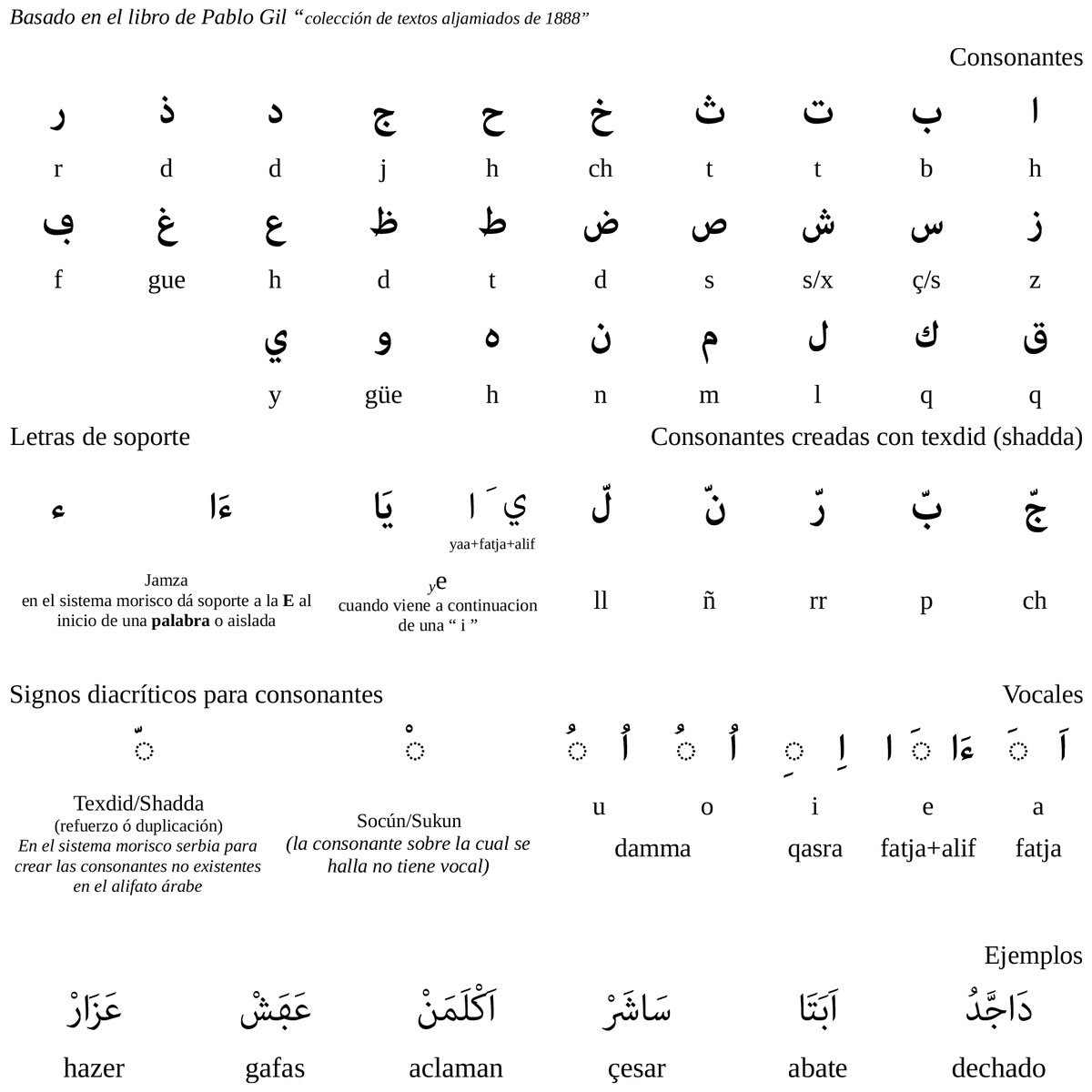
Aljamiado letters

The systematic writing of Romance-language texts in Arabic scripts appears to have begun in the fifteenth century, and the overwhelming majority of such texts that can be dated belong to the sixteenth century. A key aljamiado text is the compilation Suma de los principales mandamientos y devediamentos de nuestra santa ley y sunna by the muftī of Segovia, of 1462.

In later times, Moriscos were banned from using Arabic as a religious language, and wrote in Spanish on Islamic subjects. Examples are the Coplas del alhichante de Puey Monzón, narrating a Ḥaǧǧ, or the Poema de Yuçuf on the Biblical Joseph (written in Aragonese).

Aljamiado played a very important role in preserving Islam and the Arabic language in the life of the Moriscos of Castile and Aragon; Valencian and Granadan Moriscos spoke and wrote in Andalusi Arabic. After the fall of the last Muslim kingdom on the Iberian peninsula, the Moriscos (Muslims in parts of what was once Al-ʾAndalus) were forced to convert to Christianity or leave the peninsula. They were forced to adopt Christian customs and traditions and to attend church services on Sundays. Nevertheless, some of the Moriscos kept their Islamic belief and traditions secretly, and this included the usage of Aljamiado.

In 1567, Philip II of Spain issued a royal decree in Spain, which forced Moriscos to abandon using Arabic on all occasions, formal and informal, speaking and writing. Using Arabic in any sense of the word would be regarded as a crime. They were given three years to learn the language of the Christian Spanish, after which they would have to get rid of all Arabic written material. Moriscos of Castile and Aragon translated all prayers and the (ʾAḥādīṯ of the Prophet Muhammad) into Aljamiado transcriptions of the Spanish language, while keeping all Qurʾānic verses in the original Arabic. Aljamiado scrolls were circulated amongst the Moriscos. Historians came to know about Aljamiado literature only in the early nineteenth century. Some of the Aljamiado scrolls are kept in the Spanish National Library in Madrid.

Aljamiado did not end upon the Reconquista though, it found a repeat and reinterpretation upon the Spanish conquest of the Philippines wherein the Spanish encounter of Animist, Hindu, and Buddhist Filipinos as well as a re-encounter with Muslims among the Muslim Filipinos, resulted into a sequel of classical Spanish Aljamiado, in Filipino Aljamiado.

== Alphabet ==
=== Letters ===
Characters highlighted in green are not independent letters, but a shaddah is added to indicate a specific sound, for example baa' with a shaddah would indicate the p sound. Characters highlighted in yellow are only used for Arabic loanwords, and their Ladino equivalents are in accordance with the Judeo-Arabic orthographic traditions.

Aljamiado	Latin Equivalent	Ladino Equivalent	IPA	Notes
ا	-	א	[-]	This letter is used for three roles. As a carrier of vowel at the beginning of a word, for writing the [e] sound in combination with a diacritic, and for writing vowel hiatus.
ب	B b	ב בﬞ (ב׳)	[b]	
بّ	P p	פ	[p]	
ت	T t	ט	[t]	
ث	T t	תﬞ (ת׳)	[θ]	
ج	J j Ge ge ^{4} Gi gi	גﬞ (ג׳) זﬞ (ז׳)	[ʒ]	This letter has a dual pronunciation, depending on the letter after it. For this reason, both in Aljamiado and in Ladino, two different letters are used to represent it. The Ladino pronunciation differs from modern Spanish pronunciation.
جّ	Ch ch	גﬞ (ג׳)	[t͡ʃ]	
ح	H h	ח	[h]~[ħ]	
خ	J j H h	חﬞ (ח׳)	[x]	
د	D d	ד	[d]	Unlike the latin alphabet, aljamiado distinguishes between [d] and [ð] phonemes. The [d] phoneme is pronounced at the beginning of the word, after a nasal consonant ("m" or "n"), or after a lateral consonant ("l"). In all other cases it is pronounced [ð].
ذ	D d	דﬞ (ד׳)	[ð]	Unlike the latin alphabet, aljamiado distinguishes between [d] and [ð] phonemes. The [d] phoneme is pronounced at the beginning of the word, after a nasal consonant ("m" or "n"), or after a lateral consonant ("l"). In all other cases it is pronounced [ð].
ر	R r	ר	[ɾ]	
رّ	Rr rr R r	ר	[r]	
ز	Z z	ז	[dz]	
س	Ç ç Ce ce Ci ci S s Ss ss X x	ס	[ts] ([s]/[z])	This letter has a dual pronunciation, depending on the letter after it. For this reason, both in Aljamiado and in Ladino, two different letters are used to represent it. In old Spanish, the letter "X" was for representing the sound [ʃ]. But in some words, especially those that start with "ex-", the pronunciation of this letter is [s], [ks] or [gz].
ش	X x S s	ש	[ʃ]~[s]	In old Spanish, the letter "X" was for representing the sound [ʃ]. But in some words, especially those that start with "ex-", the pronunciation of this letter is [s], [ks] or [gz].
كس	X x^{7}	כּס	[ks]~[gz]	In old Spanish, the letter "X" was for representing the sound [ʃ]. But in some words, especially those that start with "ex-", the pronunciation of this letter is [s], [ks] or [gz].
ص ^{3}	S s	צ ץ	[s]	
ض ^{3}	Ld ld	צﬞ ץﬞ (צ׳ ץ׳)	[d]	
ط ^{3}	T t	ט	[t]	
ظ ^{3}	D d	טﬞ (ט׳)	[ð]	
ع ^{3}	'	ע	[ʕ]	
غ	G g Gu gu (except Ge ge Gi gi)	ג	[g]	This letter has a dual pronunciation, depending on the letter after it. For this reason, both in Aljamiado and in Ladino, two different letters are used to represent it.
ڢ (ف)	F f	פﬞ ף (פ׳)	[ɸ]~[f]	In the writing of Aljamiado, the Maghrebi script has been common, in which the placement and number of dot of on letters "fāʾ" and "qāf" are different from the conventional Arabic script, or the so-called "Mashriqī script" (مشرقي).
ڧ (ق)	K k Qu qu	ק	[q]~[k]	In the writing of Aljamiado, the Maghrebi script has been common, in which the placement and number of dot of on letters "fāʾ" and "qāf" are different from the conventional Arabic script, or the so-called "Mashriqī script" (مشرقي).
ك	K k Qu qu C c (except Ç ç Ce ce Ci ci)	ק	[k]	This letter has a dual pronunciation, depending on the letter after it. For this reason, both in Aljamiado and in Ladino, two different letters are used to represent it.
ل	L l	ל	[l]	
لّ	Ll ll	ליי	[ʎ]	
م	M m	מ ם	[m]	
ن	N n	נ ן	[n]	
نّ	Ñ ñ	ניי	[ɲ]	
و	W w V v	-ו	[w] ([v]~[β])	The letter "wāw" does not correspond to any exact letter in the Spanish Latin alphabet. This letter and its sound [w] are pronounced in certain digraphs and trigraphs. Worded differently, there are diphthongs and triphthongs as result of certain vowel sequences, where the sound [w] is pronounced and the letter "wāw" is used to write it.
هـ ه	H h	א / ה	[-]	
ي	Y y	י / יי / -י	[j]	The letter "y" in the Spanish Latin alphabet is equivalent to "yāʾ" (ي). But this letter is also used to write some consonant sequences, especially consonant sequences that have a sound similar to [j] in their pronunciation.

=== Vowels ===
Spanish has 5 vowels, which include [a], [e], [i], [o], [u]. In the Arabic language and alphabet, however, there are only 3 vowels, [a], [i], [u]. In Arabic, these 3 vowels have both a short form, which is represented by diacritics fatʾha, kasra, and ḍamma, and long forms, which are represented by the letters alif (ا), yaʾ (ي), and waw (و).

In Spanish, however, there is no difference between short and long vowels. In Aljamiado alphabet, 4 vowels are written as follows:

1. The vowel [a] is represented by the standard diacritic "◌َ".
2. The vowel [i] is represented by the standard diacritic "◌ِ".
3. The two vowels [o] and [u] are merged and are represented by the standard diacritic for [u] "◌ُ".
4. The vowel [e] is represented by the combination of fatʾha and alif "ـَـا".

In Aljamiado, similar to Arabic and Persian, when the vowel is at the beginning of the word, alif (ا) is used as the vowel carrier, except for the [e] sound. For the [e] sound, a hamza is used as a vowel carrier, followed by alif (ا). In Judaeo-Spanish (Ladino) as in Arabic, alif "א" plays the same role.

No distinction between unstressed or stressed vowels exist in Aljamiado manuscripts.

The Hebrew alphabet, like Arabic, has both diacritics, known as niqqud, and the use of three letters alef (א), vav (ו), and yod (י). In the Judaeo-Spanish alphabet, niqqud is not used, and only three aforementioned letters are used. Also, in addition to the merger of [o] and [u], two vowels [i] and [e] are also merged, and thus only three vowels are shown; as follows:

1. The vowel [a] is represented by alif "א".
2. The two vowels [e] and [i] are merged and represented by yod "י".
3. The two vowels [o] and [u] are merged and are represented by vav "ו".

Vowel at the beginning of the word
Latin equivalent	A/Á	E/É	I/Í	O/Ó	U/Ú
Aljamiado equivalent	اَ	ءَا	اِ	اُ	
Ladino equivalent	א	אי		או	

In the middle of the word in Aljamiado, only diacritics are used (and for the case of [e] a diacritic along with alif). In Ladino, the same three previously mentioned vowels are used.

Vowel in the middle or at the end of a word
Latin equivalent	a/á	e/é	i/í/y	o/ó	u/ú/w
Aljamiado equivalent	◌َ	◌َا	◌ِ	◌ُ	
Ladino equivalent	א (ה)	י		ו	

The letter hei (ה) is used when the vowel [a] is at the end of the word. This letter is the equivalent to the letter «ه، ـه» or «ة، ـة» in Persian and Arabic.

==== Vowel Sequences ====
In Spanish, vowels sequences fall into two general types, diphthongs and vowel hiatus. "Diphthong" means that in practice, a pair of sequential vowels are read as a single vowel under one syllable. "Vowel hiatus" means that two vowels are read as two consecutive separate syllables.

The pronunciation of vowels and their writing are subject to certain rules in the Spanish Latin Alphabet, as well as in Aljamiado. In Spanish, vowels are divided into two general groups: "strong" and "weak":

- Vowels [a], [e], [o] are classified as strong;
- Vowels [i], [u] are classified as weak.

As previously mentioned, in Aljamiado, there is no difference in writing between [o] and [u]. In Judaeo-Spanish, there's no difference between [o] and [u], nor between [e] and [i].

"Vowel hiatus" occurs when two strong vowels are sequential. In such a case, each vowel is read as part of a separate syllable. "Diphthong" occurs when one vowel is weak and the other is strong. In this case, Stress in pronunciation is on the strong vowel. Of course, there are exceptions to these rules.

The rules roughly are:

1. When it is a diphthong starting with [i], the first vowel is a diacritic as standard and the second vowel is placed as a diacritic of yā’ (ي), with an extra alif when "ie"
2. When it is a diphthong starting with [u], the first vowel is a diacritic as standard and the second vowel is placed as a diacritic of wāw (و), with an extra alif when "ue"
3. When it is a vowel hiatus, both vowels are followed by alif regardless of if they are [e] or not, except "au" which uses an alif to carry [u].

Below table outlines the general guidelines and some examples

Orthographic guideline of vowel sequences
Latin	Aljamiado	Ladino	Example
ia	◌ِيَـ / ◌ِيَ	יײא / יײה	Criatura كرِيَتُرَ קריאטורה
ie	◌ِيَا	יאי	Xavier شَّبِيَارْ שﬞאבﬞיאיר
io	◌ِيُـ / ◌ِيُ	ײו	Dios دِيُشْ דײוס
ua	◌ُوَ	וא	Cuales كُوَلَاشْ קואליס
ue	◌ُوَا	ואי	Pueder بُّوَاذَارْ פואידﬞיר
ui	◌ُاِ	ואי	Ruido رُاِذُ רואידﬞו
oé	◌ُاَا	ואי	Poeziya بَُاَازِيَ פואיזײה
éo	◌َااُ	יאו	judeoespañol جُذَااُ-ءَاشْبَّنُّلْ גﬞודﬞיאו־איספאנייול
áe	◌َاَا	אאי	Traer تْرَاَارْ טראאיר
au	◌َاُ	אאו	Aunque اَاُنْكَا אאונקי
éa	◌َااَ	יא	Realidad رَااَلِذَذْ ריאלידﬞאדﬞ

=== Original Consonant Letters ===
While the base Arabic script was suited for the Arabic language and used throughout the Muslim world, it lacked letters to represent many phonemes that were otherwise extremely common outside of semitic languages. Like other alphabets that adapted Arabic script, Aljamiado writing conventions invented letters to express consonants that they couldn't with the base set of characters.

Other Arabic-derived alphabets added dots to letters that closely matched the existing sound in the Arabic alphabet, but in Aljamiado they used a gemination mark on letters with the closest existing sound.

The Ladino alphabet also does the same thing with niqqud such as "Rafe" (רָפֶה) "◌ﬞ" or "Geresh" (גֶּרֶשׁ) "◌׳", for example "ב" produces the sound [b], and "בﬞ" or "ב׳" produce the sound [v].

Aljamiado	IPA	Latin Equivalent	Ladino Equivalent
بّ	[p]	P p	פ
جّ	[t͡ʃ]	Ch ch	גﬞ (ג׳)
رّ	[r]	Rr rr	ר
نّ	[ɲ]	Nn nn	ניי
لّ	[ʎ]	Ll ll	ליי

Notes

1. This sound, for the most part, has evolved out of existence in Modern Spanish. The "x" (شّ) now sounds like "j" ([x]) in most cases in modern Spanish.

Some letters simply adopted another value.

Letter	Transcription
ج	j [ʒ]~[x]
غ	g
س	ç
ش	x

The phoneme /β/ was typically represented by the letter ب (b), though in some instances it was represented by the letter ف (f). The plosive consonants were required to be aspirated; however, this aspect was lost in weaker positions such as the initial position of a word or an intervocalic position.

In Aljamiado texts, the letter ط was utilized to represent the phoneme /t/ in initial and intervocalic positions where it was unaspirated, while the letter ت was utilized in postconsonantal positions to indicate the aspirated form of the phoneme.

Similarly, the letter ﻕ was used to represent the phoneme /k/ in initial and intervocalic positions where it was unaspirated, and the letter ﻙ was used in postconsonantal positions to indicate the aspirated form. However, according to the glossary of Abuljair, the aspiration of plosive consonants never ceased to occur in any position.

=== B, V (ب) and P (بّ) ===
In Spanish language, the letter "B" has two allophones. If the letter is at the beginning of the word, or after a nasal consonant ("m" or "n"), it is pronounced as [b]. Otherwise, it is pronounced as [v~β]. The letter "v" also is pronounced as [v~β] regardless of position in the word.

In Aljamiado, no distinction is made between any one of these. The letter "baʾ" (ب) is used for all cases.

In Judeo-Spanish, distinction is made between these two allophones. Cases of [b] are written with the letter "beth" "ב". Whereas the sounds [v~β] are written with the letter "beth" with Rafe or Geresh "בﬞ (ב׳)". US Government Guide on Romanization of Ladino

As Arabic alphabet lacks a letter for the equivalent to the letter "P", the sound [p], in Aljamiado, a digraph has been created. This digraph consists of the letter "baʾ" and a shadda, "بّ".

This is not an issue in Judeo-Spanish, as the letter "Pe" has two possible pronunciations of [p] and [f]. Thus for the sound [p], the letter "pe" (פ) is used. For the sound [f], the letter "pe" plus Rafe or Geresh (פﬞ (פ׳) / ף) is used.

=== G, J (ج and خ) and Ch (جّ) ===
In Spanish, the letter "G" represents two pronunciations. If "G" is followed by "e", "i", or "y", it will have a "soft" pronunciation [x]. Otherwise, it will have a hard pronunciation [g].

In Spanish, the letter "J" has pronunciation identical with "soft G". In old Spanish, these two were pronounced as [ʒ‍~d͡ʒ]. Thus, the Aljamiado letter for both these sounds is reflective of this historic sound. The letter "jim" (ج) is used, as opposed to "khaʾ" (خ).

Similarly in Judeo-Spanish, the letter "gimel" plus Rafe or Geresh (גﬞ (ג׳)) has historically been used. In Modern Judeo-Spanish (Ladino), unlike varieties of Spanish, this historic pronunciation has been preserved. However, due to contact and influence from other languages, namely Serbo-Croatian, Turkish, and French, a distinction between [ʒ‍] and [d͡ʒ] in orthography has come to dominance. Namely that the former ([ʒ‍]) are shown with "zayn" Rafe or Geresh (זﬞ (ז׳)).

=== D (د and ذ) ===
Similar to the letter "B", the letter "D" represents two allophones in Spanish. If the letter is at the beginning of the word, or after a nasal consonant ("m" or "n"), it is pronounced as [d]. Otherwise, it is pronounced as [ð].

While this is not reflected in Latin alphabet, in Aljamiado manuscripts, as well as in Judeo-Spanish (not universally) is shown.

In instances where the pronunciation is [d], the letter "dal" (د) has been used in Aljamiado, and the letter "dalet" (ד) Judeo-Spanish.

In instances where the pronunciation is [ð], the letter "ḏal" (ذ) has been used in Aljamiado, and the letter "dalet" plus Rafe or Geresh (דﬞ (ד׳)) Judeo-Spanish.

=== R (ر) and Rr (رّ) ===
In Spanish Latin Alphabet, "r" versus "rr" denotes a difference in pronunciation, with the former being [ɾ] (Voiced alveolar tap), and the latter [r] (Voiced alveolar trill). This distinction is used in Aljamiado too with the use of shadda. The letter "r" being shown with "raʾ" (ر), and the "rr" with "raʾ-shadda" (رّ).

This distinction is not shown in Judeo-Spanish. Both cases are shown with a single "resh" (ר). In some regional varieties of Ladino, the distinction in pronunciation had ceased to exist as well.

=== Z (ز), Ç/S (س), and X (ش) ===
One of the notable evolutions in the Spanish language has been with respect to fricative-coronal consonants.

In old Spanish, the letter "z" was pronounced as [d͡z]. It is thus written in Aljamiado with the letter "zaʾ" (ز). In Judeo-Spanish, the letter "zayin" (ז) is used. However, in modern Spanish, the pronunciation of the letter "z" has evolved in two manners. In most dialects of European Spanish, the letter "z" today is pronounced identically as the soft pronunciation of the letter "c", as [θ]. In Latin American dialects, the letter "z" is pronounced identically as the letter "s" and the soft pronunciation of the letter "c", as [s].

The letter "c" has two pronunciations in Spanish, based on rules and factors, hard and soft C. "c" is pronounced "soft" if it is followed by "e", "i", or "y", or if it is given a cedilla accent (ç). In other cases, "c" is pronounced as "hard", as a [k].

In old Spanish, the soft pronunciation of "c" was as [t͡s]. In Aljamiado, this letter was uniquely assigned the letter "sin" (س). In Judeo-Spanish, the letter "samech" (ס) was used.

However, in modern Spanish, the soft pronunciation of the letter "c" has evolved in two manners. In most dialects of European Spanish, the letter "c" today is pronounced identically as the letter "z", as [θ]. In Latin American dialects, the soft pronunciation of the letter "c" is pronounced identically as the letter "s" and "z", as [s].

In old Spanish, the letter "s" was pronounced as [s] or [z], distinct from the soft pronunciation of the letter "c". The digraph "ss" represented [s] as well, but has since been replaced with a single "s" in Spanish orthography. To reflect the difference between "s" and soft pronunciation of "c", in Aljamiado, the letter "shin" (ش) was given a new association and sound, and was used to write "s". Similarly, in Judeo-Spanish, letter "shin" (ש) was used.

In modern Judeo-Spanish, in the centuries after expulsion of Jews from Spain, as the pronunciations of "c" and "s" merged independently of Spanish, confusion ensued for a few decades, with both "samech" (ס) and "shin" (ש) being used interchangeably. Today, the letter "samech" (ס) has won out and is used exclusively.

In old Spanish, the letter "x" had a pronunciation as [ʃ]. In Aljamiado, the letter "shin" (ش) was used. In Judeo-Spanish, the letter "shin" has been used, historically with niqqud Rafe or Geresh (שﬞ (ש׳)). But in modern times, without any (ש).

In modern Spanish, the pronunciation of "x" has evolved. In most cases, it is now pronounced as the letter "j" would, [x]. This is reflected in orthography as well. In Judeo-Spanish, the original pronunciation has been retained.

In some instances, especially in beginning of words as "ex-", the letter "x" has preserved an [s] sound, or a [ks] sound. In Judeo-Spanish this is reflected mostly by "gimel+zayin" (גז) and in some other words as "koph+samech" (קס).

== Other uses ==
The practice of Jews writing Romance languages such as Spanish, Aragonese or Catalan in the Hebrew script is also referred to as aljamiado.

The word aljamiado is sometimes used for other non-Semitic language written in Arabic letters:

- Bosnian and Albanian texts written in Arabic script during the Ottoman period have been referred to as aljamiado. However, many linguists prefer to limit the term to Romance languages, instead using Arebica to refer to the use of Arabic script for Slavic languages like Bosnian.
- The word Aljamiado is also used to refer to Greek written in the Arabic/Ottoman alphabet.

== Text sample ==
Article 1 of the Universal Declaration of Human Rights:

English Translation	All human beings are born free and equal in dignity and rights. They are endowed with reason and conscience and should act towards one another in a spirit of brotherhood.
Spanish (Latin)	Todos los seres humanos nacen libres e iguales en dignidad y derechos y, dotados como están de razón y conciencia, deben comportarse fraternalmente los unos con los otros.
Aljamiado	تُذُشْ لُشْ شَارَاشْ اُمَنُشْ نَسَانْ لِبرَاشْ ءَا اِغُوَلَاشْ ءَان دِغْنِتَذْ اِ دَارَاجُّشْ، اِ دُتَذُشْ كُمُ ءَاشْتَنْ دَا رَّسُنْ اِ كُنْسِيَانسِيَ، دَابَانْ كُنْبُّرتَرْشَا ڢْرَتَارْنَلْمَانْتَا لُشْ اُنُشْ كُنْ لُشْ اُتْرُشْ.
Ladino	טודﬞוס לוס סיריס אומאנוס נאסין ליבﬞריס אי איגואליס אין דיניידﬞאדﬞ אי דיריגﬞוס אי, דוטאדﬞוס קומו איסטאן די ראזון אי קונסיינסיה, דיבﬞין קומפורטארסין פﬞראטירנאלמינטי לוס אונוס קון לוס אוטרוס.

The Poema de Yuçuf is a poem written in Aragonese in Aljamiado in the fourteenth century. Strophe 17 and 59 are presented below:

Aragonese (Latin)	Aljamiado	English Translation
Non querás que finque sin padre y sin madre, y non querás que muera desamparado de fambre; dadme agua de fuente o de río o de mare...	نُن كَارَس كَا فِنكَا سِن بَّذرَا اِ سِن مَذرَ اِ نُن كَارَس كَا مُوَارَ دَاسَمبَّرَذُ دَا فَمبرَا دَذمَا اعُوَ دَا فُوَانتَا اُ دَا رِيُ اُ دَا مَرَا	You would not want me to be left without father and without mother, and you would not want me to die helpless and hungry; give me water from fountain, or river, or sea...
Cuando entroron por la villa, las gentes se maravellaban; el día era nublo y él lo aclaría, maguer que yera escuro, él bien lo blanquiaba, e non pasó por escura que no la feziese él alborada.	كُوَندُ اَانترُرُن بُّر لَ بِلّ لَس جَانتَاس سَا مَرَبَالَّبَن اَال دِيَ اَارَ نُبلُ اِ اَال لُ اَكلَرِيَ مَعَار كَا يَارَ اَاسكُرُ اَال بِيَان لُ بلَنكِيَبَ اَا نُن بَّسُ بُّر اَاسكُرَ كَا نُ لَ فيزِيَاسَا اَال اَلبُرَذَ	When they entered the town, the people marveled at them; the day was cloudy but he cleared the sky, though it was dark, he made it very bright, and he didn't pass through any darkness that he did not make dawn.

== See also ==
- Ajami script – Arabic-derived script used to write non-Arabic languages
- Arabic Afrikaans – Variant of Arabic script used to write the Afrikaans language
- Arebica – Serbo-Croatian variant of the Arabic script
- Belarusian Arabic alphabet – Arabic-based alphabet for Belarusian
- Elifbaja shqip – Writing system for the Albanian language during the Ottoman Empire
- Jawi (script) – Arabic alphabet used in Southeast Asia
- Judeo-Spanish – Romance language historically spoken by Sephardi Jews
- Karamanli Turkish – Greek-written Turkish dialect of the Karamanlides
- Kharja – Final refrain of a muwashshah
- Mozarabic language – Medieval Romance dialects of Al-Andalus
- Pegon script – Javanese-Arabic script
- Xiaoerjing – Writing system for Chinese in the Perso-Arabic script
