= Ismail Alieksandrovič =

Belarusian mufti (1929–2024)

- Ісмаіл Александровіч
- Born: 18 July 1929; Kleck, Poland (now Belarus)
- Died: 25 September 2024 (aged 95); Minsk, Belarus
- Occupation: Mufti of the Muslim Religious Community of the Republic of Belarus
- Years active: 1990–2005

Ismail Mustafavič Alieksandrovič (Belarusian: Ісмаіл Мустафавіч Александровіч; Russian: Исмаил Мустафович Александрович, Ismail Mustafovich Aleksandrovich; 18 July 1929 – 25 September 2024) was a Belarusian mufti who was leader of the Muslim Religious Community of the Republic of Belarus from its founding in 1994 until 2005.

== Early life ==
Alieksandrovič was born on 18 July 1929 in Kletsk, in what was then the Second Polish Republic. In his early years, he received an Islamic education from his family in addition to secular education. His family was significant in the Kletsk Muslim community; his father, Mustafa Jasufovič Alieksandrovič, was elected imam in 1939, and held the position until being coerced into resignation by the government of the Soviet Union in 1953. The same year, Ismail graduated from the Belarusian National Technical University as a civil engineer.

From 1954 to 1956, Alieksandrovič worked as a foreman at a construction site in Magnitogorsk, and also served as senior works manager and chief engineer of Chelyabinsk Oblast Construction Board of the Russian Soviet Federative Socialist Republic. From 1961 to 1986, he worked as an engineer in Minsk, before retiring in 1989.

== Religious career ==
In 1994, during the First All-Belarusian Congress of Muslims, Alieksandrovič was elected to serve as mufti of the Muslim Religious Community of the Republic of Belarus. In 1996 and 1998, he was re-elected to this position. From 1990, he also participated in the Al-Kitab Association of Tatar Muslims, a global organisation of Lipka Tatars.

Alieksandrovič's efforts bore fruit in reviving the Belarusian Muslim community; when he first took office as mufti, there were 11 Muslim communities in Belarus and one mosque. By the time of the Third Congress, there were 24 communities and 4 mosques.

== Death ==
Alieksandrovič died on 25 September 2024, at the age of 95.
