= Poema de Yuçuf =

14th century poem written in Aragonese in the Aljamiado Arabic script

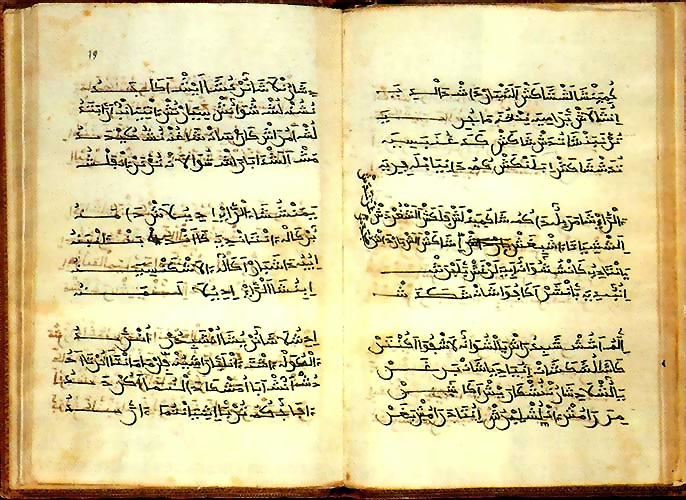
Manuscrito B of the Poema de Yuçuf

The Poema de Yuçuf or Poema de Yusuf is an anonymous poem written in Aragonese in the Aljamiado Arabic script from the fourteenth century. It was written in a strophic form called "cuaderna vía" by a Morisco poet. The text was discovered incomplete, but 380 verses have been preserved.

== Manuscripts and origins ==
The poem has been passed on two codices. The most complete is Manuscript B, written, according to Ramón Menéndez Pidal in a very Hispanicised Aragonese, while Manuscript A uses phonetic, morphosyntactic, and lexical features more typical of Aragonese. According to Menéndez Pidal, the poem dates from approximately the second half of the fourteenth century, and is directed toward mudéjars.

== Summary ==
The poem recounts the story of the patriarch Joseph, one of the twelve sons of Jacob, not as recorded in the Old Testament but rather in the Islamic tradition. Its content reflects a commentary on Sūrat Yūsuf—the twelfth sūrah of the Qur'an—and Golden Legend by Jacobus de Voragine and the Sēfer ha-Yāšār—a Hebrew midrash and collection of legends.

The poem relates the story of Joseph (Yuçuf) and the jealousy he aroused in his brothers, who mistreated him and abandoned him. Yuçuf was sold as a slave and brought to Egypt, where he is trained by Zalifa, the wife of Potiphar. She, along with her ladies, fall in love with Yuçuf, in part due to their admiration for his miracles and predictions. His brothers and father believe him dead, but a wolf reveals to Jacob that his favourite son is still alive. Yuçuf falls into disgrace and is imprisoned, but his ability to interpret the dreams of the servants of the king wins his freedom. The story ends (in Manuscript B, the more complete of the two) with the summoning of his brothers to Egypt, the anagnorisis of his younger brother Benjamin, who loved Yuçuf so much, and the return of the others, ashamed by their earlier behaviour.

== Style ==
According to Antonio Pérez Lasheras, the poem shines with the poet's emotional expressive ability. He highlights passages of lyrical intensity, despite the poet's obligation to conform to the well-known development of the narrative. He provides as an example Yuçuf's lament, after he has been beaten and caned by his brothers (strophe 17):

Non querás que finque sin padre y sin madre,
y non querás que muera desamparado de fambre;
dadme agua de fuente o de río o de mare...

Translation:

You would not want me to be left without father and without mother,
and you would not want me to die helpless and hungry;
give me water from fountain, or river, or sea...

Later, we find another lyrical description of the landscape and environment, a rare occurrence in romance literature of this period, though less so for the Andalusian tradition (strophe 59):

Cuando entroron por la villa, las gentes se maravellaban;
el día era nublo y él lo aclaría,
maguer que yera escuro, él bien lo blanquiaba,
e non pasó por escura que no la feziese él alborada.

Translation:

When they entered the town, the people marveled at them;
the day was cloudy but he cleared the sky,
though it was dark, he made it very bright,
and he didn't pass through any darkness that he did not make dawn.

== Bibliography ==
- Deyermond, Alan D., Historia de la literatura española, vol. 1: La Edad Media, Barcelona, Ariel, 2001 (1st ed. 1973), pp. 214–215. ISBN 84-344-8305-X
- Johnson, W. W., The Poema de Jose: A Transcription and Comparison of the Extant Manuscripts (Mississippi, 1974)
- Klenk, U., La leyenda de Yūsuf. Ein Aljamiadotext, Berlin 1972
- Menéndez Pidal, Ramón, Poema de Yuçuf: Materiales para su estudio, Granada, Universidad de Granada, 1952, pp. 62–63
- Pérez Lasheras, Antonio, La literatura del reino de Aragón hasta el siglo XVI, Zaragoza, Ibercaja-Institución «Fernando el Católico» (Biblioteca Aragonesa de Cultura, 15), 2003, pp. 143–144. ISBN 84-8324-149-8
