= Smilavichy =

Urban-type settlement in Minsk Region, Belarus

Smilavichy Смілавічы (Belarusian) Смиловичи (Russian)
- Urban-type settlement
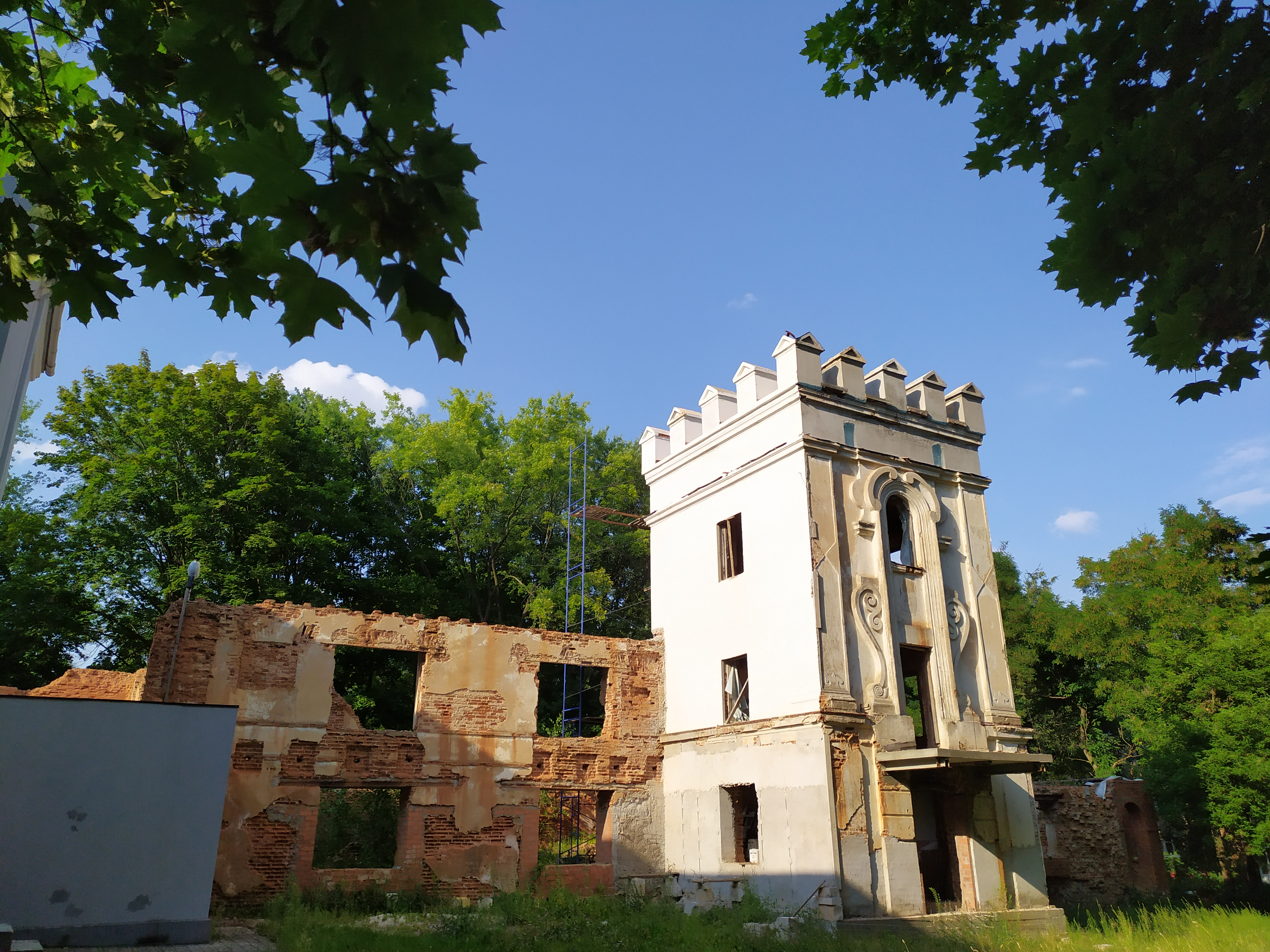

- Location within Belarus
- Coordinates: 53°44′54″N 28°00′33″E
- Country: Belarus
- Region: Minsk Region
- District: Chervyen District

Population (2026)
  - Total: 6,870
- Time zone: UTC+3 (MSK)

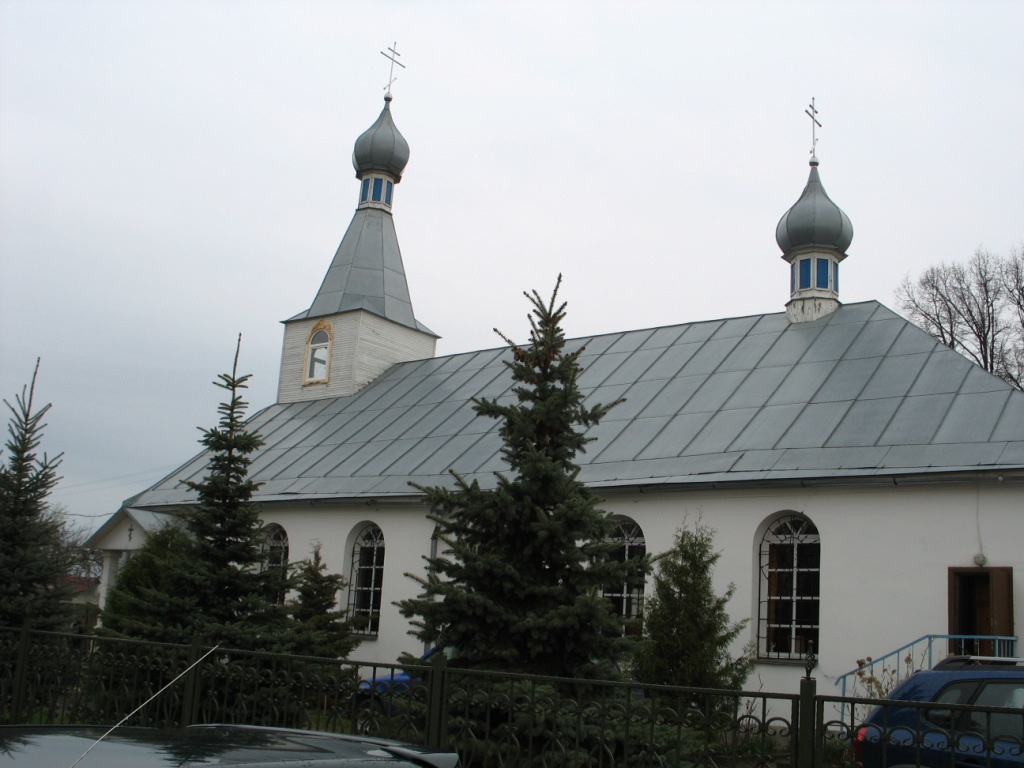
Saint George's Church, Smilavichy

Smilavichy (Note: Belarusian: Смілавічы, romanized: Smilavičy; Russian: Смиловичи, romanized: Smilovichi; Polish: Śmiłowicze; Yiddish: סמילאָוויץ, romanized: Smilovitz.) is an urban-type settlement in Chervyen District, Minsk Region, Belarus. As of 2026, it has a population of 6,870.

In Jewish tradition it is known as Smilovitz, and was a shtetl in the Russian Empire.

== Notable people ==
- Ibrahim Kanapacki (1949–2005), Belarusian Lipka Tatar religious, political, and cultural leader
- Chaïm Soutine (1893–1943), painter
