= Jawi =

Jawi may refer to:

== People and languages ==
=== Australia ===
Also spelled Djaui, Dyawi, or Chowie:

- Jawi dialect, a nearly extinct Australian aboriginal language
- Jawi people, an Australian Aboriginal people of the Kimberley coast of Western Australia, who speak or spoke the Jawi dialect

=== Southeast Asia ===
- Jawi script, an Arabic script developed for writing Malay and other languages in Southeast Asia
  - Kelantan–Pattani Malay, sometimes called Jawi due to being written in Jawi script

== Places ==
- Jawi (woreda), a woreda or district in the Amhara Region of Ethiopia
- Jawi, Penang, a town in the state of Penang, Malaysia
- Jawi (state constituency), state constituency in Penang, Malaysia
- Jawi Temple, a 13th-century syncretic Hindu-Buddhist temple in East Java, Indonesia
