= Lowchytsy =

Village in Grodno Region, Belarus

Lowchytsy Лоўчыцы (Belarusian)
- Village
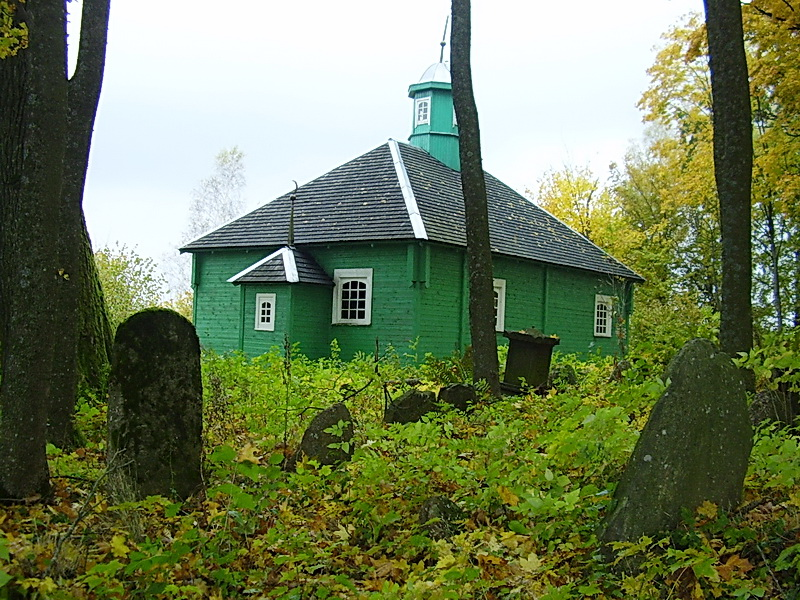
- Mosque

- Location within Belarus
- Coordinates: 53°36′46″N 25°44′41″E
- Country: Belarus
- Region: Grodno Region
- District: Novogrudok District

Population
  - Total: 16
- Time zone: UTC+3 (MSK)
- Area code: +375 1597
- License plate: 4

Lowchytsy (Belarusian: Лоўчыцы, romanized: Loŭčycy; (Note: Official transliteration.) Russian: Ловчицы, romanized: Lovchitsy; Polish: Łowczyce) is a village in Novogrudok District, Grodno Region, Belarus. As of 2009, approximately 16 people live in the village.

== History ==
According to legend, the area was granted by King Stephen Báthory to a łowczy of Tatar origin, and named after the title.

According to the 1921 census, the village had a population of 125, 96% Polish and 4% Belarusian.

=== Islamic history ===
Lowchytsy was historically a site of pilgrimage for Lipka Tatar Muslims, dating back to at least 1558. Compared to Mecca and Medina, the two holiest cities in Islam, pilgrimages declined due to the anti-religious policy of the Soviet Union. The original mosque, built in 1688, was rebuilt in 2002.

Lowchytsy was particularly an important site for Sufism in Belarus. The tomb of wali Eŭlii Kontus, a shepherd who possessed the power to heal the sick and crippled, as well as travel to Mecca in an instant, was an important site for Sufis in the Polish–Lithuanian Commonwealth and Russian Empire.
