= Belarusian Arabic alphabet =

Arabic-based alphabet for Belarusian

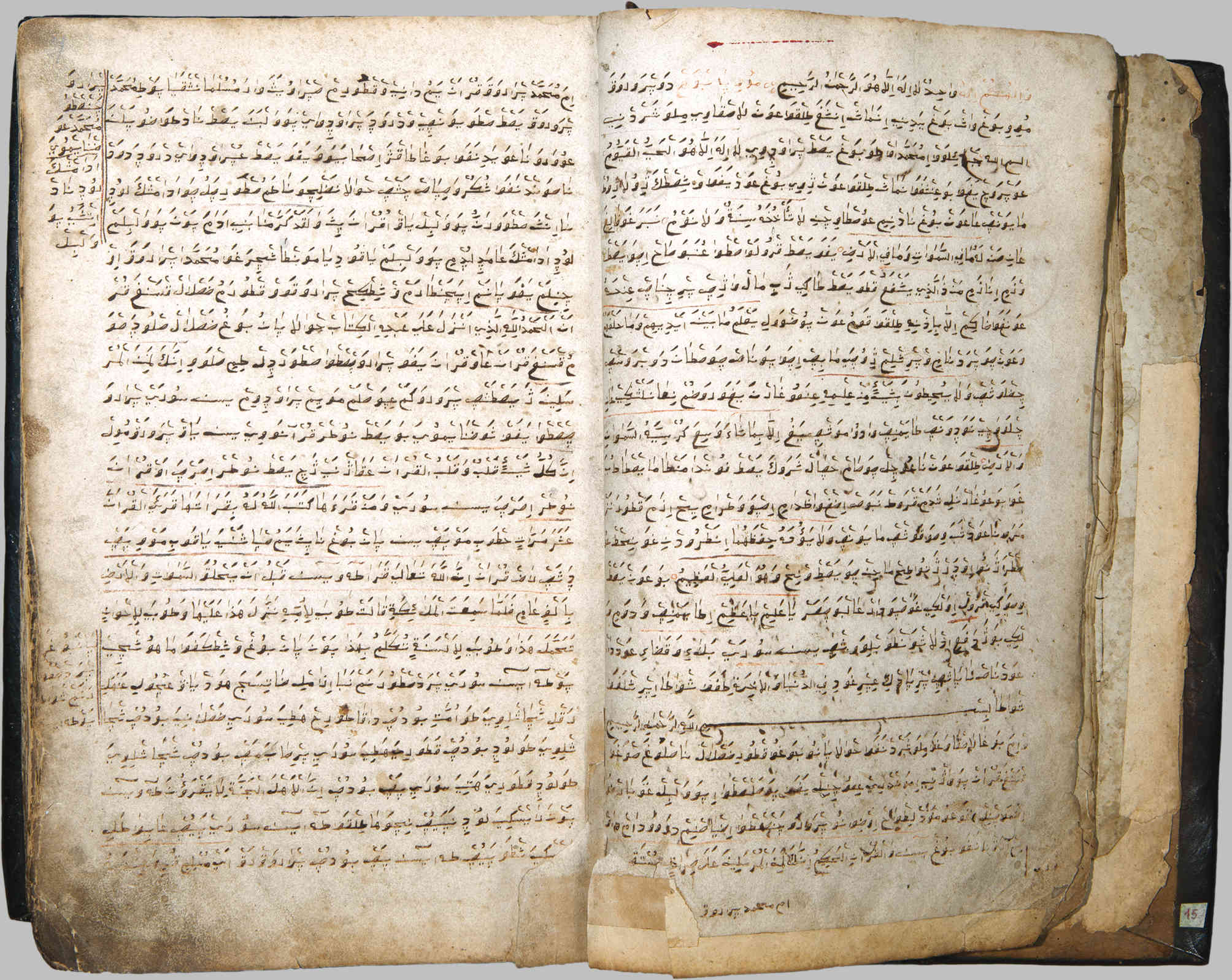
Kitab in Arabitsa, c. 1750-1800

Basic summary of the letters and the functioning of Belarusian Arabic alphabet

The Belarusian Arabic alphabet (Note: Belarusian: Беларускі арабскі алфавіт / بلاروسكى آرابسكى آلفاوىط, romanized: Biełaruski arabski ałfavit) or the Belarusian Arabica (Note: بلاروصقایا آرابیࢯا, Беларуская Арабіца, Biełaruskaja Arabica) was based on the Perso-Arabic script and was developed in the 15th or 16th century. It consisted of 28 graphemes, including several additions to represent Belarusian phonemes not found in the Arabic language.

The Belarusian Arabic alphabet was used by the Lipka Tatars, who had been invited to settle in the eastern territories of the Grand Duchy of Lithuania—a region that now comprises modern-day Belarus. During the 14th–16th centuries they gradually stopped using their own language and started using the Ruthenian language (modern Belarusian and Ukrainian) rendered in the Belarusian Arabic alphabet. Books of that literary tradition are known in Belarusian as Kitab (Belarusian: Кітаб), which is Arabic for 'book' or 'written material'.

Example of text in Arabitsa

Some Polish texts were also written in the Arabic script in the 17th century or later.

== Additional graphemes ==
- For the sounds /ʒ/ (ж), /t͡ʃ/ (ч) and /p/ (п), which are absent from the Arabic language, the following Persian graphemes were used:

ژ چ پ

- For denoting the soft /d͡zʲ/ (дзь) and /t͡s/ (ц) sounds, the following newly constructed graphemes were used:

ࢮ ࢯ

These graphemes were used during the 16th–20th centuries to write Belarusian and Polish.

- The sounds /w/ (ў) and /v/ (в) were both represented by the same symbol:

و

== Equivalence chart ==
=== Vowels ===
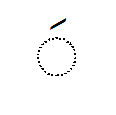
Vowels A and E (initial اَ)

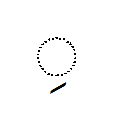
Vowels I and Y (initial اِ)

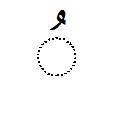
Vowels U and O (initial اُ)

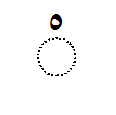
No vowel

Consonant gemination

/a/ is consistently written long (that is, with a mater lectionis), while /e/ is consistently written short.

/o/ is most commonly written long.

Consonants
ا	ب	پ	ت	ث	ج	چ	ح	د	ࢮ	ر	ز	ژ	ش	ࢯ	ص	ض	ط	غ	ف	ق	ك	ل	م	ن	ه	و	ي
Transliteration on Wiktionary
	b	p	tʹ	sʹ	dž	č	x	d	dzʹ	r	zʹ	ž	š	c	s	z	t	g	f	k	kʹ	l	m	n	h	v	j
Belarusian Arabic Cyrillic equivalent
	б	п	ть	сь	дж	ч	х	д	дзь	р	зь	ж	ш	ц	с	з	т	кг	ф	к	кь	л	м	н	г	в	й
Transliteration by Antonovich (1968)
ˈ	б	п	т́	с́	дж	ч	х	д	дз	р	з́	ж	ш	ц	с	з	т	г̣	ф	к	ќ	л	м	н	г	в	й
	b	p	tʼ	sʼ	dž	č	x	d	dʼzʼ	r	zʼ	ž	š	c	s	z	t	g	f	k	kʼ	l	m	n	h	v	j
Transliteration by Projekt “Tefsir”
	b	p	ť	ś	ǯ	č	x	d	ʒ	r	ź	ž	š	c	s	z	t	g	f	k	ḱ	l	m	n	h	w	j

Vowels
◌َ	ا◌َ	اَ	ي◌َ	و◌َ	اَو	◌ُ	اُ	و◌ُ	اُو	◌ِ	اِ	ي◌ِ	اِي	◌ّ	◌ْ
Transliteration on Wiktionary
◌e	◌a	a	◌ā	◌o	o	◌u, ◌ô	u, ô	◌ū, ◌ō	ū, ō	◌i	i	◌ī	ī	◌◌	◌
Belarusian Arabic Cyrillic equivalent
е	а			о		у, о				и, ы					
Transliteration by Antonovich (1968)
е	а		а̄	о		у, о̂		ӯ, о̄		и		ӣ			
e	a			o		u, o				i, y					
Transliteration by Projekt “Tefsir”
e	a		ā	o		u, o		ū, ō		i		ī			

Duplicate letters and diacritics:

Consonants
خ	ذ	ڛ	س	ظ	ع	ء	ى	ڬ	ڭ	ة
Transliteration on Wiktionary
x̣	ẓʹ	s̱ʹ	ṣʹ	ẓ	ʽ	ʼ	j	g̣	nʹ	ṭʹ
Belarusian Arabic Cyrillic equivalent
х	зь	сь		з			й	кг	нь	ть
Transliteration by Antonovich (1968)
х̇	з̀	с̨̀	с̀	з̣	ʽ	ʼ				т́
x	zʼ	sʼ		z						tʼ
Transliteration by Projekt “Tefsir”
x̱	z̀	s̱	s̀	ẕ	ʿ	ʾ		g	ŋ	ṯ

Vowels
◌ٰ	ي◌ٰ	آ	عَا	عَ	عَو	عُ	عُو	وا◌ُ	عِ	ي◌ٖ
Transliteration on Wiktionary
◌ȧ	◌ā̇	ã	ʽa	ʽe	ʽo	ʽu, ʽô	ʽū, ʽō	◌ū̇, ◌ō̇	ʽi	◌ī̇
Belarusian Arabic Cyrillic equivalent
а				е	о	у, о			и, ы	
Transliteration by Antonovich (1968)
а̍	а̄̍	а̃	ʽа	ʽе	ʽо	ʽу, ʽо̂	ʽӯ, ʽо̄	ӯˈ, о̄ˈ	ʽи	ӣ̩
a				e	o	u, o			i, y	
Transliteration by Projekt “Tefsir”
a		a	ʿa	ʿe	ʿo	ʿu, ʿo	ʿū, ʿō		ʿi	

=== Sample text ===
Below is a sample text, Article 1 of the Universal Declaration of Human Rights.

Belarusian Cyrillic alphabet	Усе людзі нараджаюцца свабоднымі i роўнымі ў сваёй годнасці i правах. Яны надзелены розумам i сумленнем i павінны ставіцца адзін да аднаго ў духу брацтва.
Belarusian Latin alphabet	Usie ludzi naradžajucca svabodnymi i roŭnymi ŭ svajoj hodnaści i pravach. Jany nadzieleny rozumam i sumlenniem i pavinny stavicca adzin da adnaho ŭ duchu bractva.
Belarusian Arabic alphabet	اُثَ لْيُࢮِ نَارَاجَايُࢯَّا صْوَابَودْنِيمِ اِ رَواُنِيمِ اُ صْوَايَويْ هَودْنَاثࢯِ اِ پْرَاوَاحْ. يَانِي نَاࢮَلَنِي رَوضُمَامْ اِ صُملَنَّمْ اِ پَاوِنِّي صْطَاوِࢯَّا اَاࢮِنْ دَا اَادْنَاهَو اُ دُحُ بْرَاࢯْطْوَا.
Latin transcription	Usʹe ljudzʹi naradžajucca svabodnīmi i rounīmi u svajoj hodnasʹci i pravax. Janī nadzʹelenī rozumam i sumlennem i pavinnī stavicca adzʹin da adnaho u duxu bractva.
Belarusian IPA transcription	[u̯sʲe ˈlʲud͡zʲɪ nərɐˈd͡ʐajʊt͡sːə svɐˈbodnɨmʲɪ i ˈrou̯nɨmʲɪ u̯ svɐˈjoj ˈɦodnəsʲt͡sʲɪ i prɐˈvax ‖ jɐˈnɨ nɐˈd͡zʲelʲɪnɨ ˈrozʊməm i sʊˈmlʲenʲːɪm i pɐˈvʲinːɨ ˈstavʲɪt͡sːə ɐˈd͡zʲin da ədnɐˈɦo u̯ ˈduxʊ ˈbrat͡stvə ‖]
English translation	All human beings are born free and equal in dignity and rights. They are endowed with reason and conscience and should act towards one another in a spirit of brotherhood.

== See also ==
- Belarusian Latin alphabet
- Arebica – modified Arabic script used for Serbo-Croatian
