= Djawi-Hisworo =

Dutch East Indian newspaper (1909-1919)

Djawi-Hisworo was a newspaper printed in Surakarta, Dutch East Indies from 1909 to 1919 in Malay and Javanese. It was considered the mouthpiece of the early Javanese self-improvement organization Boedi Oetomo.

== History ==
=== Origin of Djawi-Hisworo ===
The founder of Djawi-Hisworo, Raden Martodharsono had worked in the court of the rulers of Surakarta (Susuhunan) in the 1890s, but was arrested and jailed in Lombok in 1894 on charges of counterfeiting or forgery. He managed to escape to Sumatra where he was arrested once again and forced to serve his sentence there.

After being released, he returned to Java, and ended up in Bandung. There, he ended up working as an editor for Tirto Adhi Soerjo at Medan Prijaji, a pioneering newspaper in the Indonesian National Awakening. He then returned to his home city of Surakarta and set about to found his own newspaper. The year it was founded is unclear; Ahmat Adam lists it tentatively as 1906, whereas Agung Dwi Hartanto and Takashi Shiraishi list it as 1909. Martodharsono edited it alongside another newspaper, Djawi Kanda; according to Shiraishi, Djawi-Hisworo "was the outgrowth of the Malay section" of that paper. It was printed with the first two pages in Malay and the second two pages in Javanese (in Hanacaraka script).

=== Conflict with Tjokroaminoto and the Sarekat Islam ===
Today Djawi-Hisworo is mainly remembered for coming into conflict with the Sarekat Islam in 1918. In January 1918, the newspaper published a satirical article which portrayed Muhammad as a drunk and an opium smoker. Tjokroaminoto, a Sarekat Islam leader, launched a campaign against the newspaper, called the TKNM committee (short for Tentara Kandjeng Nabi Mohammad, Malay: Lord Prophet Muhammad's Army). In the pages of Oetoesan Hindia in February 1918, Tjokroaminoto called for a boycott of the Djawi-Hisworo, and called upon the Susuhunan, ostensibly protectors of Muslims in their realm, to not allow this type of material to be published in their city. According to Natalie Mobini-Kesheh, the objective may have been partly to try and stop the exodus of Arab Indonesians from the Sarekat Islam, who had been turned off by its hard turn to the left in recent years. European newspaper in the Indies played up the supposed fanaticism of Muslims who were holding rallies around this matter, but Tjokoroaminoto, addressing an audience of TKNM supporters in Surabaya, said that blame for riots and violence is often put upon Islam whenever they occur, and not unjust taxation, prejudiced treatment, and so on. He denied that the TKNM had been formed to punish Djawi-Hisworo; he said that there were many underlying issues and that just happened to be an event that convinced them to act. He also denied that their goal was to have the government punish or prosecute the editors of Djawi-Hisworo over this matter, but that he would like the government to explain what its position was on matters such as this.

=== End of Djawi-Hisworo ===
At some point during the controversy, Martodharsono stepped down as editor of the paper. However, in April 1919 he announced he was returning from his period of rest and was head editor once again. However, Djawi-Hisworo did not last much longer. The newspaper ceased publication in late 1919. It is difficult to say whether the boycott campaign was to blame, or other reasons, because the newspaper industry in the Indies was not often a profitable business to begin with.
