= Nardaran Fortress =

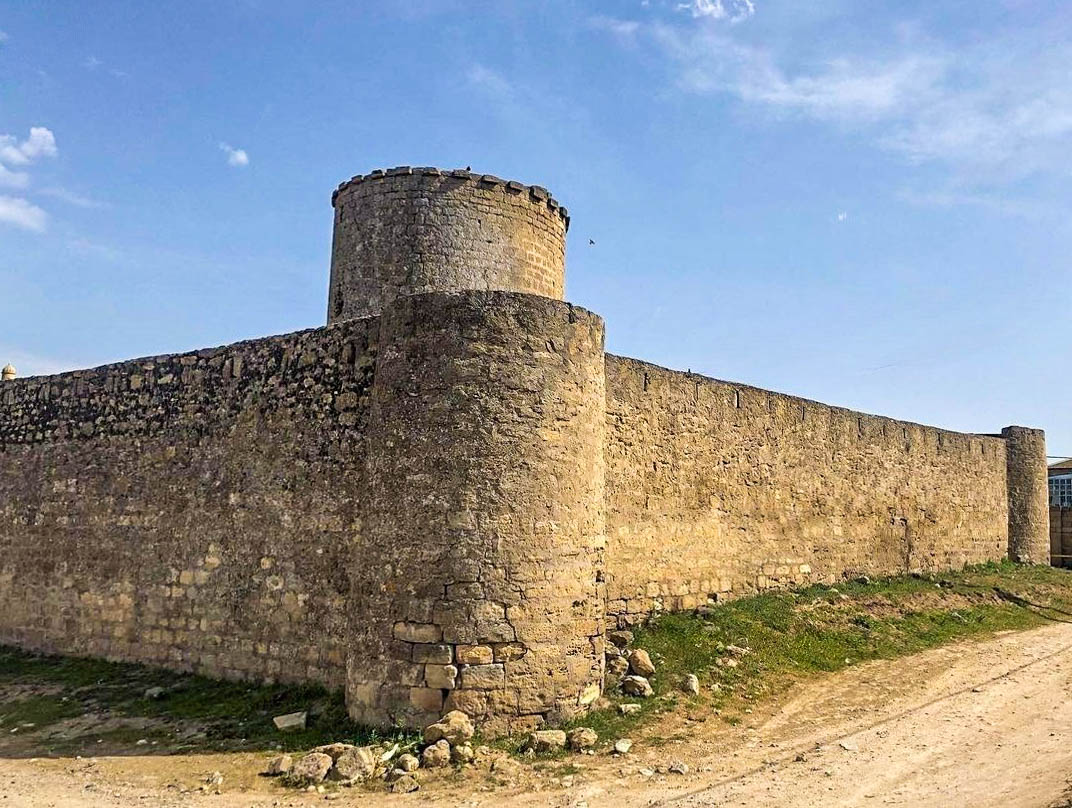
- Nardaran Fortress
- Interactive map of the Nardaran Fortress area

General information
- Location: Nardaran, Baku, Azerbaijan
- Coordinates: 40°33′41.0″N 50°00′17.2″E
- Completed: 1301

Design and construction
- Architect: Mahmud ibn Sa'd

Nardaran Fortress (Azerbaijani: Nardaran qalası, Persian: قلعه نارداران) is a historical and architectural monument located in the Nardaran settlement of the Sabunçu district in Baku. The fortress has been registered as a monument of global significance by the Ministry of Culture and Tourism of the Republic of Azerbaijan. In 2001, the Nardaran Fortress, along with other Caspian defense structures, was included in UNESCO's Tentative List.

The Nardaran Fortress was built during the time of the Shirvanshahs and consists of fortress walls enclosing a square-shaped courtyard and a cylindrical tower located at the center of the courtyard. Local stone was used in the construction of the fortress.

== History ==
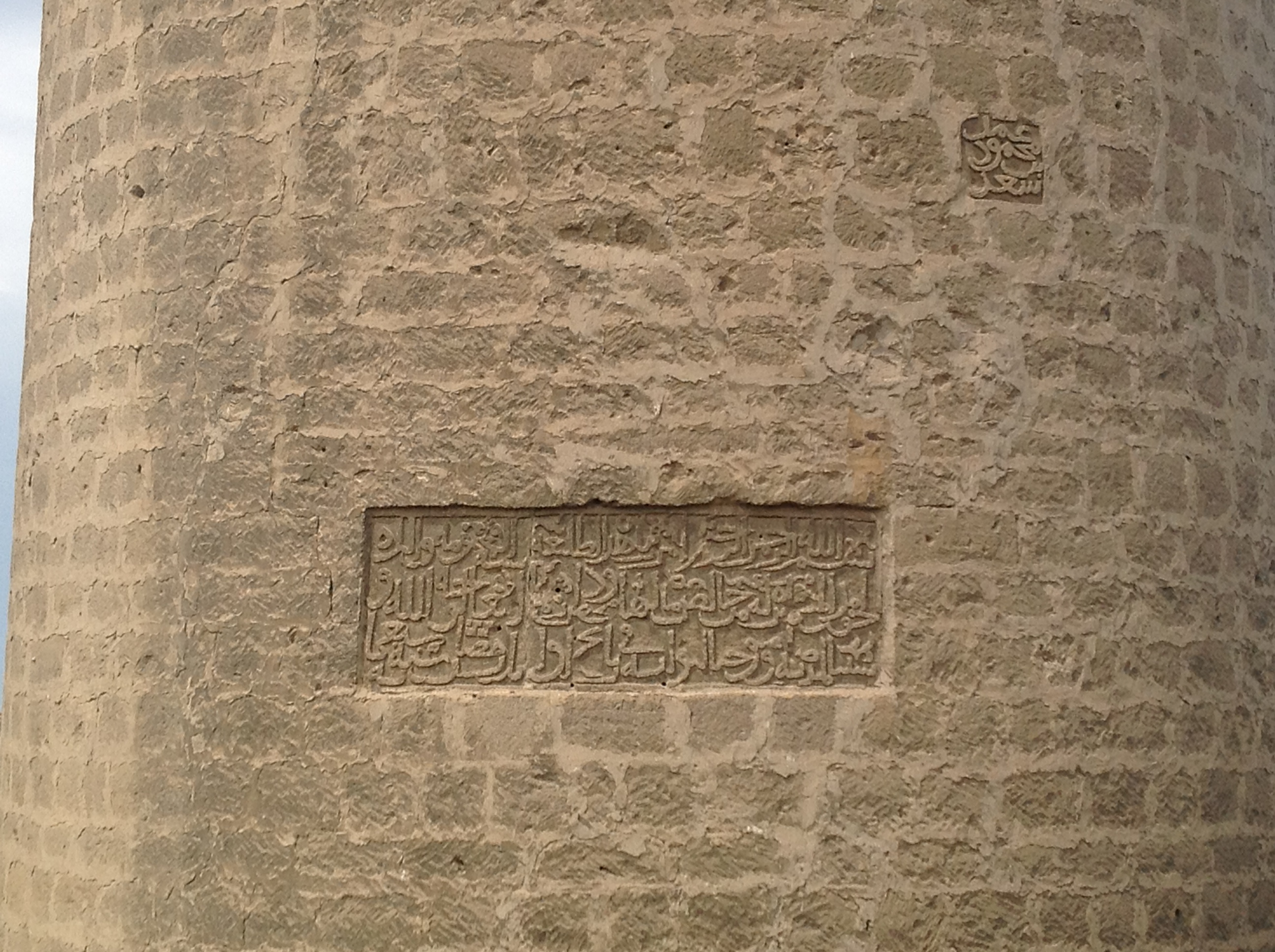
Two construction inscriptions placed on the facade of the castle keep

Two inscriptions on the facade of the fortress tower indicate that the structure was built in the Hijri year 700 (1301 AD) by architect Mahmud ibn Sad (or Mahmud ibn Said) .

The larger inscription, located at the height of the second tier above the entrance to the tower, states:

“In the name of the all-merciful Allah! Mother…Barikat…ordered to build this building on her own means and dirhams for beholding Allah, to please him and to deserve all his rewards. On the date of Ramadan of the 700th year “(700-1301)”.

The smaller inscription, located slightly above the first one and on the eastern side, states: "The work of Mahmud, son of Sa'd."

This architect also designed and constructed the Bibi-Heybat Mosque in Baku Bay and the Molla Ahmad Mosque in Icherisheher, built in 1300, which also bears the architect's name on its inscription.

All three monuments testify to the architect's extraordinary talent, his deep knowledge of the characteristics of fortress constructions, and his artistic imagination.

== Architectural features ==
The Nardaran Fortress consists of fortress walls enclosing a square-shaped courtyard and a cylindrical tower situated at the center of the courtyard. The walls surrounding the courtyard are 6 meters high and are reinforced by bastioned towers on all four sides. The central tower in the courtyard has a height of 12.5 meters. Local stone was used in the construction of the fortress.

The cylindrical shape, division into three tiers topped with stone domes, the second tier's elevated entrance, and other features make the central tower of the Nardaran Fortress similar to the central tower of the Round Mardakan Fortress. Despite these similarities, the donjon of the Nardaran Fortress also has distinctive characteristics: for example, unlike other Absheron fortresses, the walls of the Nardaran donjon do not incline inward as they rise but maintain their straight form. Additionally, unlike the corbels of the Round Mardakan Fortress donjon, the donjon of the Nardaran Fortress is built from plain hewn stones without decorative elements.

== See also ==
- Round Mardakan Fortress
- Architecture of Azerbaijan

== Literature ==
- Ашурбейли, С. Б. (1992). История города Баку. Период средневековья. Баку: Азернешр. p. 408. ISBN 5-552-00479-5.
- Бретаницкий, Л. С. (1970). Баку. Ленинград-Москва: Искусство. p. 245.
- Мамед-заде, К. М. (1983). Строительное искусство Азербайджана (с древнейших времён до XIX века) / Научный редактор aкадемик АН Азерб. ССР А. В. Саламзаде. Баку: Элм.
- Щеблыкин, И. П. (1943). Памятники азербайджанского зодчества эпохи Низами (материалы) / Под ред. И. Джафарзаде. Баку: Издательство АзФАН.
- Мамиконов, Л. Г. (1946). К изучению средневековых оборонительных сооружений Апшерона. Москва-Баку: Государственное Архитектурное Издательство.
