= Molla Ahmad Mosque =

Former mosque in Baku, Azerbaijan

- Azerbaijani: Molla Əhməd Məscidi
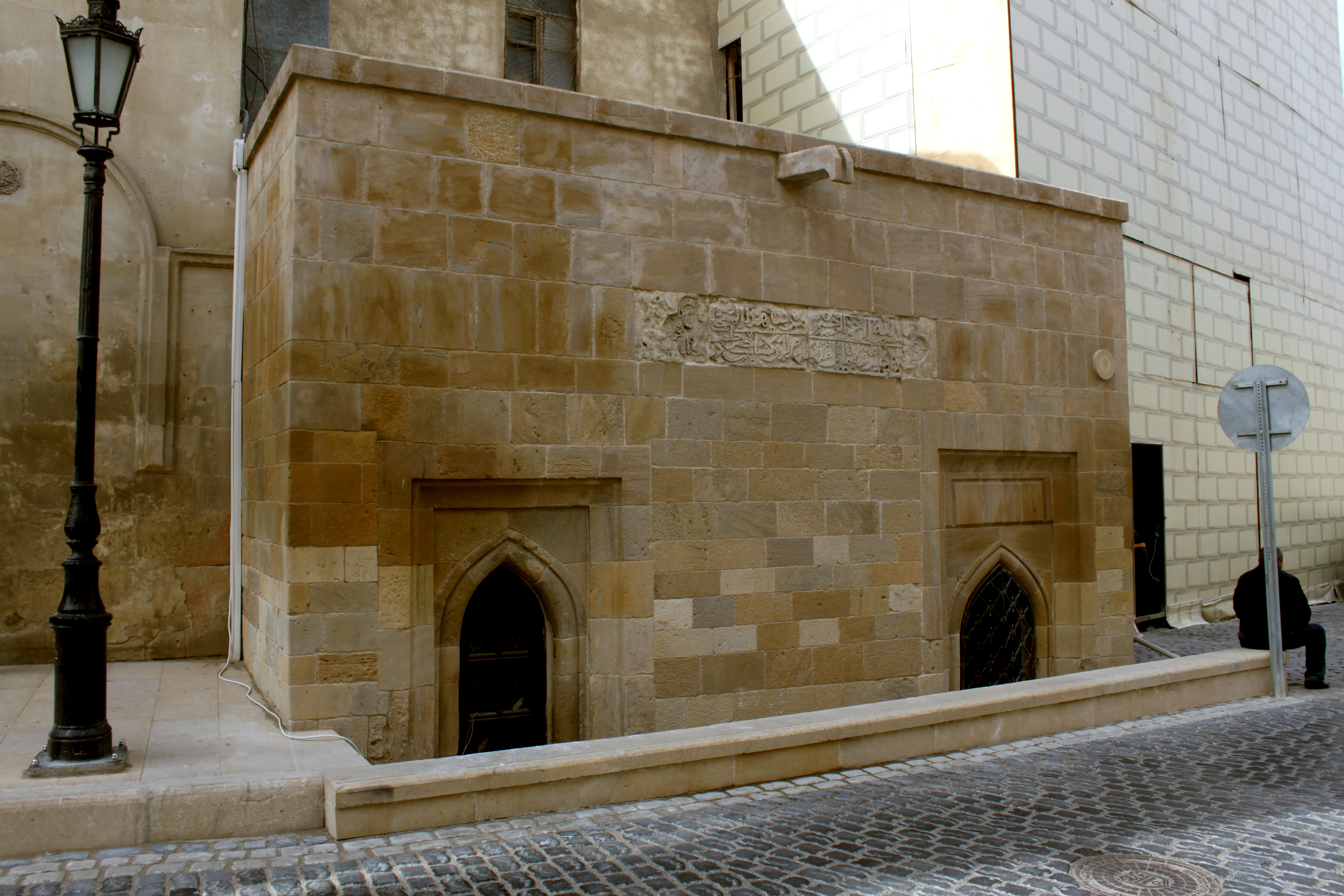
- The former mosque in 2014

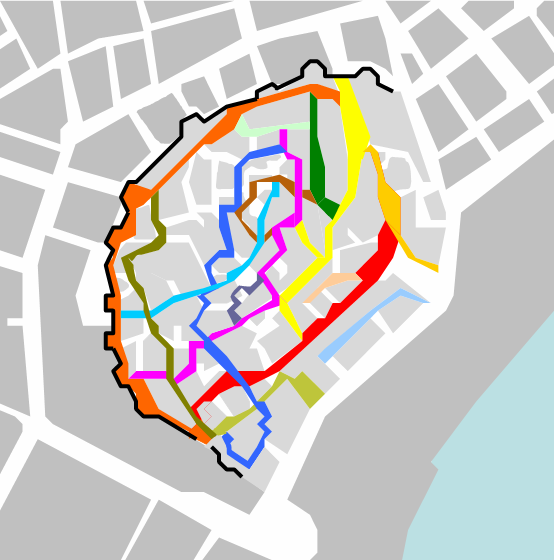
- Location of the former mosque in the Baku Old City

Religion
- Affiliation: Islam (former)
- Ecclesiastical or organisational status: Mosque (former)
- Status: Closed (as a mosque); Restored

Location
- Location: Sabir Street, Old City, Baku
- Country: Azerbaijan
- Coordinates: 40°22′04″N 49°50′08″E

Architecture
- Architect: Mahmud ibn Sa'd
- Type: Mosque architecture
- Style: Islamic; Shirvan-Absheron
- Founder: Nasraddin Gushtаsi ibn Hasan Hаjibаbа
- Completed: 1300 CE
- Inscriptions: One

The Molla Ahmad Mosque (Azerbaijani: Molla Əhməd Məscidi,), also known as the Nasir ad-Din Gashtasib Mosque (Azerbaijani: Nəsir ad-Din Gəştasib Məscidi,), is a former mosque, located on Sabir street, in the Icherisheher of Baku, the capital of Azerbaijan. Completed in 1300 CE, the former mosque was registered as a national architectural monument by the decision of the Cabinet of Ministers of the Republic of Azerbaijan dated August 2, 2001, No. 132.

== History ==
The monument is in the type of mahallah mosque of the Old City. It was ordered by Nasraddin Gushtаsi ibn Hasan Hаjibаbа and constructed by architect-master, Mahmud ibn Sa'd in the early 14th century, who also built Nardaran Castle (1301) and mosque with minarets in Bibi-Heybat village. The monument was named after Ahmad by residents, who was the akhoond of the mosque.

== Architectural features ==
The mosque is quadrangular. It consists of a single small-sized hall. On the southern wall a simple mihrab, low shaped stone dome with crowns on sides, are installed. Its asymmetrical facade is finished with precisely profiled entrance and two windows, which were added in later period.

On the upper part of the mosque there is an inscription in Arabic. The two-lined writing gives detailed information about construction date of the mosque, its client, and as well as the architect, who took an active role in constructing military, religious and memorial buildings and structures. In his works, influence of Shirvanshahs period is observed.

== Gallery ==
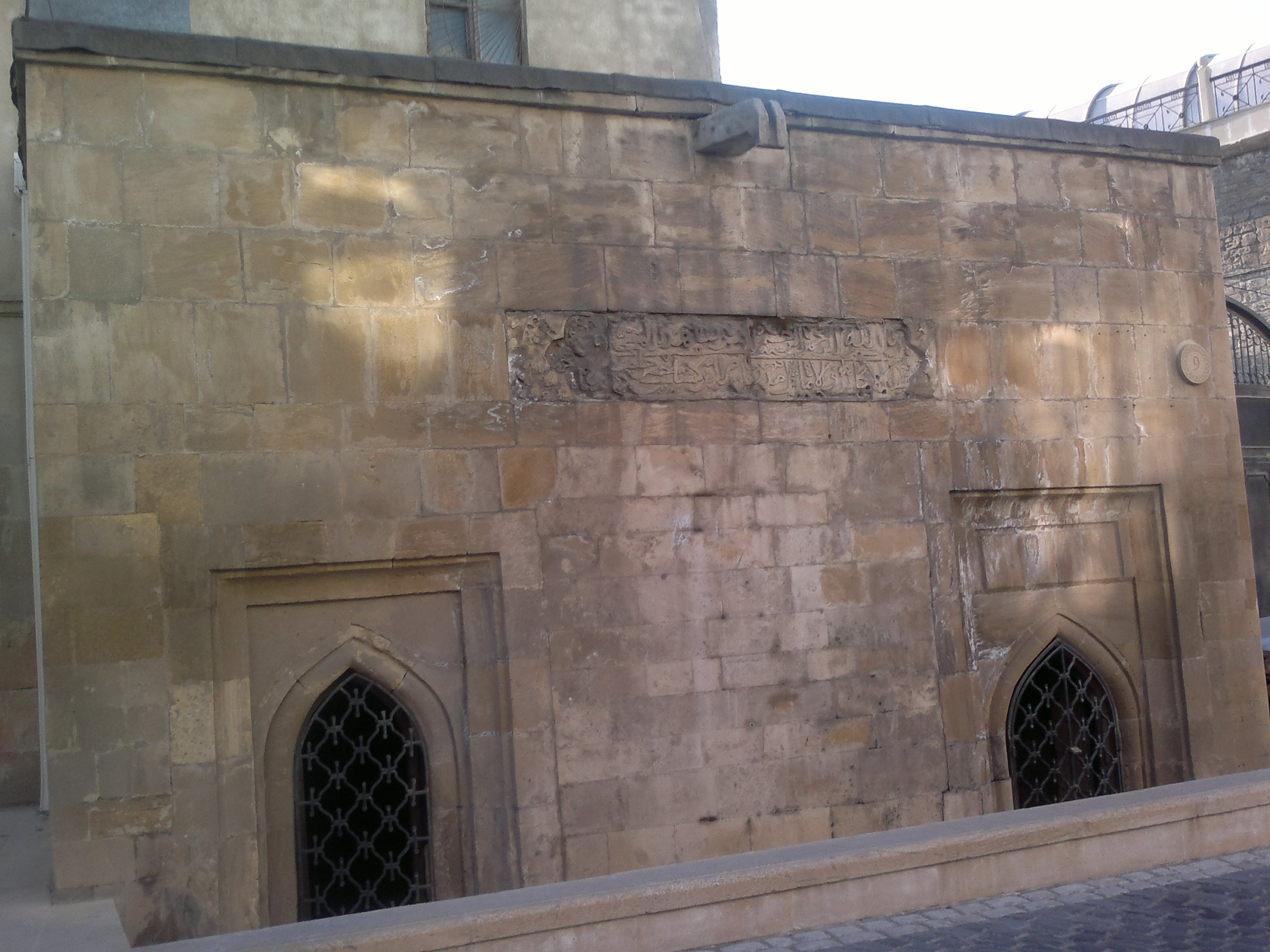

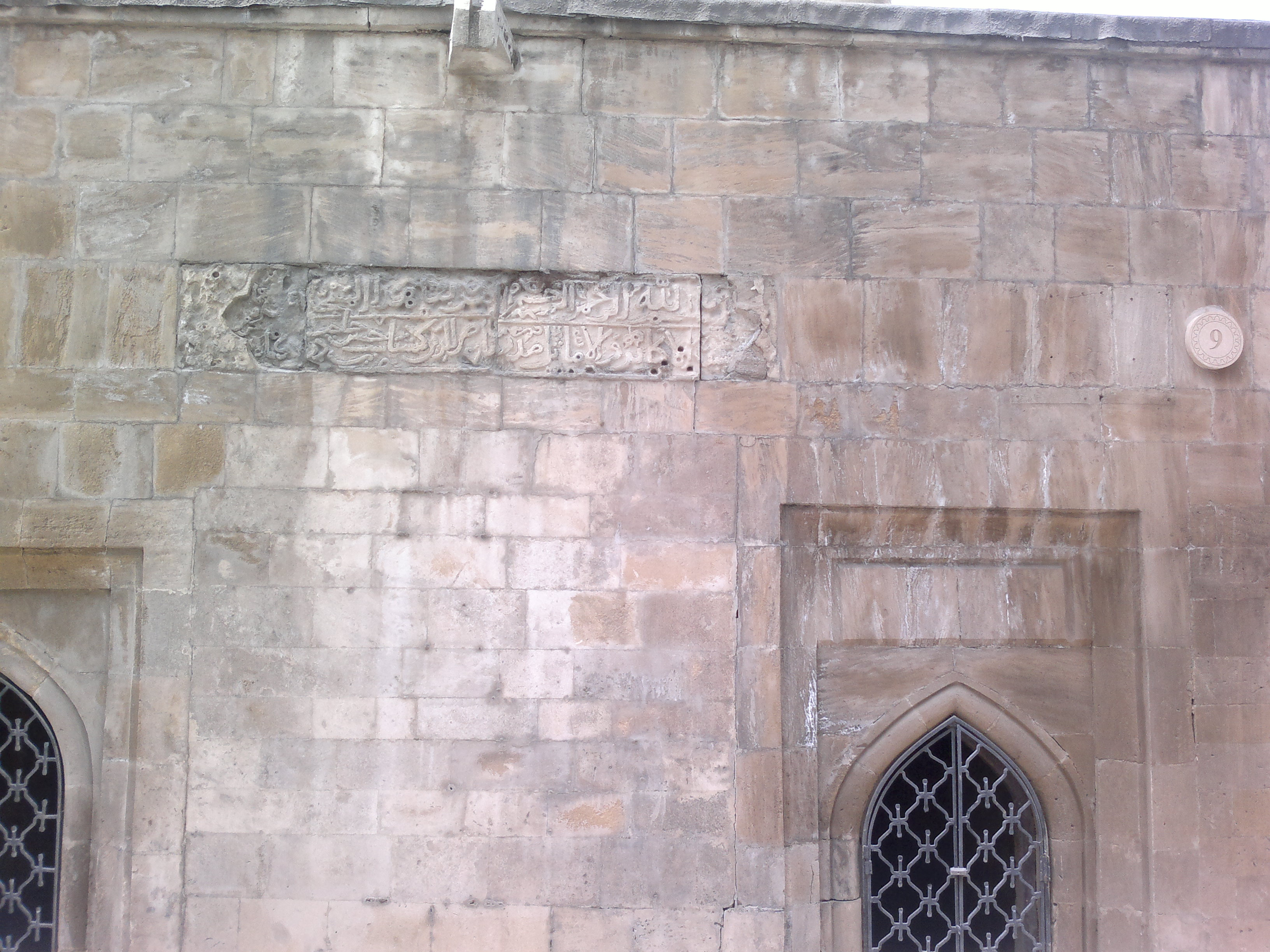

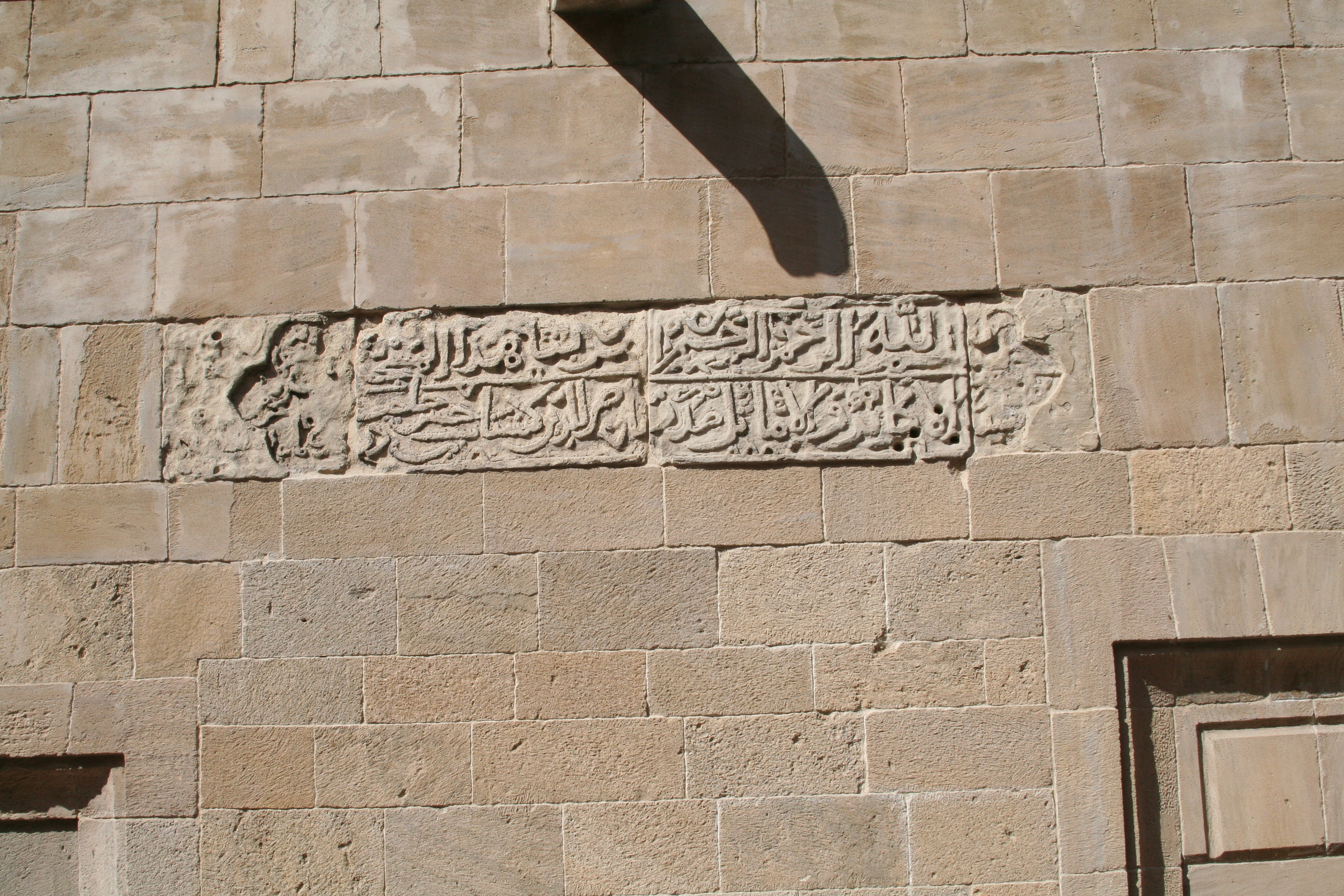

== See also ==
- Islam in Azerbaijan
- List of mosques in Azerbaijan
- List of mosques in Baku
