= Bibi-Heybat Mosque =

Mosque in Baku, Azerbaijan

Coordinates: 40°18′31″N 49°49′13″E

- Azerbaijani: Bibiheybət məscidi Persian: مسجد بی‌بی هیبت
- Exterior from West side after the rebuilt (2026)

- Location of the mosque in Baku

Religion
- Affiliation: Islam
- Ecclesiastical or organisational status: Mosque: (1282–1936); (since 1997)
- Status: Active

Location
- Location: Baku, Absheron, Bibiheybət, Shikhov
- Country: Azerbaijan

Architecture
- Architects: Mahmud ibn Sa'd (1282); Sanan Sultanov (1997)
- Type: Mosque architecture
- Style: Islamic; Shirvan style
- Completed: 1282 (first mosque); 1997 (current mosque)
- Destroyed: 1936 (by Bolsheviks)

Specifications
- Dome: Three
- Minaret: Two

The Bibi-Heybat Mosque (Azerbaijani: Bibiheybət məscidi, Persian: مسجد بی‌بی هیبت) is located in the village of Bibiheybət, near Baku, Azerbaijan. The current structure, completed in the 1990s, replicates the original 13th-century mosque built at the behest of Iranian Shirvanshah Farrukhzad II Ibn Ahsitan II. The historic mosque was completely destroyed by the Bolsheviks in 1936. It is occasionally called "the Mosque of Fatima", which is how Alexandre Dumas referred to it during his visit in the 1850s. The mosque a holy site in Shia Islam.

== History ==
The mosque was built over the tomb of the daughter of the seventh Shiite Imam - Musa al-Kadhim, who fled to Baku from persecution of Abbasid caliphs.

An inscription carved in stone on the tomb indicates that Ukeyma Khanum belonged to the sacred family: "Here was buried Ukeyma Khanum, a descendant of the Prophet Muhammad, the granddaughter of the sixth Imam Ja'far al-Sadiq, the daughter of the Seventh Imam Musa al-Kadhim, sister of the eighth Imam Ali al-Ridha".

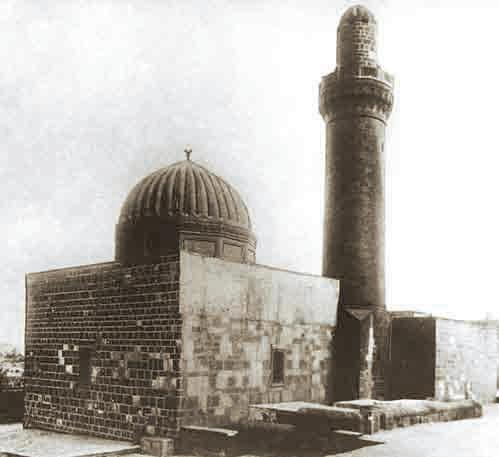
View of the old mosque before renovation in 1911

Based on the inscriptions on the south wall of the mosque, historians attribute its construction to the late 13th century. Arabic inscription on the mosque wall reads: "The work Mahmud ibn Sa'd", which is the same architect who built the Nardaran Fortress near Baku.

Haji Sheikh Sharif was among many Muslims who is buried near the mosque. He arrived in Baku to spread Sufism, and spent the rest of his life in this mosque.

The renowned French writer Alexandre Dumas, who visited the region in 1858-1859, wrote about the mosque in his book Voyage to the Caucasus: “This mosque is a place of pilgrimage for barren women who come there on foot, spend nine days in prayer, and return home confident that they will bear a child within the year”. According to the writer, the poetess Khurshidbanu Natavan (whom Dumas refers to as Princess Khazar Utsmiyeva) made a pilgrimage to the mosque, and after she gave birth to a son, her husband, Khasay Khan Utsmiyev, built a road from the mosque to Baku as an expression of his gratitude.

References to the mosque also appear in the writings of various local and European explorers and travelers, including Abbasgulu Bakikhanov, Ilya Berezin, Johannes Albrecht Bernhard Dorn, Nicholas Khanykov and Yevgeni Pakhomov.

In 1911, a new mosque building was constructed to the north of the tomb, funded by the Baku benefactor Alasgar Agha Dadashov and designed by architect Haji Najaf. The tomb and the original mosque underwent restoration.

=== Demolition of the mosque ===
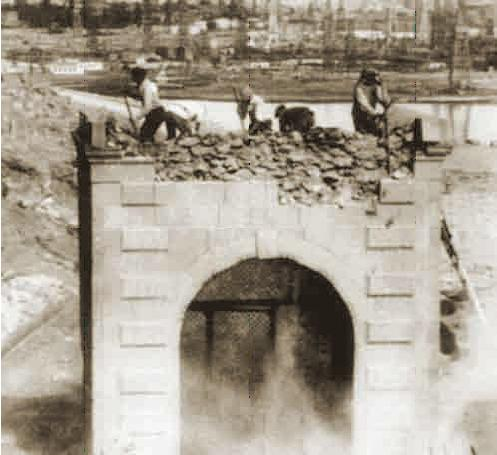
The destruction of the mosque by the Bolsheviks in 1936

After the establishment of Soviet power in Azerbaijan in 1920, the Bolsheviks initiated an anti-religious campaign. Religious structures of various denominations across the country became targets of the new regime's anti-religious policies. Among them were Baku’s Bibi-Heybat Mosque, the Russian Orthodox Alexander Nevsky Cathedral, and the Roman Catholic Church of the Immaculate Conception. As part of this campaign, the historic Bibi-Heybat Mosque was demolished in 1936.

It was only after the destruction of the mosque that, later in the same year, the Soviet government in Moscow adopted a resolution on the preservation of architectural monuments of historical significance. Meanwhile, the chairman of Azerbaijan Committee for the Protection of Monuments of Antiquity, Art, and Nature (Azkomstarsis), Salamov, was sentenced to twenty years of exile in Siberia for his role in the mosque’s demolition.

=== Reconstruction of the mosque ===
After Azerbaijan gained independence in 1991, then-President Heydar Aliyev ordered the construction of a new building for the Bibi-Heybat Mosque in 1994, on the original site where the mosque had been destroyed. The layout and dimensions of the complex were reconstructed using photographs taken shortly before its demolition. Records from various travelers, including an important 1925 article by G. Sadigi describing the mosque’s condition in the mid-1920s, played a crucial role in guiding the mosque’s restoration.

A dedication ceremony, attended by President Heydar Aliyev, was held on July 11, 1997. The new mosque was officially inaugurated in May 1999, and in 2008, monuments to Shirvanshah Farrukhzad and Heydar Aliyev were unveiled.

The mosque was reconstructed and expanded in 2005 by presidential decree. Additional halls were built to ensure greater comfort and convenience for visiting pilgrims.

== Architecture ==
=== Historic mosque ===
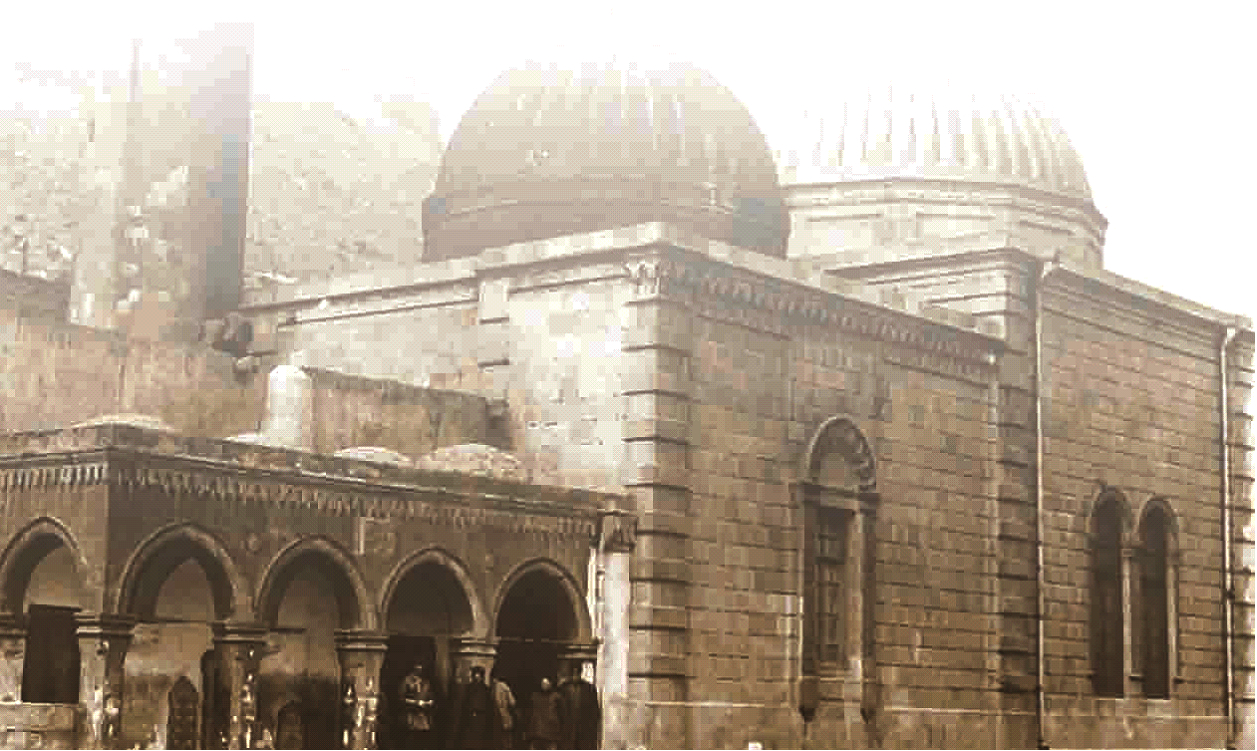
The mosque at the beginning of the 20th century. Left to right: Arcade (behind the minaret is visible), the tomb and new mosque building. The latter two were built in 1911.

The original mosque was located to the south of the tomb, with a minaret positioned on its western side. Subsequently, a crypt and two niches were added to the mosque, situated to the south of the minaret. Inscriptions on the niches bore the name of Fatali Khan, whose tombstone’s marble slab is currently housed in the Azerbaijan State Museum of History.

The minaret of the mosque was constructed between 1305 and 1313 by Mahmud ibn Sa'd. Its upper part was decorated with carvings and stalactites, and was topped with a semicircular ribbed dome. The balcony railings featured an ornate stone lattice. A graphical study showed that the minaret's height was about 22 m (72 ft).

The richly decorated interior of the complex featured intricate ornamental designs. The mosque’s interior consisted of an oblong rectangular prayer hall framed by a lancet arch. Beneath the dome hung a chandelier-candlestick (shamdan), suspended from a hook and encircled by stained glass panels.

On the north side of the minaret and the mosque immediately adjoining the tomb, there was an inscription, which was discovered by Johannes Albrecht Bernhard Dorn. From the inscription, it is clear that the mausoleum was built in 1619 and that Sheikh Sharif Sheikh Bin Abid, who died the day after its completion, was interred there.

=== Reconstructed mosque ===
The modern restored mosque is a classic example of the Shirvan architectural school. It features three domes, which retain the traditional corrugated shape of the original structure, along with two minarets. From the inside, the domes are adorned with green and turquoise mirrors, bordered by gilded inscriptions from the Quran. The men's prayer room is located on the south side of the complex, while the women's prayer room is on the north side. The mausoleum is situated between them.

A local variety of limestone known as Gulbaht was used in the construction of the complex. The frontal sections of the portal are adorned with intricate Khatai ornamentation. The decorative elements of the Bibi-Heybat complex feature ornamental compositions such as Islimi, Shukufa, Bandy-Rumi, Zenjiri Seljuk (Seljuk chain), Shamsi, Jafari, and Achma-Yumma (background-free design). The interior marble walls are embellished with finely carved calligraphic inscriptions executed in various traditional scripts such as Muhaggah, Suls, Jami-Suls, Kufic, Kufi-Shatranj, Musalsag, Divani, Tugra, and others.

The mosque was designed by Azerbaijani architect Sanan Sultanov.

== Gallery ==
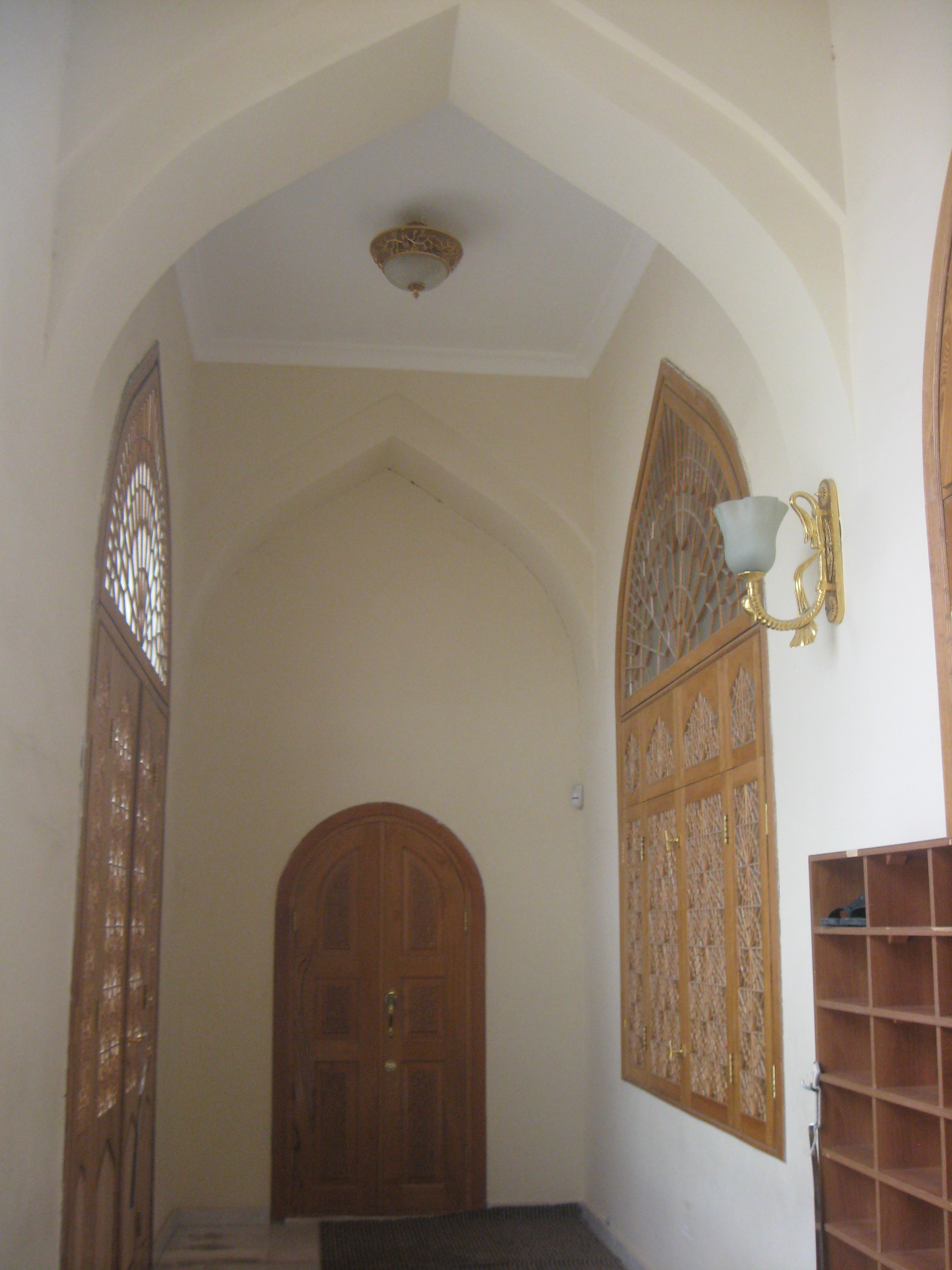
Inside the mosque

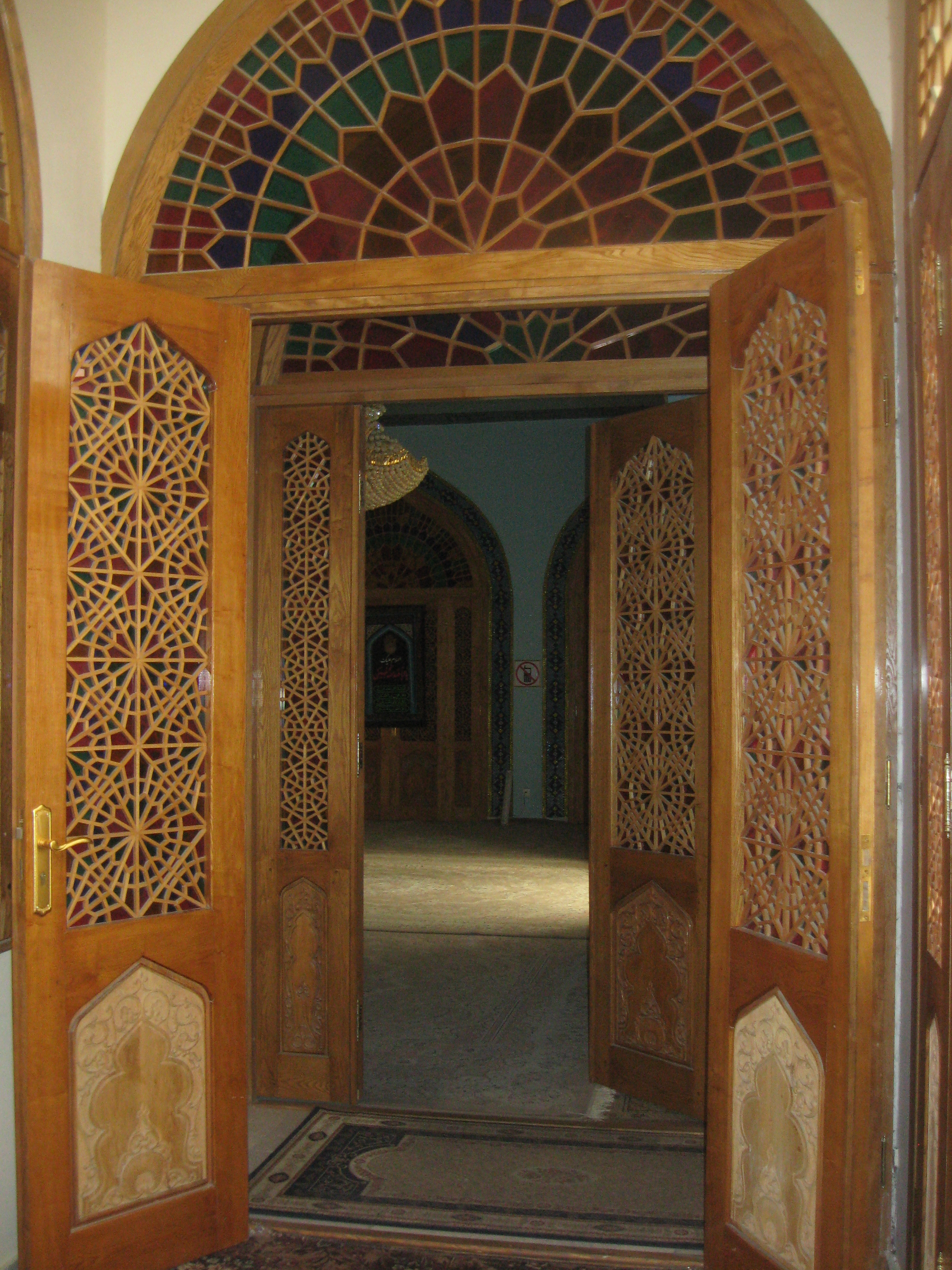
Inside the mosque

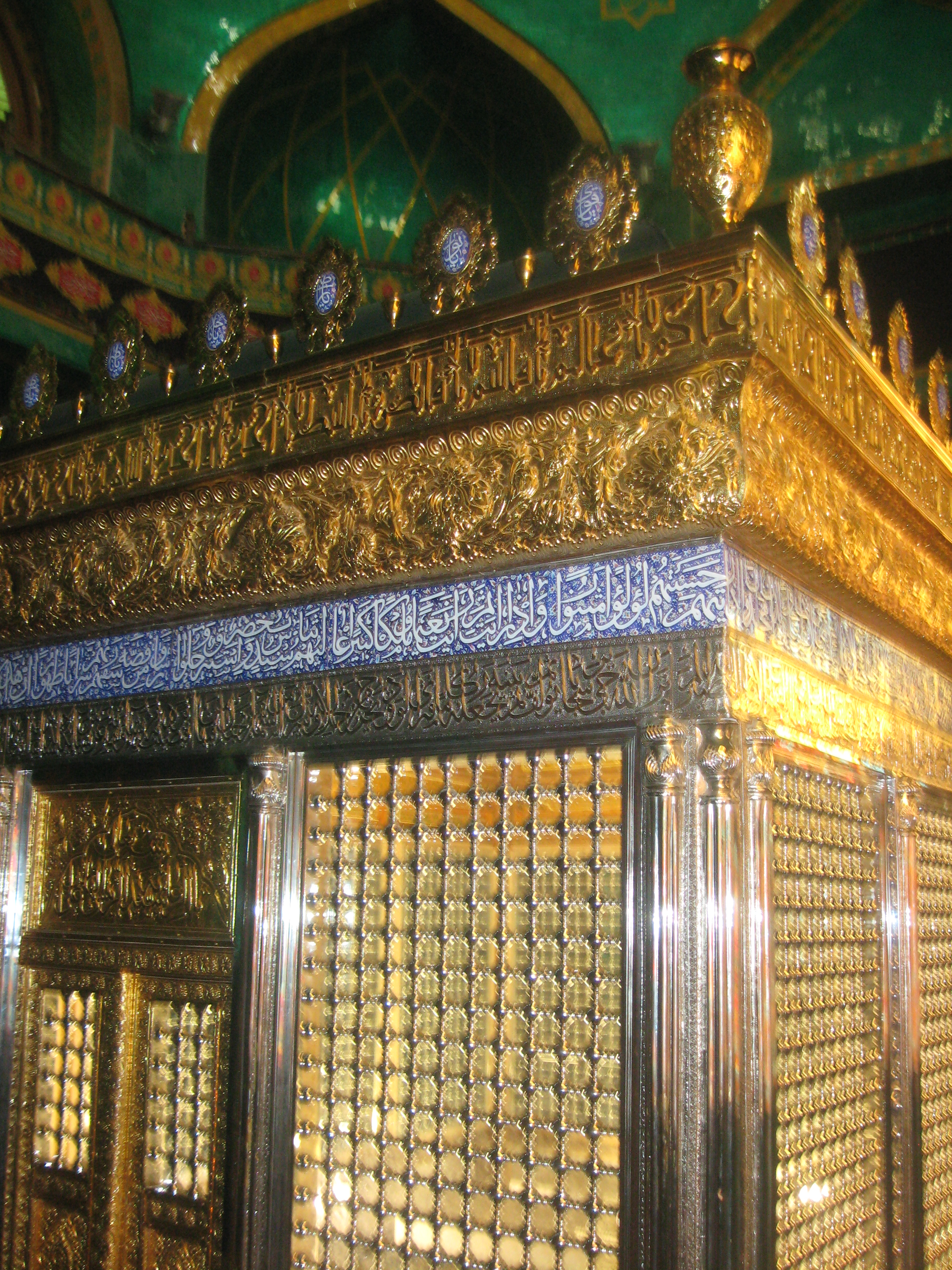
Tombs

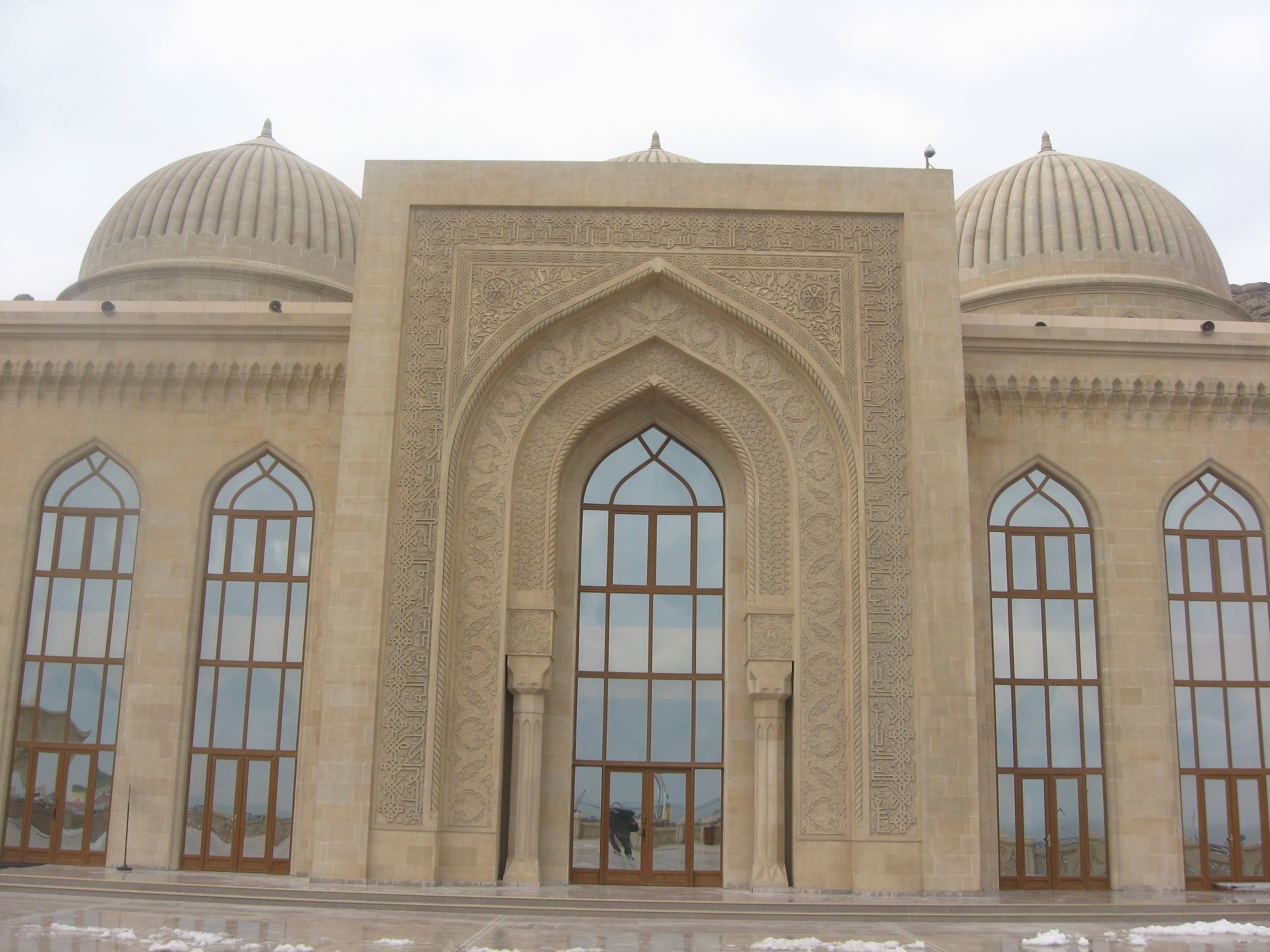
The mosque entrance

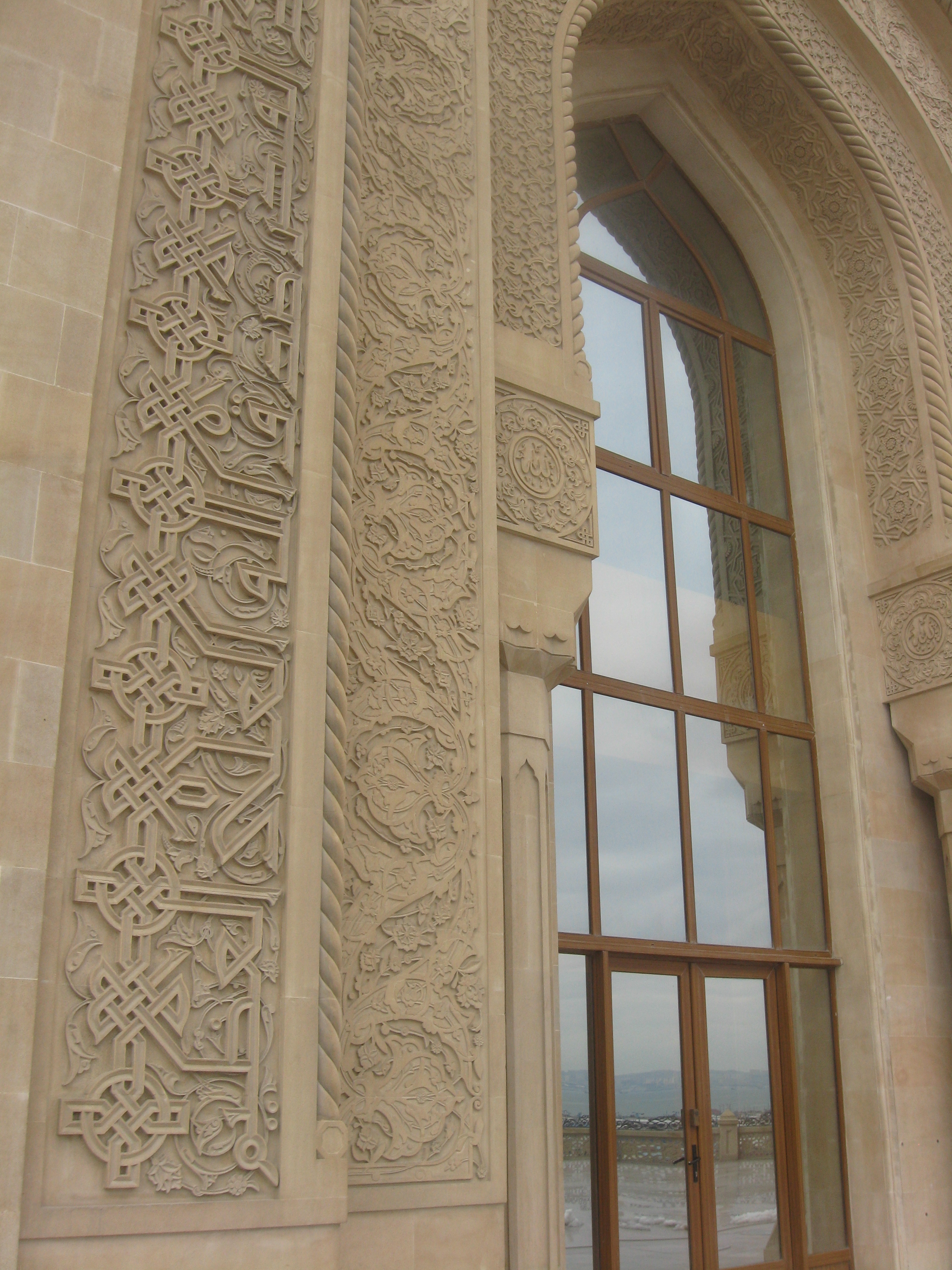
Oriental design

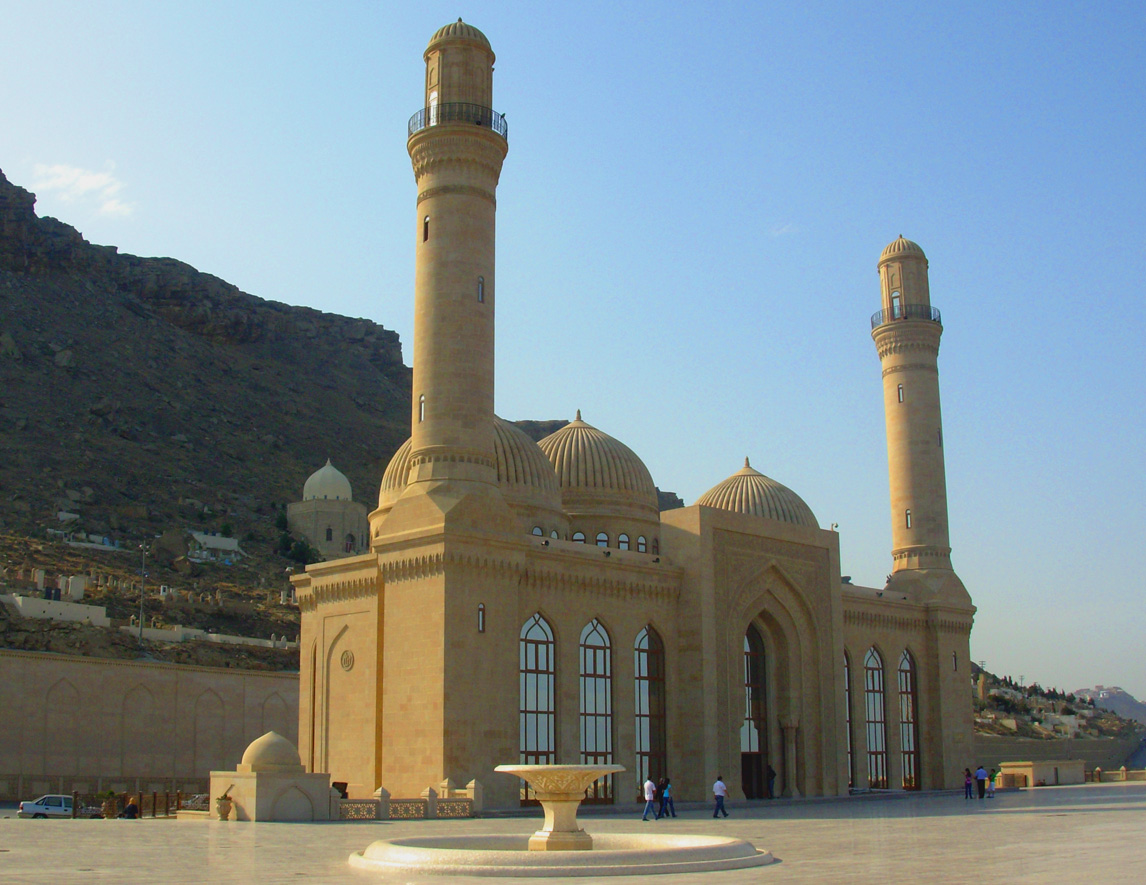
The rebuilt mosque, in 2008

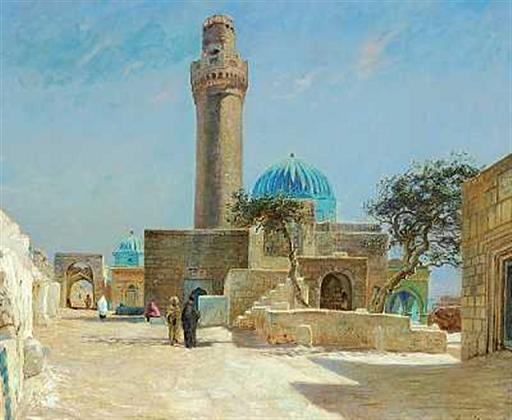
Illustration of mosque by Viggo Peter Olaf Langer

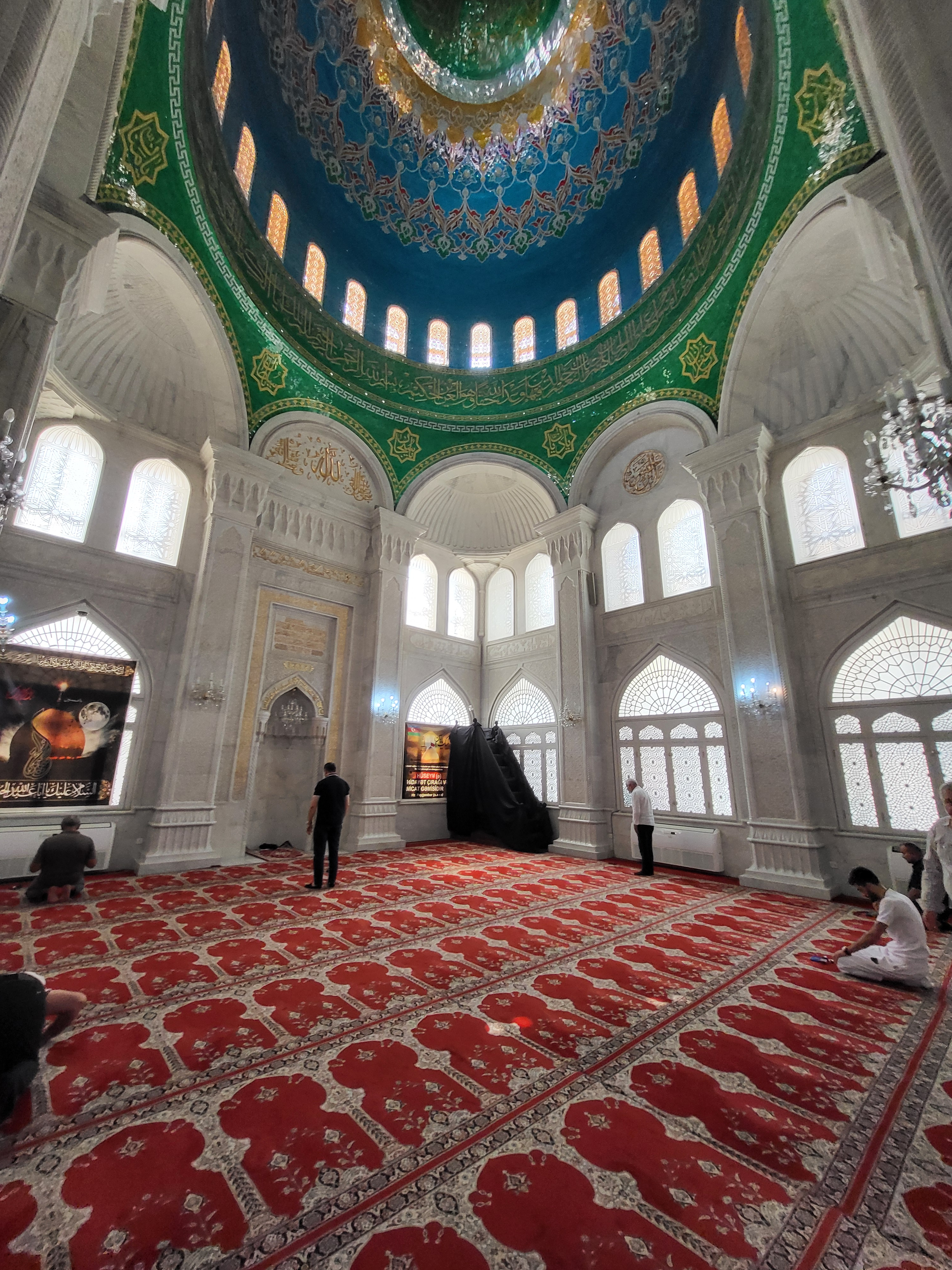
Inside the prayer area

== See also ==
- Islam in Azerbaijan
- List of mosques in Azerbaijan
