= Nardaran Case =

Nardaran case
- Date: 25–26 November 2015 and subsequent trials (2016–2017)
- Location: Nardaran, Baku, Azerbaijan
- Cause: Azerbaijani state operation against members of the Muslim Unity Movement
- Participants: Azerbaijani law enforcement; Muslim Unity Movement members
- Outcome: Long prison sentences; torture allegations; ECHR rulings; US sanctions
- Arrests: 70+ people
- Convicted: 18 defendants (sentenced in January 2017)
- Charges: Terrorism, formation of illegal armed groups, murder, weapons possession

The Nardaran case or Nardaran events (Azerbaijani: Nardaran işi or Nardaran hadisələri) refer to a security operation carried out in the Shia-majority village of Nardaran, Azerbaijan, (in November 2015) and the subsequent arrests and prosecution of members of the Muslim Unity Movement (MUM). Human rights organisations and international observers have criticised these events within the broader context of Azerbaijan’s restrictions on political and religious dissent.

== History ==
=== Background ===
Nardaran is known for conservative Shia traditions and periodic tensions with Azerbaijani authorities, another such region would be Lankaran. Analysts point to local socio-economic restrictions, religious persecution, and long-standing mistrust by the Azerbaijani government towards its independent Shia movements as key elements of the conflict.

The Muslim Unity Movement, founded in 2015 and led by Taleh Bagirzade, presented itself as a non-political religious organization, however the government accused it of extremism and illegal activity.

After a major controversy in which it was revealed that the Azerbaijani government planned to implement a Hijab ban, the Muslim Unity Movement began to stage various protests, of which the Nardaran case was an outgrowth.

=== 2015 operation and arrests ===
On 25–26 November 2015, Azerbaijani security forces launched a major operation in Nardaran. They reported an armed confrontation that resulted in several deaths, including deaths of two police officers, and reportedly seized weapons and explosives.

Following the operation, Nardaran was placed under heavy security restrictions, and more than seventy individuals were arrested with various criminal charges filed against them.

=== Trials and sentencing ===
Detainees, including Bagirzade and senior MUM members, were charged with offences such as terrorism, illegal possession of weapons, murder, and attempting to overthrow the government.

On 25 January 2017, the Baku Serious Crimes Court sentenced 18 people to prison terms ranging from 10 to 20 years.

=== Torture allegations ===
Human rights organisations, including Amnesty International, documented credible allegations that those arrested were tortured or mistreated, reporting incidents of beatings, threats, and coerced confessions. Azerbaijani courts rejected motions to investigate these claims. Similar allegations were also reported by independent journalists in interviews with defendants and their lawyers.

=== International response ===
Several of the detainees filed complaints with the European Court of Human Rights, following which the ECHR issued rulings finding violations related to unlawful detention, unfair trial rights, and lack of effective investigations of torture, and ruled for compensations in several cases.

In 2022, the United States State Department imposed Magnitsky-style sanctions on one of the Azerbaijani police colonels involced in the case - Kerim Alimardanov "for involvement in gross human rights violations, namely, torturing detainees in 2015 and 2016".

=== Context and significance ===
International watchdogs describe Azerbaijan as an authoritarian state with systemic restrictions on freedom of speech, civil rights, and religious freedoms. Freedom House, Human Rights Watch, and Amnesty International describe a pattern whereby Azerbaijani authorities use criminal charges such as extremism, drugs, or weapons possession to silence critics.

The Nardaran case has been cited as an example of this broader pattern, which refers to mass arrests, allegations of torture, and politically motivated charges against a religious community.

=== In culture ===
A variety of Meykhanists such as Vuqar Bileceri and Elsen Xezer came out in support of the protestors, and recited poems about them, which were widely shared on social media and popularized in Azerbaijani Shia circles.

Elsen Xezer in particular was deeply influenced by the event and went on to become a Maddahi, adopting the name "Haci Elsen Xezer" and reciting Shia Islamic poetry in Azerbaijan and Iran.

== See also ==
- Human rights in Azerbaijan
- Tartar case
- Islam in Azerbaijan
