= Mahmud ibn Sa'd =

- Born: Mahmud
- Occupation: architect

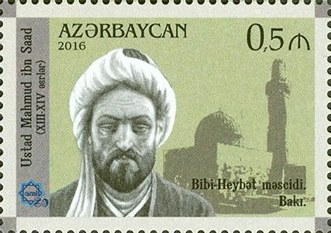
Mahmud ibn Sa'd on an Azerbaijani stamp with the Bibi-Heybat Mosque in the background

Mahmud ibn Sa'd (محمود بن سعد Maḥmūd ibn Saʿd) was an architect who lived in the 13th–14th centuries. Among his works are old Bibi-Heybat Mosque (demolished in 1936), Nardaran Fortress and Molla Ahmad Mosque in Baku's Old City, all three in the modern-day Republic of Azerbaijan.
