= Sea Breeze Walk of Fame =

Walk of Fame in Baku

- Azerbaijani: Sea Breeze Şöhrət xiyabanı
- Established: July 21, 2023
- Location: Sea Breeze Resort, Baku, Azerbaijan
- Type: Entertainment walk of fame
- Director: Emin Agalarov

Sea Breeze Walk of Fame (Azerbaijani: Sea Breeze Şöhrət xiyabanı) located in Nardaran seaside Baku, Azerbaijan, is a Walk of Fame that acknowledges the achievements and accomplishments of successful actos, singers and artists. The project is similar to the Hollywood Walk of Fame, in Los Angeles, United States. The Walk of Fame was inaugurated on July 21, 2023 by Azerbaijani-Russian singer and businessman Emin Agalarov.

== List of honored celebrities ==
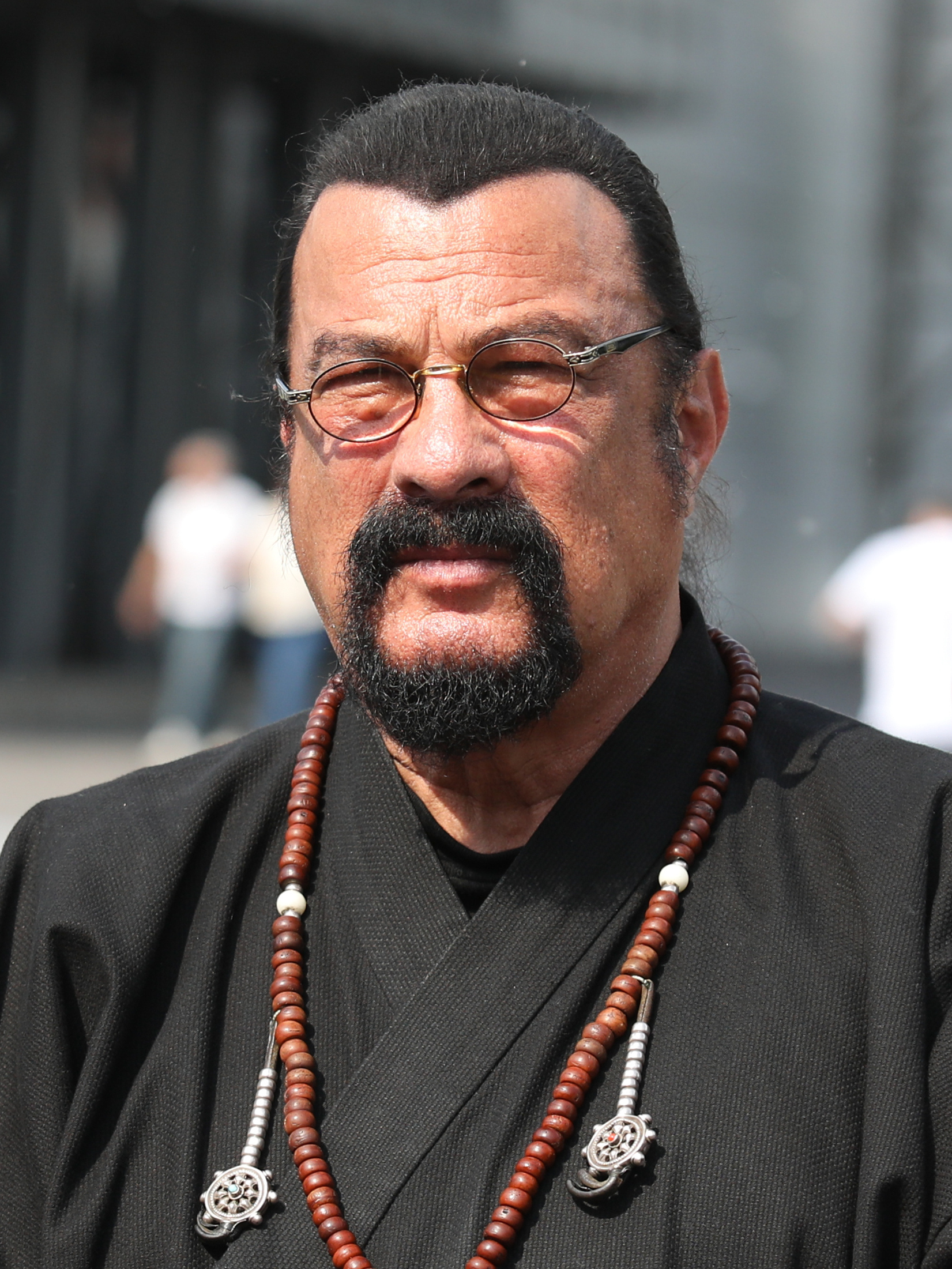
Steven Seagal

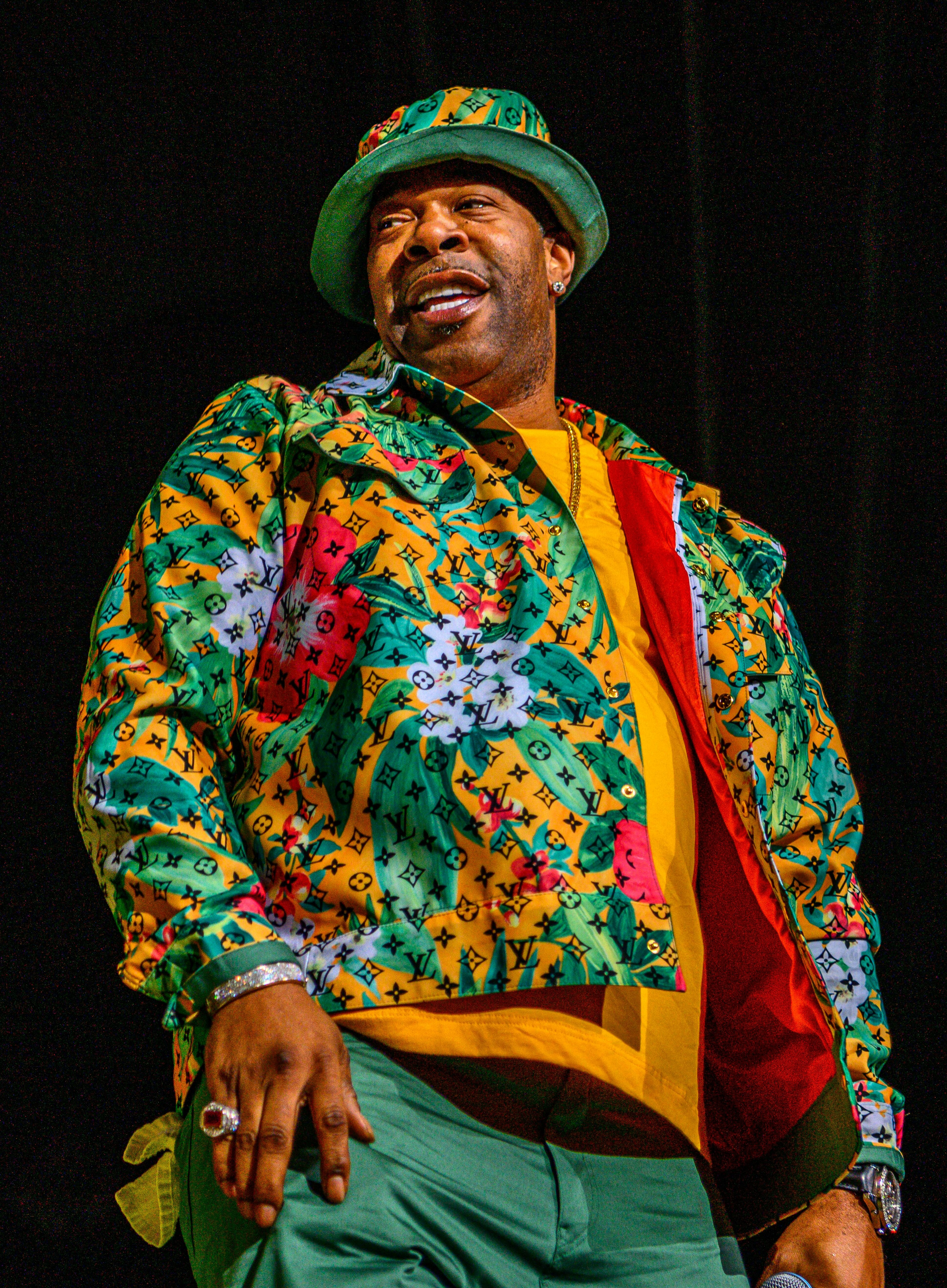
Busta Rhymes

1. Tahir Salahov (b. 1928) – November 29, 1928
2. Magsud Ibrahimbeyov (b. 1935) – May 11, 1935
3. Engelbert Humperdinck (b. 1936) – May 2, 1936
4. Nani Bregvadze (b. 1936) – July 21, 1936
5. Vakhtang Kikabidze (b. 1938) – July 19, 1938
6. Rustam Ibrahimbekov (b. 1939) – February 5, 1939
7. Vagif Mustafazadeh (b. 1940) – March 16, 1940
8. Muslim Magomayev (b. 1942) – August 17, 1942
9. Tamara Sinyavskaya (b. 1943) – July 6, 1943
10. Yuli Gusman (b. 1943) – August 8, 1943
11. Gianni Russo (b. 1943) – December 12, 1943
12. Farrukh Zokirov (b. 1946) – April 16, 1946
13. David Foster (b. 1949) – November 1, 1949
14. Steven Seagal (b. 1952) – April 10, 1952
15. Dr. Alban (b. 1957) – August 26, 1957
16. Khaled (b. 1960) – February 29, 1960
17. Alessandro Safina (b. 1963) – October 14, 1963
18. Thomas Anders (b. 1963) – March 1, 1963
19. C. C. Catch (b. 1964) – August 26, 1964
20. Haddaway (b. 1965) – January 9, 1965
21. Rafet El Roman (b. 1968) – August 25, 1968
22. Will Smith (b. 1968) – September 25, 1968
23. Emre Altuğ (b. 1970) – April 14, 1970
24. Anar Mammadkhanov (b. 1970) – July 20, 1970
25. Ricky Martin (b. 1971) – December 24, 1971
26. Busta Rhymes (b. 1972) – May 20, 1972
27. Nicole Scherzinger (b. 1978) – June 29, 1978
28. In-Grid (b. 1978) – September 11, 1978
29. Craig David (b. 1981) – May 5, 1981
30. Ty Dolla Sign (b. 1982) – April 13, 1982
31. Jack Savoretti (b. 1983) – October 10, 1983
32. Katharine McPhee (b. 1984) – March 25, 1984
33. J Balvin (b. 1985) – May 7, 1985
34. John Newman (b. 1990) – June 16, 1990
35. Edis (b. 1990) – November 28, 1990
36. Mahmut Orhan (b. 1993) – January 11, 1993
37. Zeynep Bastık (b. 1993) – July 8, 1993

== List of honored bands ==
1. Enigma
2. Kosheen
3. OneRepublic
4. Secret Service
5. The Jackson 5

== See also ==
- List of halls and walks of fame
