= Islam in Azerbaijan =

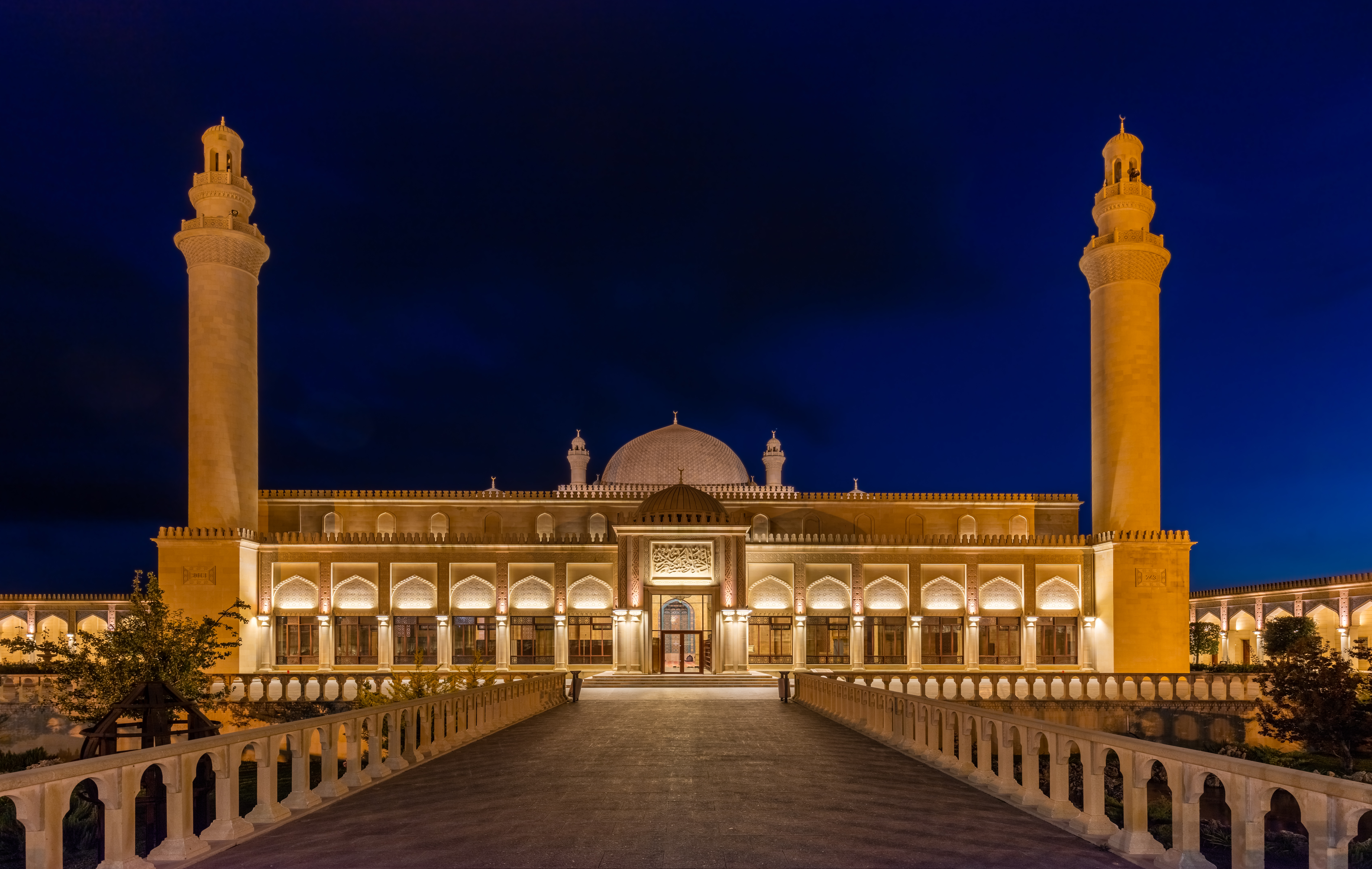
The Juma Mosque of Shamakhi in Shamakhi, Azerbaijan

Islam in Europe by percentage of country population 95–100%: Azerbaijan; 90–95%: Turkey; Kosovo; 50–70%: Albania; Bosnia and Herzegovina; Kazakhstan; 30–35%: North Macedonia; 10–20%: France; Sweden; Georgia; Montenegro; 5–10%: Austria; Belgium; Bulgaria; Denmark; Germany; Liechtenstein; Luxembourg; Netherlands; Russia; Switzerland; United Kingdom; Spain; Greece; 4–5%: Serbia; 2–4%: Italy; Finland; Norway; Malta; Slovenia; Cyprus (Note: Only takes into account the Muslim population residing on land controlled by the Republic of Cyprus.); 1–2%: Croatia; Ireland; Ukraine; Andorra; < 1%: Iceland; Armenia; Belarus; Czech Republic; Estonia; Hungary; Latvia; Lithuania; Moldova; Monaco; Poland; Portugal; Romania; San Marino; Slovakia

Islam in Azerbaijan
Islam	Percent

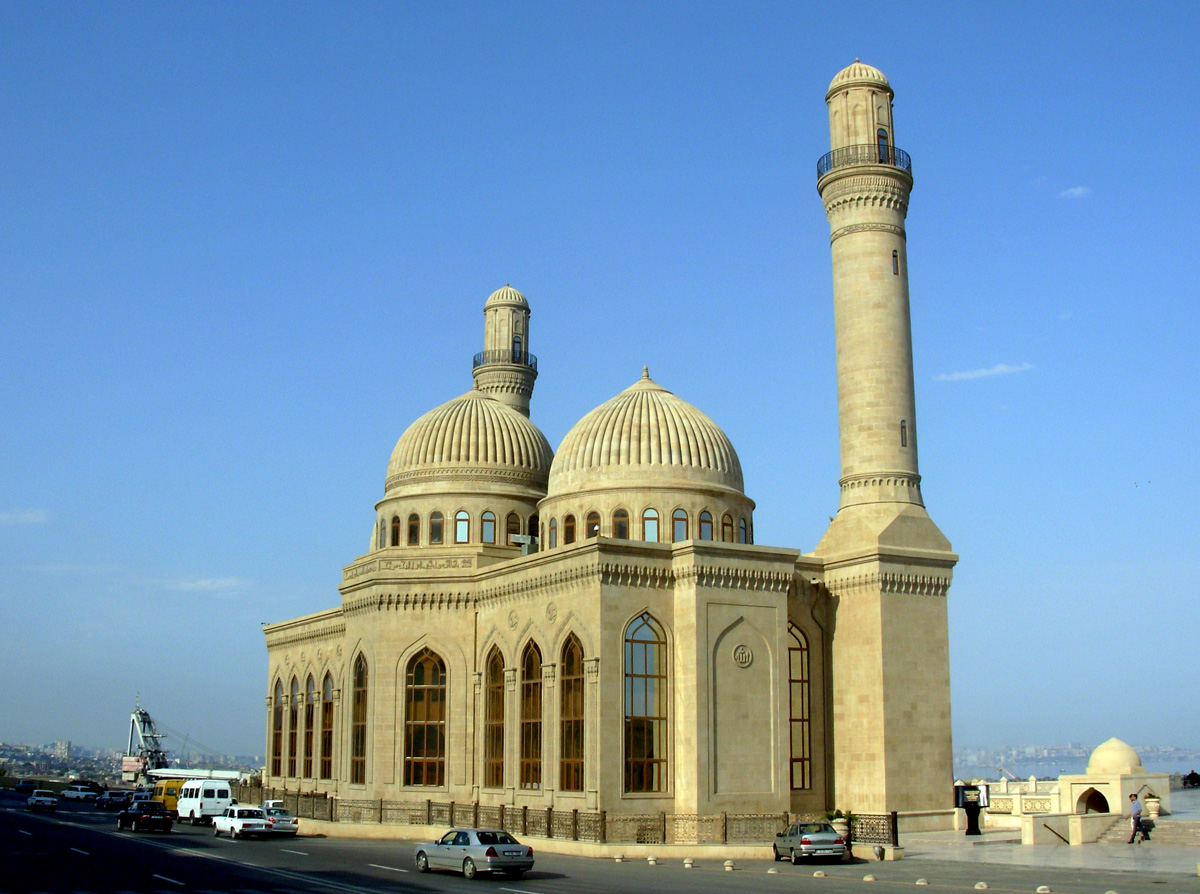
The Bibi-Heybat Mosque in Baku, Azerbaijan

Islam is the majority religion in Azerbaijan, but the country is considered to be the most secular in the Muslim world. Various reports have estimated that 97.3% (CIA, 2020) or 99.2% (Pew Research Center, 2006) of the population identify as Muslim, with the majority (60-65%) being Shias, 45% for non-denominational Muslims and a significant minority (35-40%) being Sunnis. Traditionally, the differences between these two branches of Islam have not been sharply defined in Azerbaijan, as a major portion of the population are cultural Muslims.

Most Shia Muslims in the country follow the Ja'fari school of Shia Islam, while Sunni Muslims typically adhere to either the Hanafi or Shafi'i school. Due to many decades of Soviet atheist policy, religious affiliation in Azerbaijan is often nominal, and Muslim identity tends to be based more on culture and ethnicity than on religion. Shia Islam is prevalent in the western, central, and southern regions of the country. Traditionally, villages around Baku and the Lankaran region are considered Shia strongholds. In contrast, Sunni Islam is dominant in the northern regions.

== History ==
Islam arrived in Azerbaijan with Arabs in the seventh century, gradually supplanting Christianity and pagan cults.

In the sixteenth century, the first shah of the Safavid Dynasty, Ismail I (r. 1501-1524), established Shi'a Islam as the state religion, although a portion of people remained Sunni. The population of what is nowadays Iran and what is nowadays Azerbaijan were converted to Shia Islam at the same moment in history.

As elsewhere in the Muslim world, the two branches of Islam came into conflict in Azerbaijan. Enforcement of Shi'a Islam as the state religion brought contention between the Safavid rulers and the ruling Sunnis of the neighboring Ottoman Empire.

In the nineteenth century, many Sunni Muslims emigrated from Russian-controlled Azerbaijan because of Russia's series of wars with their coreligionists in the Ottoman Empire. Thus, by the late nineteenth century, the Shi'a population was in the majority in Russian Azerbaijan. Antagonism between the Sunnis and the Shi'a diminished in the late nineteenth century as Azerbaijani nationalism began to emphasize a common Turkic heritage and opposition to Iranian religious influences.

=== Russian Empire and Soviet Union ===
In 1806, Azerbaijan became occupied by the Russian Empire as the latter invaded Qajar Iran during the Russo-Persian War (1804–1813). In the aftermath, Iran was forced to cede therefore almost all of Azerbaijan according to the Treaty of Gulistan of 1813 to Russia. However, all this only came to be confirmed in the aftermath of the next and last war between Russia and Iran, the Russo-Persian War (1826–1828) and the resulting Treaty of Turkmenchay of 1828. In 1918, Azerbaijan declared independence from Russia and established the Azerbaijan Democratic Republic under its leading Musavat party, but was incorporated into the Soviet Union in 1920.

Before Soviet power was established, about 2,000 mosques were active in Azerbaijan. Most mosques were closed in the 1930s, then some were allowed to reopen during World War II. The Soviet rule promoted an Azerbaijani national consciousness as a substitute for identification with the world Islamic community and Iran.

During World War II, Soviet authorities established the Muslim Spiritual Board of Transcaucasia in Baku as the governing body of Islam in the Caucasus, in effect reviving the nineteenth-century tsarist Muslim Ecclesiastical Board. During the tenures of Leonid Brezhnev and Mikhail Gorbachev, Moscow encouraged Muslim religious leaders in Azerbaijan to visit and host foreign Muslim leaders, with the goal of advertising the freedom of religion and superior living conditions reportedly enjoyed by Muslims under Soviet communism.

During the Azerbaijani SSR, there were 17 mosques functioning in the country. In the 1980s only two large and five smaller mosques held services in Baku, and only eleven others were operating in the rest of the country. Supplementing the officially sanctioned mosques were thousands of private houses of prayer and many secret Islamic sects.

The lone center of conservative Shia Islam, was the town of Nardaran, 25 kilometers northeast of central Baku, and was renowned for its thirteenth-century Shia shrine. Unlike the rest of the country which was staunchly secular and which can be considered religiously progressive, Nardaran was the only place in the whole of Azerbaijan where its inhabitants are devoutly religious and fundamentalist, where its streets display religious banners and where most women wear chadors in public. The now banned Islamic Party of Azerbaijan was founded in this town and its base was centered there.

There is some evidence of Sufism in Azerbaijan.

=== After the Soviet Union ===
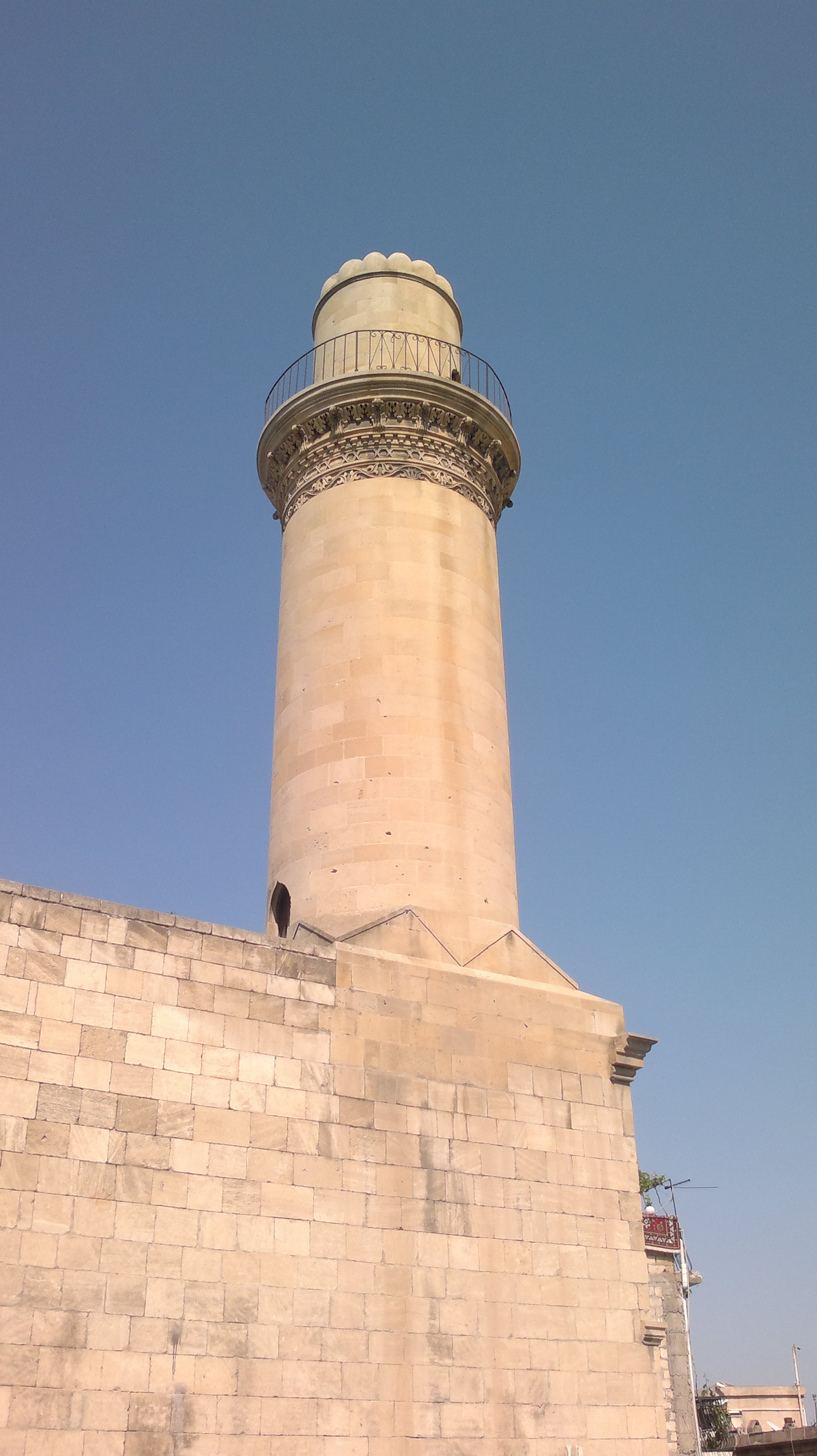
A Mosque in Baku

A stone-age cave converted into a Mosque in Gobustan, Azerbaijan

Beginning in the late Gorbachev period, and especially after independence, the number of mosques rose dramatically. Many were built with the support of other Islamic countries, such as Iran, Oman, and Saudi Arabia, which also contributed Qur'ans and religious instructors to the new Muslim states. A Muslim seminary has also been established since 1991. The growing number of religious Muslims resulted in the establishment of more than 2,000 mosques by 2014.

After independence, the laws regarding religion are quite clear. In Article 7 of the constitution, Azerbaijan is declared a secular state. This point is driven home in Article 19 with the statement of the separation of religion and state and the equality of all religions before the law as well as the secular character of the state educational system.

Immediately after the independence of Azerbaijan in 1991, Sunni missionaries flocked to the country. The Sunni missionaries were divided among two movements, the Sufis, mostly from Turkey, and the Salafis, mostly from Saudi Arabia or Chechnya. Preachers in Azerbaijan were mostly charismatic locals who studied in Saudi Arabia and received funding from Saudi and other Gulf businessmen. Salafi preachers often used Anti-Iranian sentiment to attract converts. Furthermore, the presence of Chechen Salafi militants also contributed to the rise of Salafism among many Azerbaijani youth in border and urban areas. In addition to the Salafis, Turkish Sufi missionaries from various tarikats also flocked to Azerbaijan, promoting a Turkified version of Islam more compatible with nationalism. After independence, Azerbaijan maintained a strict secular policy. However, Sunni missionaries continued to be active in the country, with the rivalry between the Turkish Sufis and Arab Salafis intensifying gradually.

Although Shia Islam historically dominated Azerbaijan, as most Azerbaijani Turks adhered to Shia Islam, there were some Sunni pockets in Azerbaijan, especially in the northern and western regions, generally associated with ethnic minorities like Lezgins or Avars. The Soviet era eroded both Sunni and Shia religious institutions, but after independence, Sunni institutions were among the first to benefit from foreign support. Sunni Islam, particularly Salafism, grew in certain Azerbaijani urban and peripheral communities which had been traditionally secular before. Similarly, the Turkish Sufis, especially the Gulenists, were able to cultivate a following through educational and charitable networks. Many Azerbaijanis who converted to Sunni Islam did so for a sense of community rather than spiritual belief. Among some Pan-Turkists in Azerbaijan, conversion to Sunni Islam was a way to align with Turkey. It was not only a personal faith decision but also a political assertion, emphasizing closeness to Turkey and distinction from Iran.

The secular government of Azerbaijan officially promoted Turkish-influenced Sufism over both Iranian-influenced Shia Islam and Arab-influenced Salafism, but maintained vigilance over religious activities of any sect. Many Turkish missionaries in Azerbaijan directly worked for the Turkish government religious institutions.

By the early 2020s, the Arab-influenced Salafi movement had declined, and the Turkish-influenced Sufi movement further deepened its activities in Azerbaijan and usage of Pan-Turkism. The Salafi movement had declined and was under extreme government repression, especially after terror attacks in the 2000s by Chechen militants in Azerbaijan. Salafi activity persisted underground but with diminished capacity. The religious conflict became largely between Turkish-influenced Sufis and Iranian-influenced Shias. There was another rise in conversions to Sunni Islam after the 2020 Nagorno-Karabakh war, which was seen as a symbol of growing closeness with Turkey.

While Sunnis in Azerbaijan became a more noticeable minority, many traditional Shia clerics accused Azerbaijani Sunnis of having shamelessly sold their ancestral religion merely for Turkish approval and only symbolically converting without actually believing in it. Many Azerbaijani Shia clerics were pressured into political quietism or pragmatic collaboration with pro-state religious institutions. Many religious Shia Azerbaijanis criticized the rise of Sunni Islam as a betrayal of the historically Shia identity of Azerbaijan and as a means of submission to Turkey after the Ottoman-Safavid conflict which lasted centuries. In 2018, an Azerbaijani Shia cleric stated that they were "trading Karbala for Ankara".

Many secular Azerbaijanis also criticized the Sunni movement, claiming that it would not only increasing religiosity but also create an additional source of division for Azerbaijanis, as most Azerbaijanis were secular with a common Shia background. There was a proverb among secular Azerbaijani nationalists which stated "They pray like Turks to get a job in Istanbul", aimed at being a sarcastic reference towards Azerbaijani Sunnis.

== Religiosity levels ==
Azerbaijan has been a secular country and is often considered the most secularized Muslim-majority nation.

A 1998 survey estimated the proportion of ardent believers in Azerbaijan at close to 7 percent, slightly more than the number of declared atheists — almost 4 percent — with the largest numbers falling into the category of those who consider Islam above all as a way of life, without strict observance of prohibitions and requirements, or as a fundamental part of national identity. Another 1998 poll estimated the proportion of ardent believers in Azerbaijan at only 20 percent.

In a 2010 survey only half of Azerbaijanis answering yes to the question, "Is religion an important part of your daily life?".

Yet in 2017 Dobroslawa Wiktor-Mach noted an Islamic revival in the country: In 2010, the Caucasus Research Resource Center (CRRC)'s "Caucasus Barometer" found out that for around 25% of the citizens religion was "very important" and for 43% "rather important" but just two years later, in 2012, as per the same organization those who considered it "very important" rose to 33% while those who chose "rather important" rose to 47% (16% selecting "less important", 2% not important and 1% not knowing).

== Religious extremism ==
There is a certain rise of religious extremism across Azerbaijan as a result of continued problems such as corruption, poverty, and government rule, combined with disillusionment with the West and support of religious sects from different countries. However it works against a headwind of traditional secularism. According to Svante Cornell:

Azerbaijan can rightly claim to be among the most progressive and secular Islamic societies. Aside from having been the first Muslim country to have operas, theater plays, and a democratic republic, Azerbaijan today is among the Muslim countries where support for secularism is the highest, and where radical ideologies have met only very limited interest.

Svante Cornell believes that the radical groups remain weak, but have a potential to grow under the current domestic and international circumstances. To confront this, the Azerbaijani state needs to address the diarchy in terms of supervision of religious structures. He writes, that the Government policies toward Islam in general and Islamic radicalism in particular have been inadequate.

According to researchers Emil Souleimanov and Maya Ehrmann, there is "a trend among Dagestani minorities in the north of Azerbaijan to engage in insurgent activities". The Salafi movement has been "spurred by missionary activities using external funds and the establishment of mosques", and found support from those who the desire a return to more traditionalist values. As authorities have repressed Salafis in the north they have become more radical.

Citizens of Azerbaijan have joined terrorist organizations in Syria.

In Nardaran, a deadly incident broke out between Azerbaijan security forces and religious Shia residents in which two policemen and four suspected Shia Muslim militants were killed, the events came to be known as the Nardaran case.

As a result of this incident, the Azerbaijani parliament passed laws prohibiting people with religious education received abroad to implement Islamic rites and ceremonies in Azerbaijan, as well as to preach in mosques and occupy leading positions in the country; as well as prohibiting the display of religious paraphernalia, flags and slogans, except in places of worship, religious centers and offices. Ashura commemorations in public have also been banned. The Azerbaijani government also passed a law to remove the citizenship of Azerbaijani citizens who fight abroad.

== See also ==
- The State Committee on Religious Associations of the Republic of Azerbaijan
- 2007 Baku terrorist plot
