= Nardaran =

- Municipality
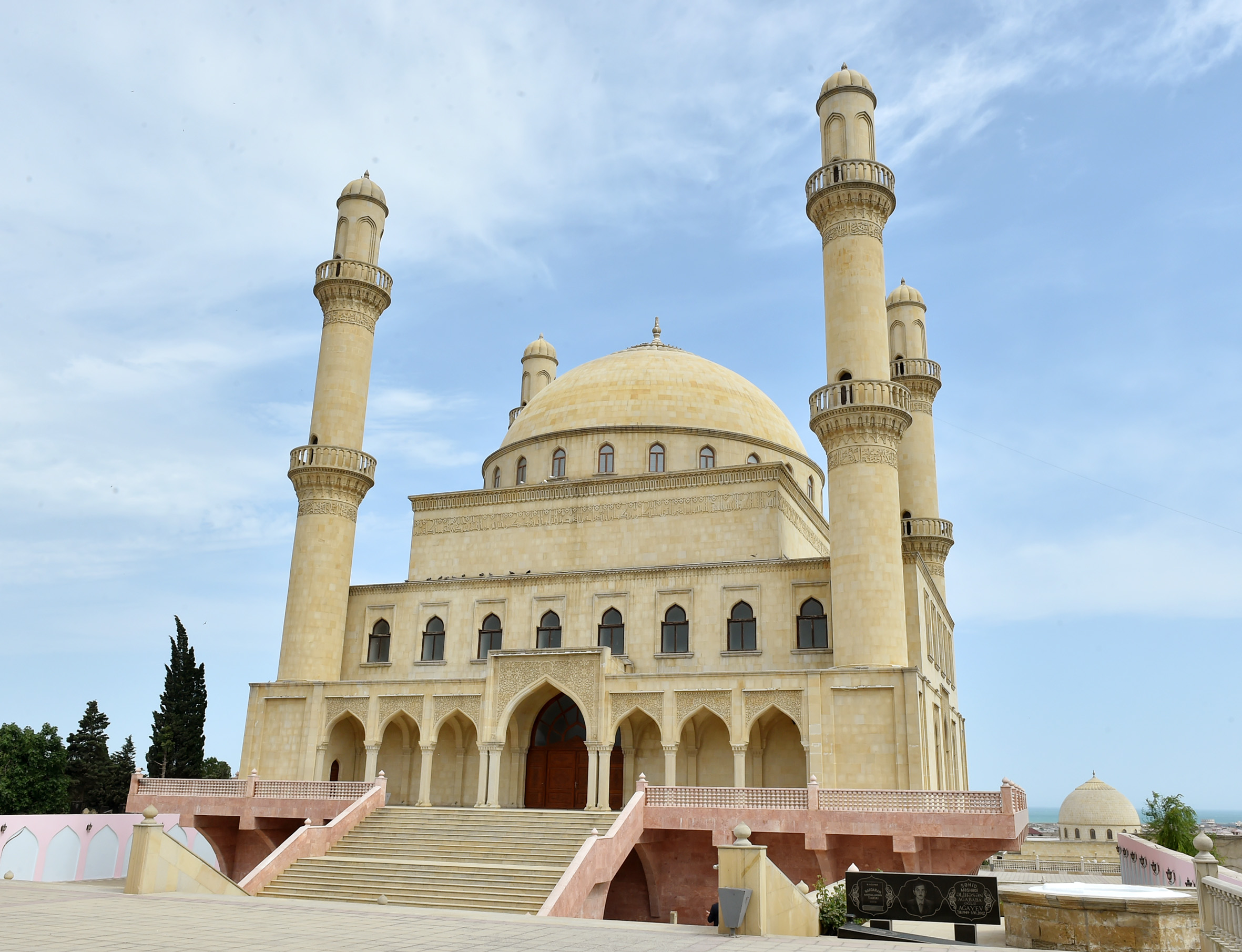
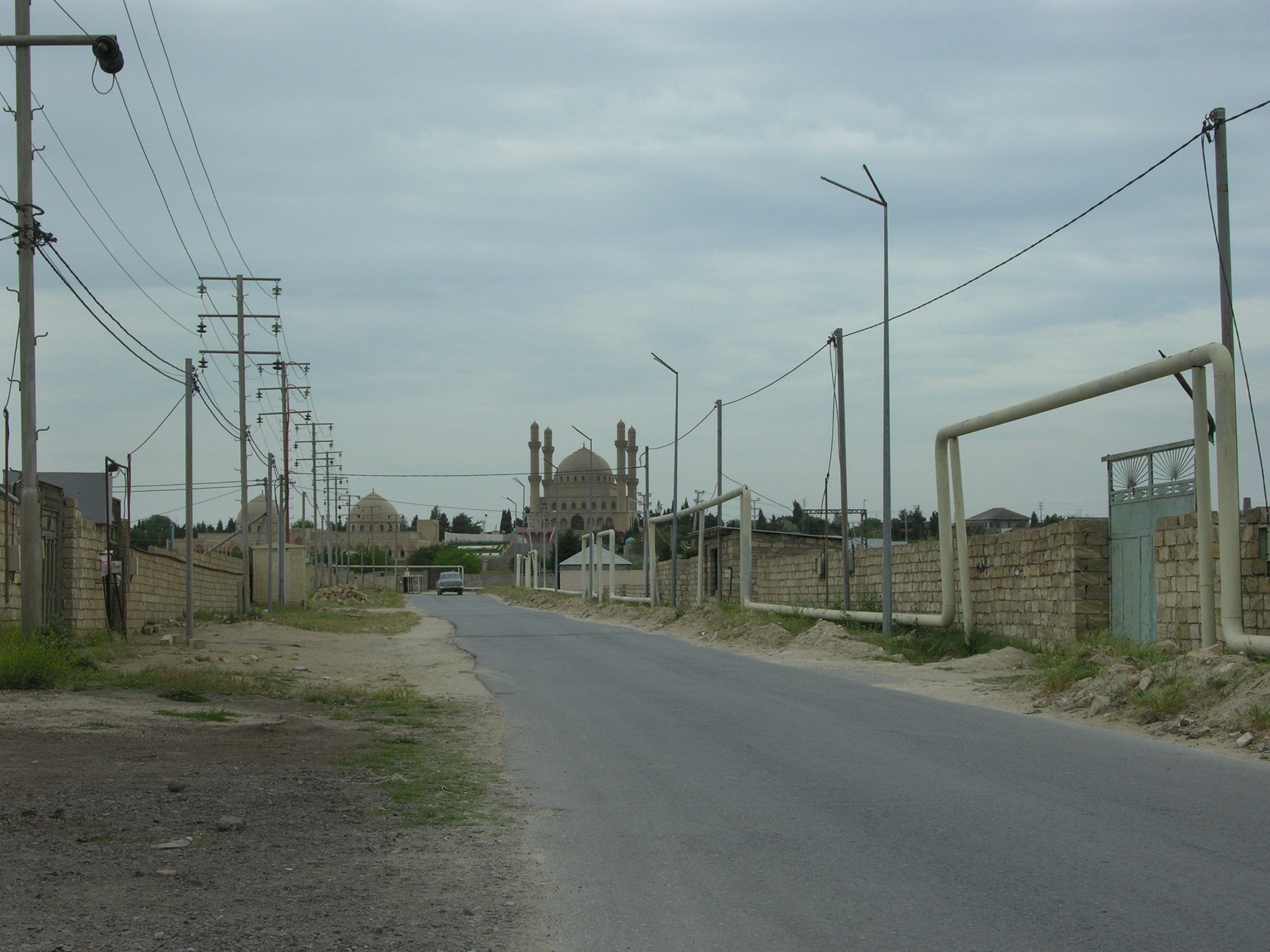
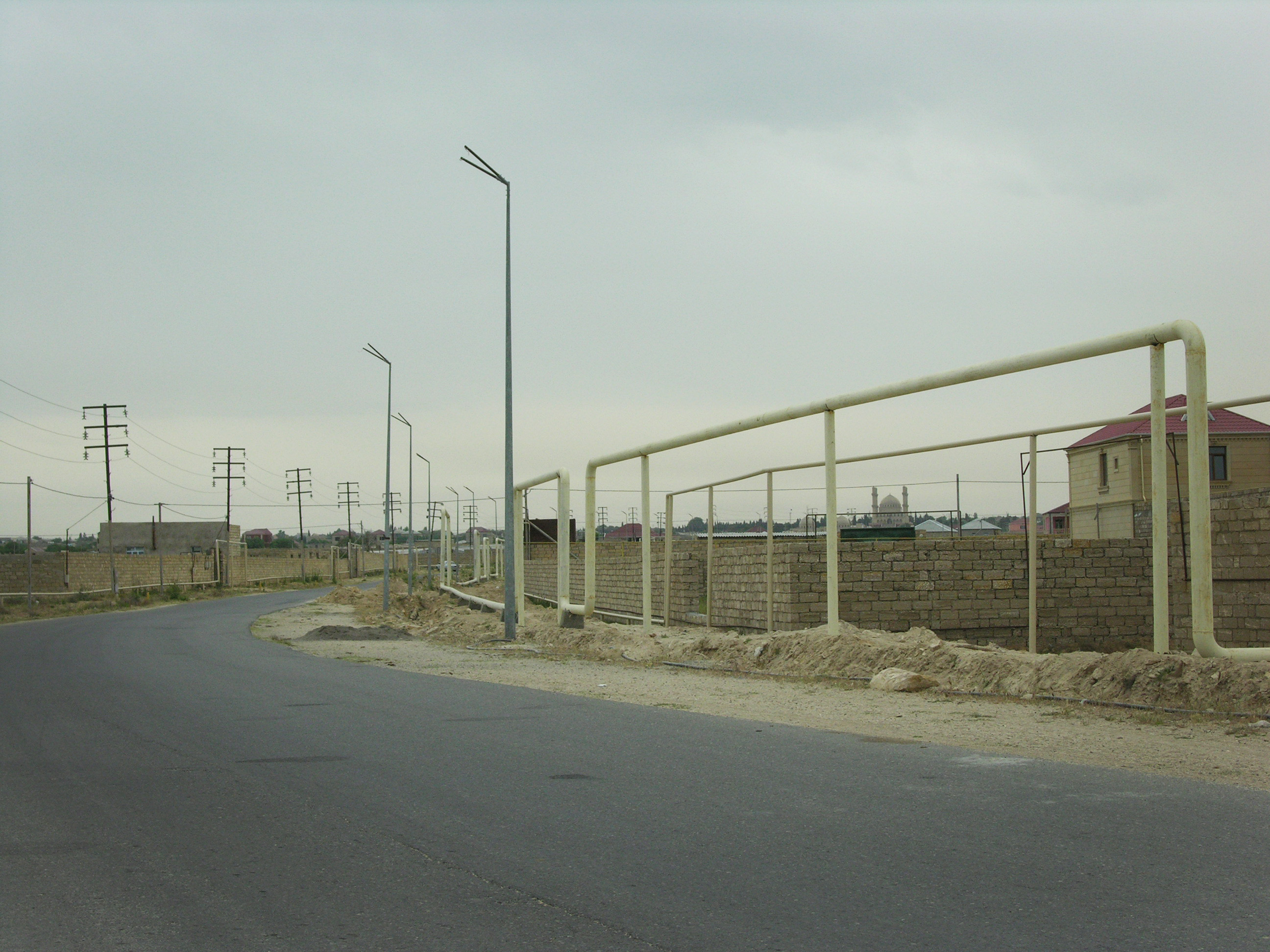
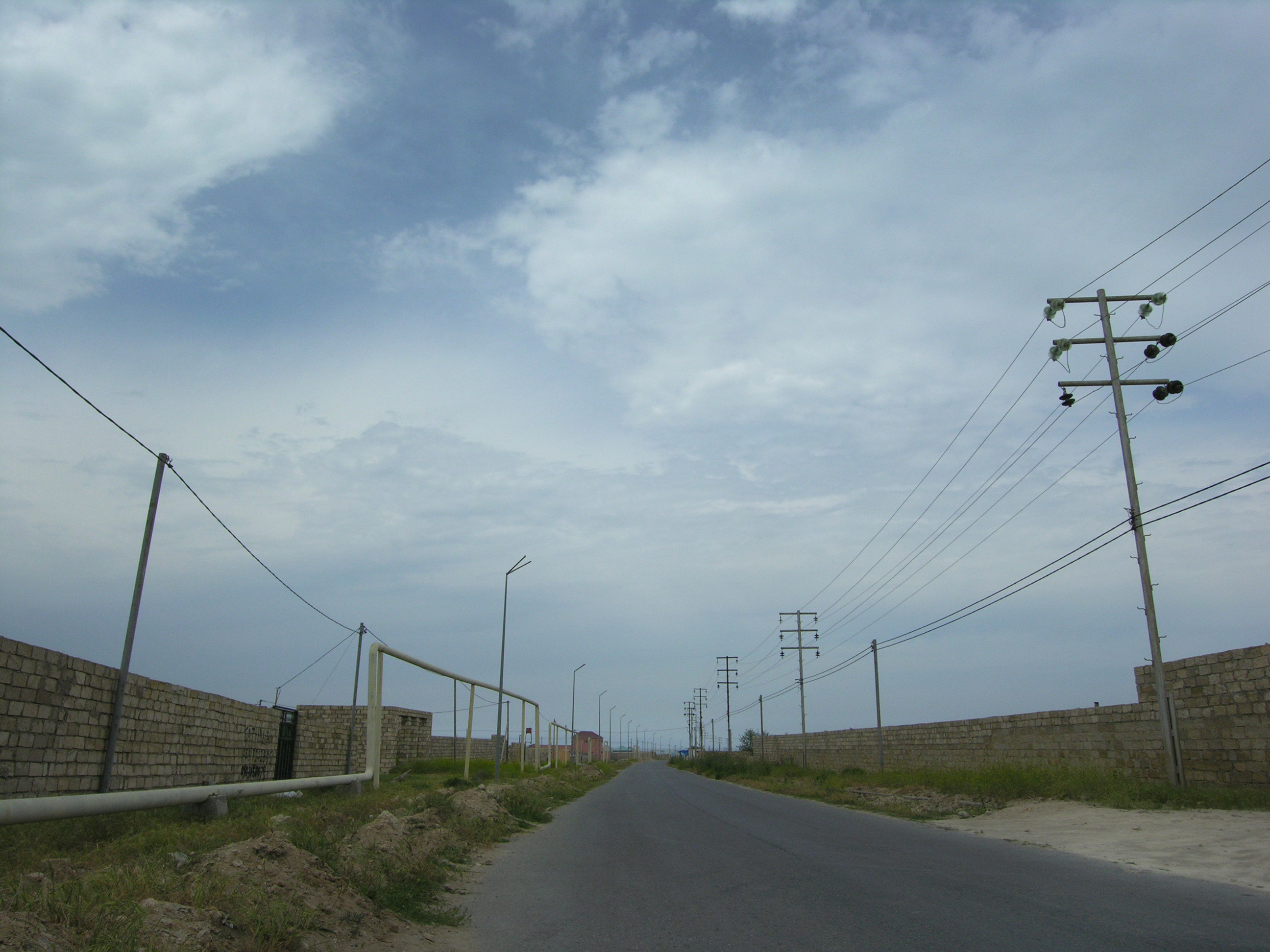
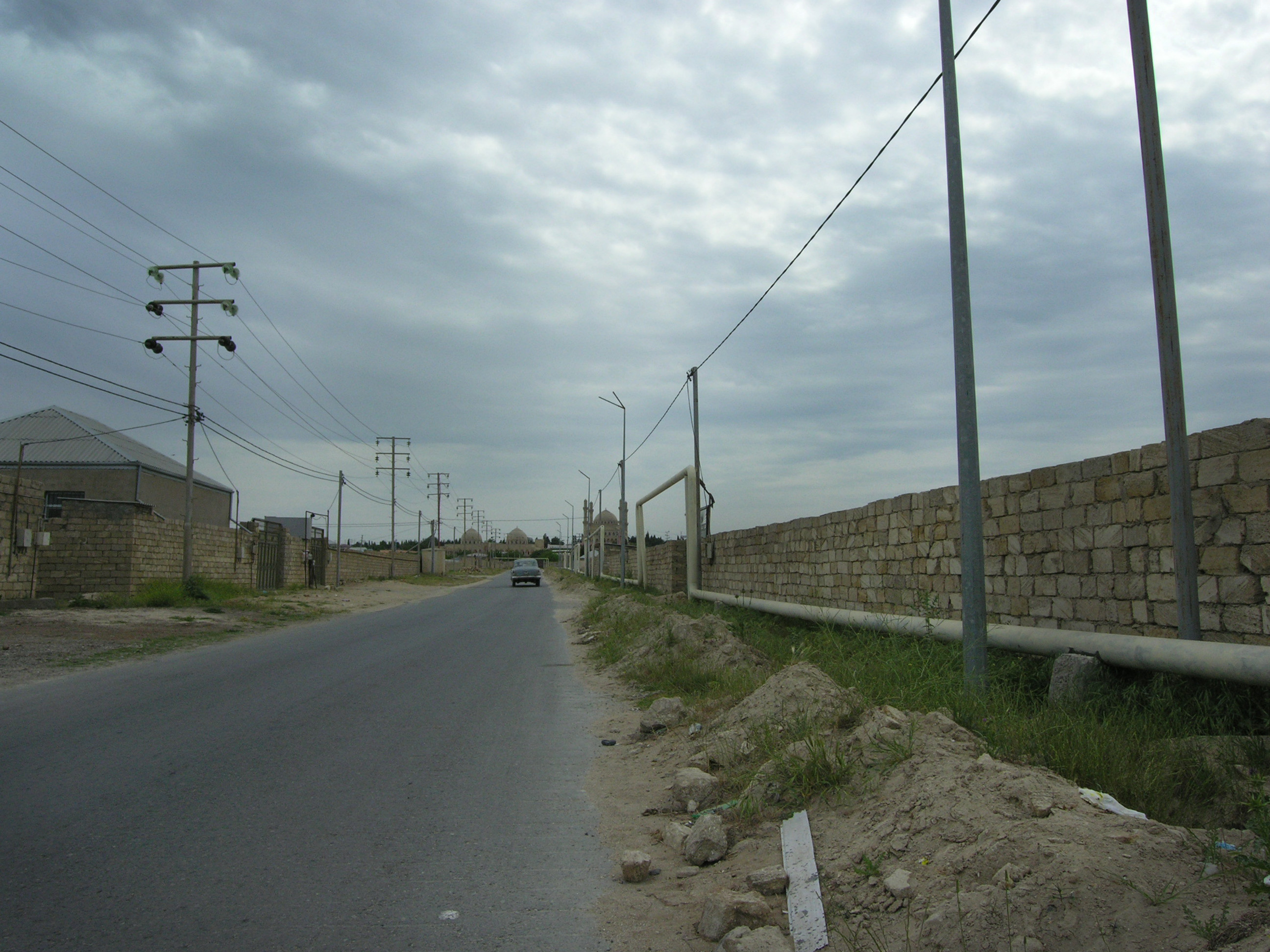
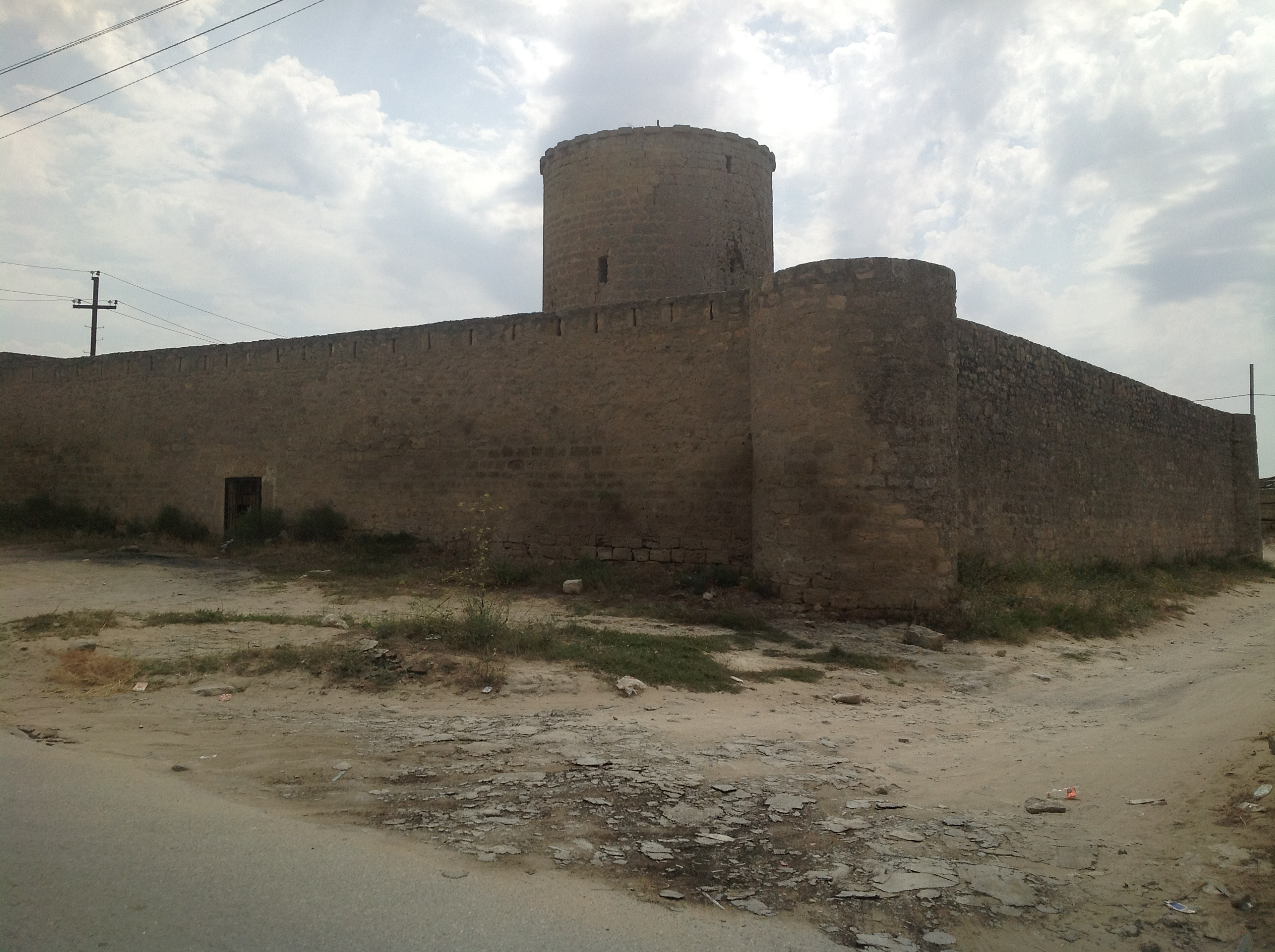

- Location within Azerbaijan
- Coordinates: 40°33′22″N 50°00′20″E
- Country: Azerbaijan
- City: Baku
- Raion: Sabunchu

Population (2008)
  - Total: 8,300
- Time zone: UTC+4 (AZT)
  - Summer (DST): AZT
- Amburan Lighthouse; Amburan mayakı
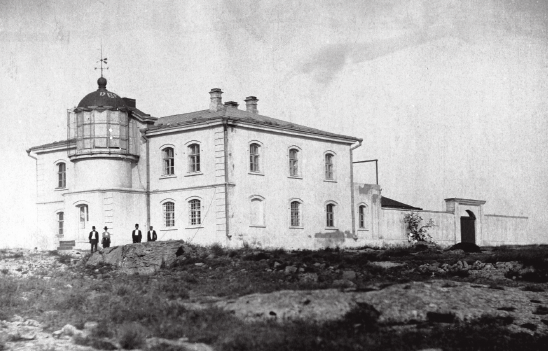
- Constructed: 1882
- Construction: masonry (foundation), masonry (tower)
- Height: 12 m (39 ft)
- Shape: cylindrical tower with balcony and light atop the lantern attached to a 2-storey keeper's house
- Markings: White (tower), red (roof)
- Power source: mains electricity
- First lit: 1884
- Focal height: 72 m (236 ft)
- Characteristic: Oc(2) W 15s

Nardaran is a settlement and municipality on the Abşeron Peninsula in Baku, Azerbaijan. It has a population of 8,300. Located 25 kilometers northeast of central Baku, it is politically part of the Baku city-subdivision and treated as a suburb. Unlike most of the rest of the country, which is religiously liberal, Nardaran is a center of conservative Shi'a Islam and pro-Iranian sentiment in Azerbaijan.

Nardaran's name comes from Persian: nar (pomegranate)نار + daran (trees) داران, i.e. "place with pomegranate trees".

The town is the site of a 14th-century castle, featuring a round tower approximately 12.5 meters high. During Soviet rule, the town was known as a center for growing flowers. Since Azerbaijan's independence, the economy has dwindled and the town is reputed for its caviar poachers.

== History ==
Proof that the history of the Baku village of Nardaran dates back to the Bronze Age BC is the discovery of the first human settlements in caves on its territory called “Galaga”.

On the rocks of the area called Umid-Gaya in the seaside part of Nardaran, as well as on the stones in Gobustan, there are various paintings.

=== Historical monuments of Nardaran ===
- Nardaran Mosque
- Nardaran pir
- Summer residence of Shirvanshahs
- Haji Bakhshi Mosque
- Nardaran Fortress
- Nardaran Light House

== Geography and climate ==
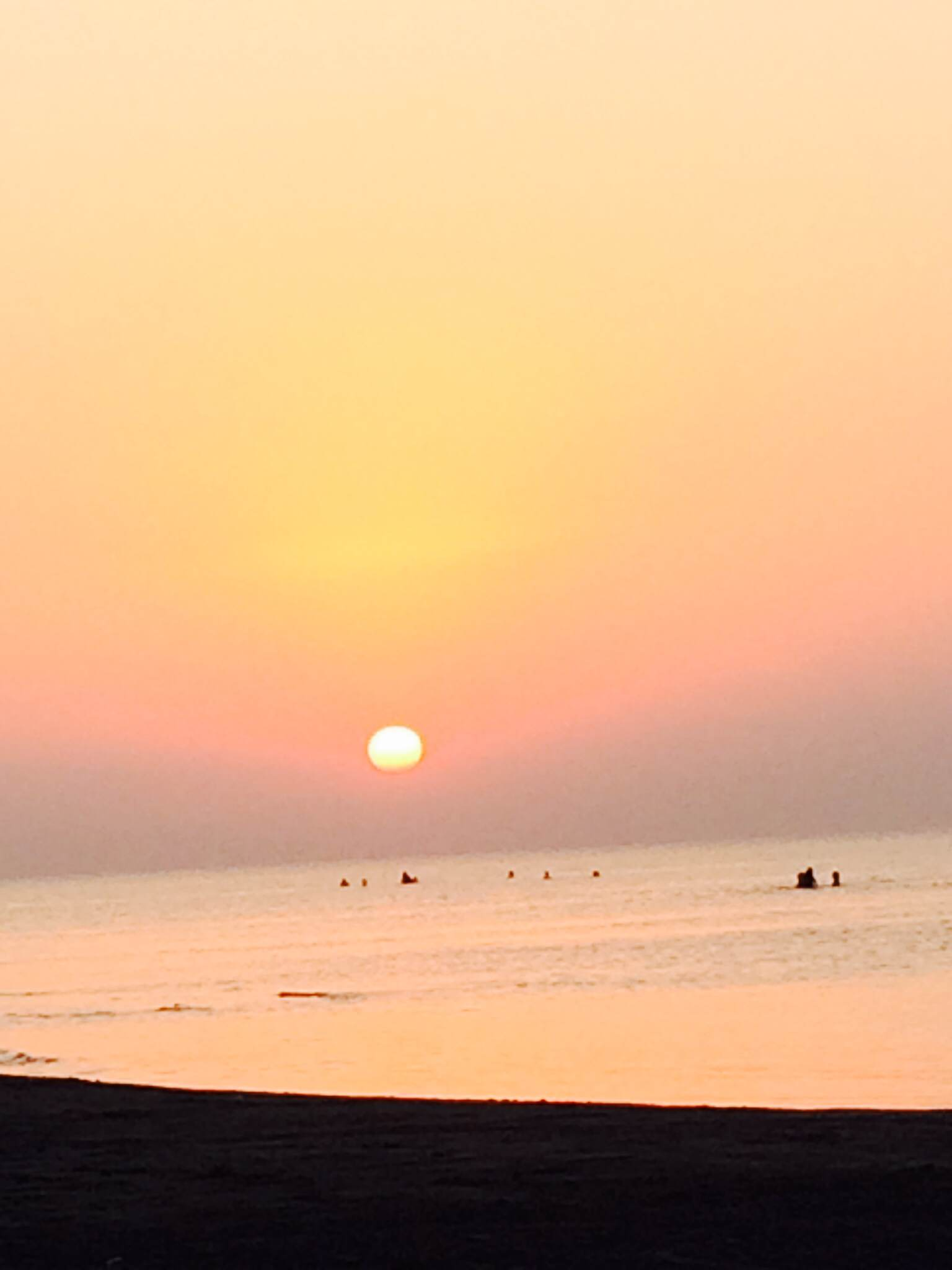
Nardaran Seaside

The village of Nardaran is one of the seaside villages of Baku. The village is surrounded by cliffs on both sides. The sunrise side is adjacent to the village of Bilgah, and the sunset side is adjacent to the villages of Kurdakhany and Pirshagi. Also the Sea Breeze Resort is located in this area.

== Center of Shia Islam ==
Nardaran "has long been a bastion of devout Shia Muslims" and is the only place in the whole of Azerbaijan where its inhabitants are devoutly religious and conservative, and where its streets display religious banners and where most women wear chadors in public. The town is home to a madrasa as well as the Rahima Khanim Mosque, a large Shia mosque built in the late 1990s over the tomb of Rahima Khanim, the sister of Imam Reza. The now banned Islamic Party of Azerbaijan was founded in this town and its base was centered there. Nardaran has been the site of strong protests and unrest, notable riots in June 2002 over what protesters deemed inadequate living standards and another in January 2006 which resulted in the deaths of three people. On November 26, 2015, two policemen and four suspected Shia Muslim militants were killed in an armed confrontation known as the Nardaran case. The religious leader of the Muslim Unity Movement Taleh Bagirov was also arrested, together with 14 other Nardaran residents.

As a result of this incident, the Azerbaijani parliament passed laws prohibiting people with religious education received abroad to implement Islamic rites and ceremonies in Azerbaijan, as well as to preaching in mosques and occupying leading positions in the country; as well as prohibiting the display of religious paraphernalia, flags and slogans, except in places of worship, religious centers and offices. Ashura festivities in public have also been banned. The Azerbaijani government also passed a law to remove the citizenship of Azerbaijani citizens who fight abroad.

== Transport ==
Tram line is planned in this area in the future.

== Gallery ==
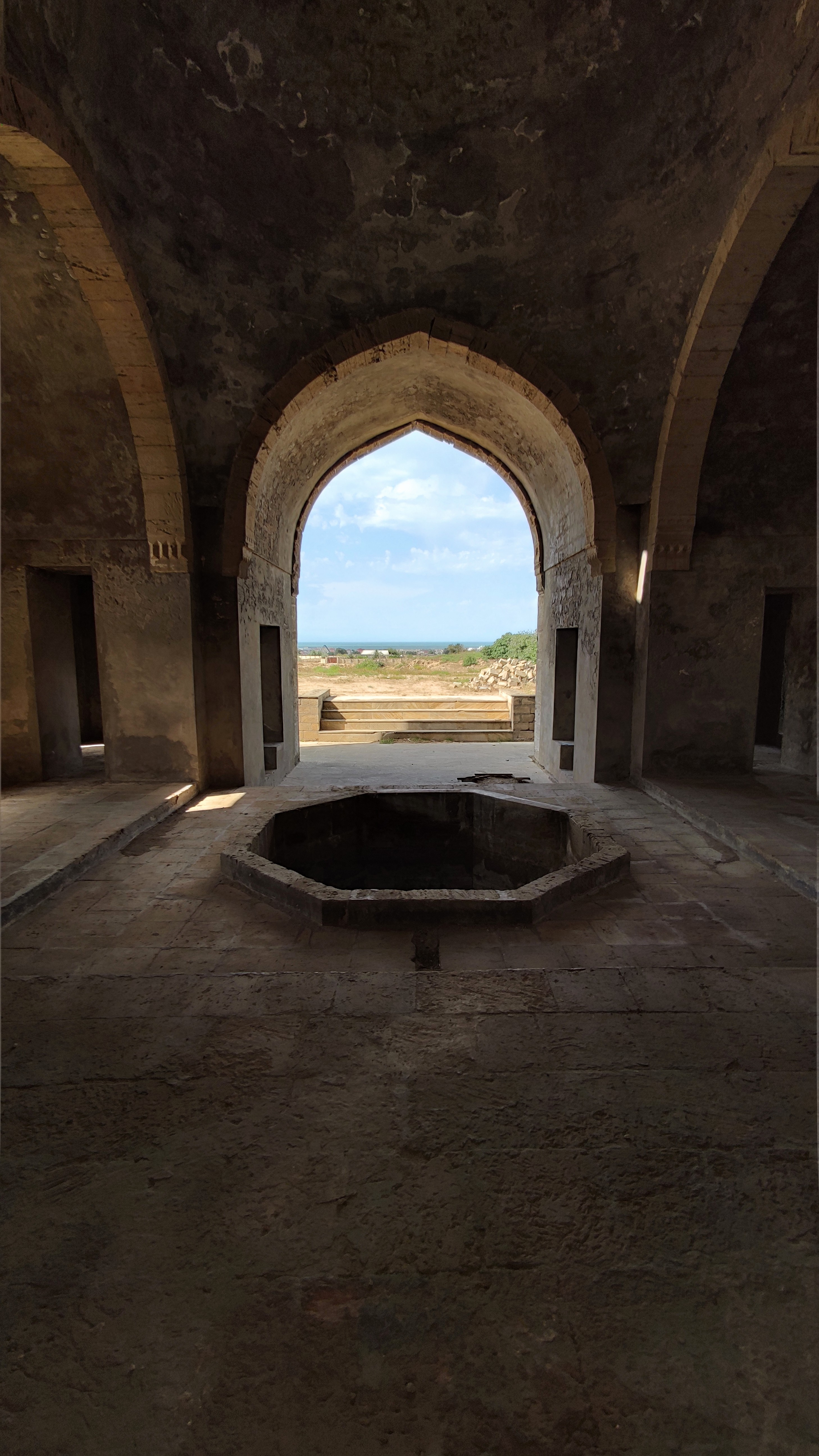
Summer residence of Shirvanshahs

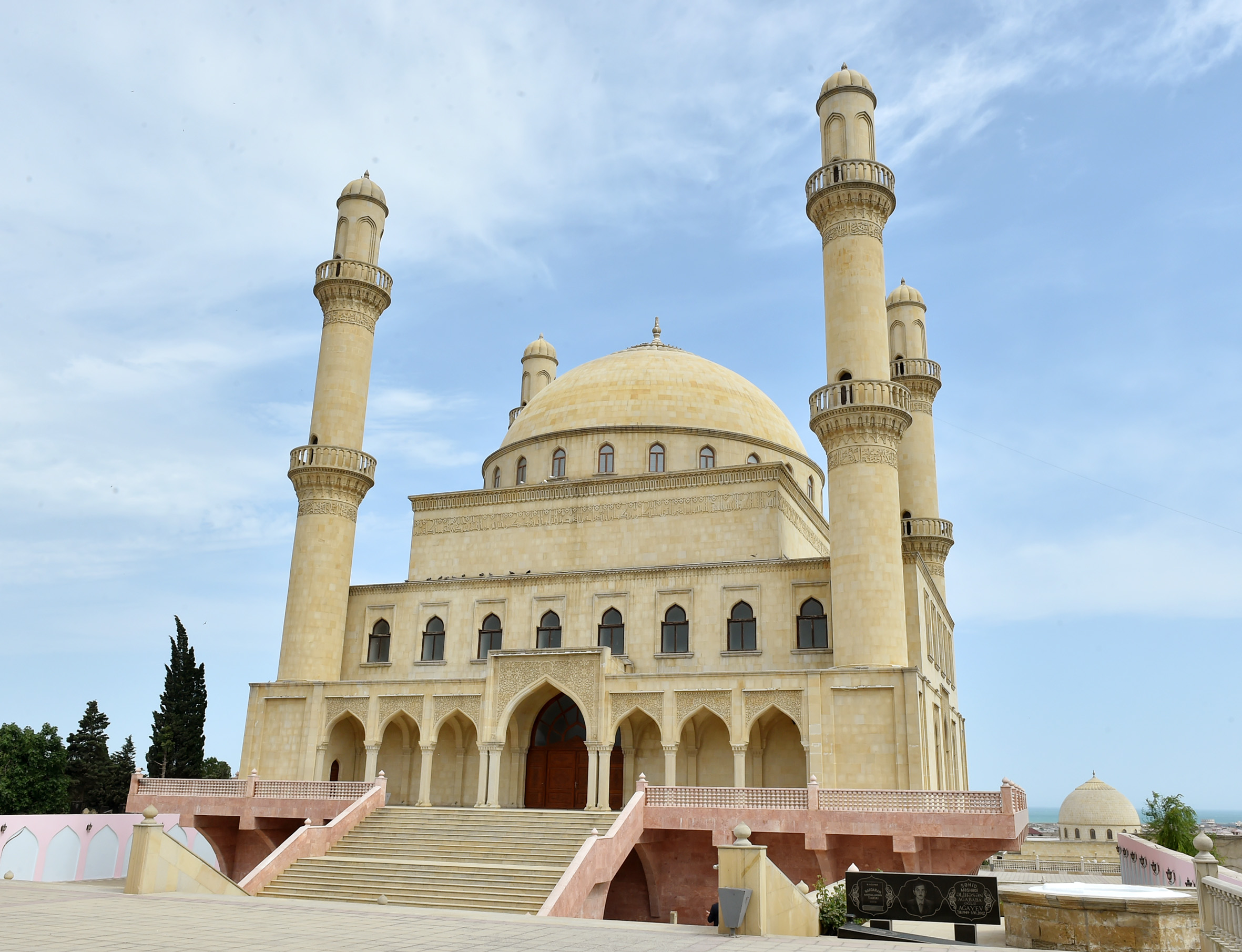
Nardaran Mosque

Secondary School No 295 in Nardaran

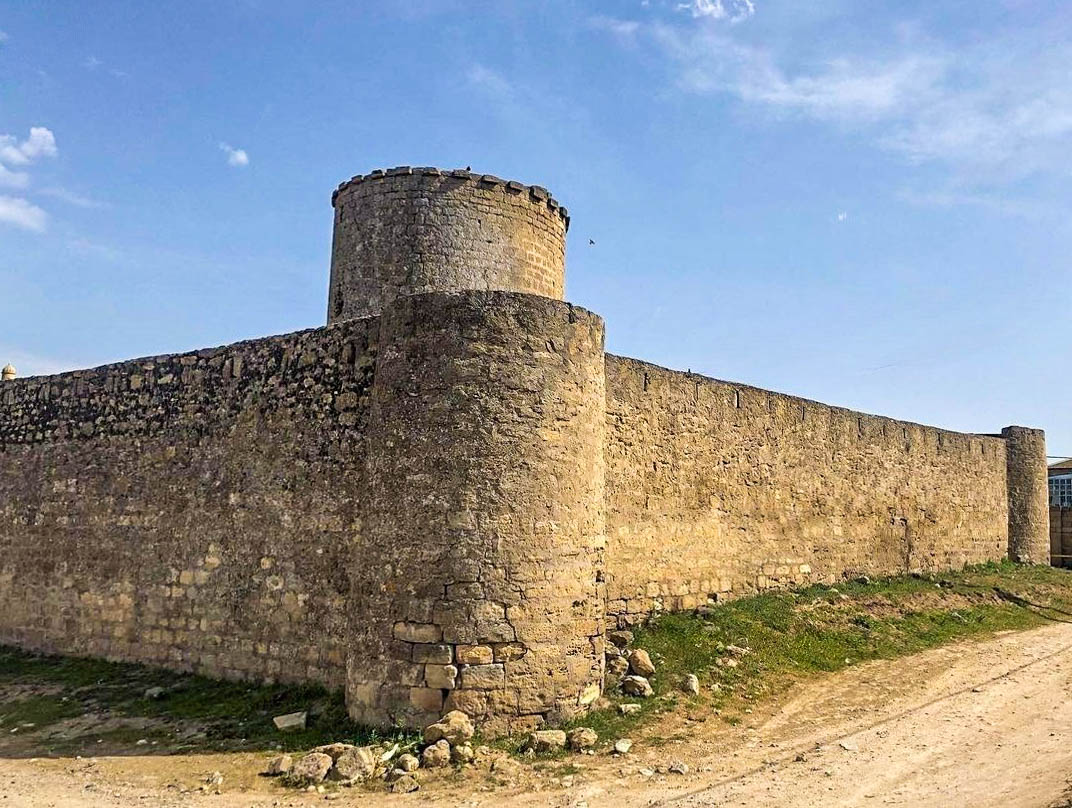
Nardaran Castle

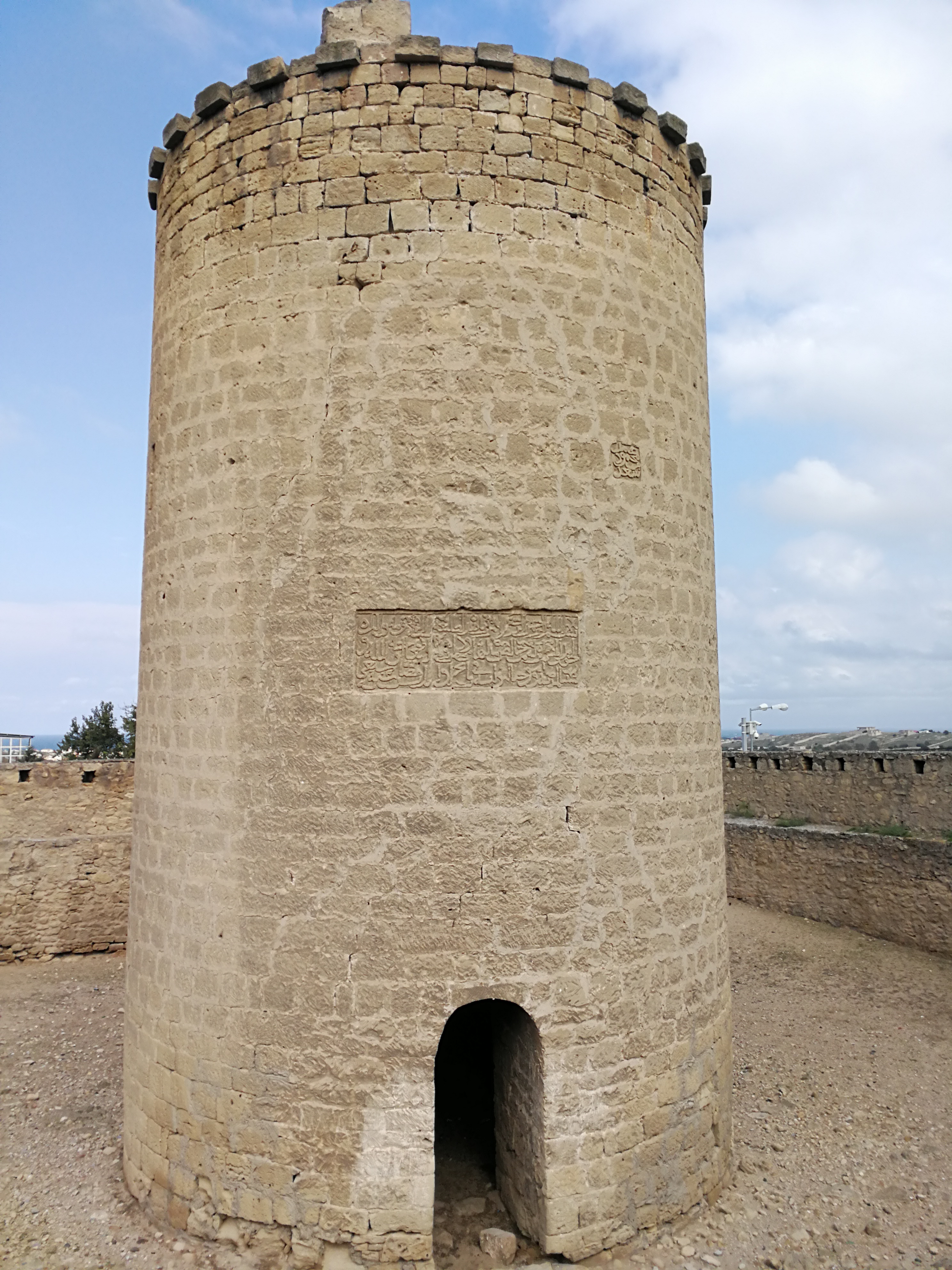
Nardaran Tower

== See also ==
- List of lighthouses in Azerbaijan
- Baku Walk of Stars
