= Tawhid Ibrahim Begli =

Shia Azerbaijani-Iranian cleric and militia leader (born 1989)

Tawheed Ibraheem Begli
- Tövhid İbrahimbəyli
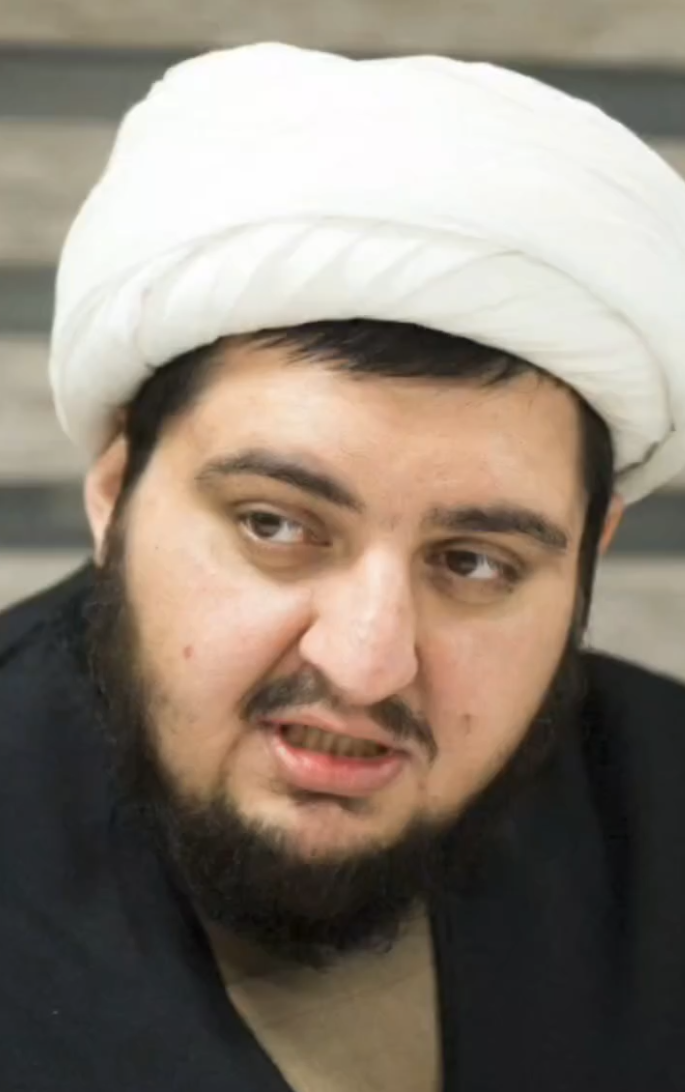
- Ibrahim in 2023

1st leader of Husseiniyoun
- Incumbent
- Assumed office 2016

Personal details
- Born: 1989 (age 36–37)
- Citizenship: Azerbaijan; Iran
- Education: Qom Seminary
- Profession: Shia cleric Militia leader

Military service
- Allegiance: Iran
- Years of service: 2015–present
- Rank: Commander
- Unit: Islamic Resistance Movement of Azerbaijan
- Battles/wars: Syrian Civil War

Tawhid Ibrahim Begli (Azerbaijani: Tövhid İbrahimbəyli Persian: توحید ابراهیم‌بیلی, romanized: Tohid Ebrahim Beli, born 1989 in Lankaran) is a religious Shia Islamist Azerbaijani cleric and the leader of the Islamic Resistance Movement of Azerbaijan (Husseinyoun), who opposes the regime of Ilham Aliyev. He is wanted by the Azerbaijani authorities for terrorism.

== Biography ==
Ibrahim Begli was born in 1989. Tawhid Ibrahim Begli's father, Alam Ibrahimli, and his mother, Soodabeh Ibrahimli, were ethnically Talysh, originally from Lankaran in Azerbaijan and later settled in Mashhad, Iran.

In 2011, he was arrested for demonstrating against the Israeli Embassy in Azerbaijan. In 2016, he went into exile in Iran and proposed to create a Shia Azerbaijani brigade. This brigade came to known as the Islamic Resistance Movement of Azerbaijan.

He is a staunch critic of the regime of Ilham Aliyev and stated that the aim of his movement (Hussainiyoun) is "to create a discourse, to create a deterrent power among the Shia Muslims of Azerbaijan and to strengthen and empower them based on the model of resistance".

Ibrahim became a religious Shia cleric after completing his religious education from Qom Seminary.

Ibrahim is currently reported to be residing in Iran.

== Activities ==
In 2013, Tawhid Ibrahim Begli met with Ali Khamenei, the supreme leader of Iran, during a meeting called "Ulema of the Ummah and the Islamic Awakening" as the chairman of the "Assembly of Fighting Clerics of the Republic of Azerbaijan". During the meeting, he spoke about the situation of Muslim prisoners in the Republic of Azerbaijan.

In late 2015 and early 2016, Tawhid instructed 14 students from Azerbaijan who were studying religion in Qom and Mashhad to establish a "Husseiniyun Brigade" consisting of students. Begli first gathered the 14 students at the workplace of Iskander Husseinov in Qom, and after a day of waiting and training, transferred them to a military unit near the capital of Syria, Damascus.

Ibrahim was often seen in pictures with Qassem Soleimani, the former commander of the IRGC's Quds Force. Ibrahim's group, Husseiniyoun or the Islamic Resistance Movement of Azerbaijan, was named by Qassem Soleimani himself. It was given in order to mimic the names of Hezbollah, Fatemiyoun, and Zainabiyoun.

According to some media outlets in the Republic of Azerbaijan, Ibrahim Begli immediately stated in Damascus that their intention was not only to fight ISIS, but also to prepare for an uprising in Azerbaijan. However, the movement has stated that its sole purpose is to confront extremists and has no plans to expand its activities in Azerbaijan. According to Tawhid Ibrahim, he did not support Azerbaijan and did not directly order the deployment fighters to Nagorno-Karabakh because of Israel's support for Azerbaijan.

In 2017, Tawheed attended the "Memorial of the Martyrs of Nardaran" in Zanjan to commemorate victims of a 2015 crackdown by the Azerbaijani police on Shia worshippers on the Arbayeen. There, he spoke about the incident of the attack by the special police forces of the Azerbaijani Ministry of Internal Affairs in 2015 on the Shias of Nardaran, which killed four residents.

Ibrahim and his followers visited the tomb of Qasem Soleimani in Kerman in 2020.

In a message, Begli and his movement congratulated then Iranian president Ebrahim Raisi on his victory in the 2021 Iranian presidential election.

== Arrest warrant ==
Ibrahim Beyli is suspected by the Azerbaijani authorities of being the planner of the attempted assassination of Elmar Valiyev, and of having sent the veteran of the civil war in Syria, Yunis Safarov, to execute the order. Ibrahim had called for the assassination of Elmar Valiyev, the then mayor of Ganja, in January 2017 through the extremist website "nur-az.com". A year later, Yunis Safarov attempted to assassinate Elmar Valiyev.

He is the subject of an arrest warrant from the Azerbaijani state for his membership in an Islamist pro-Iranian organization.

== See also ==
- Ali Reza Tavassoli
- Saqib Haider Karbalai
