= Azerbaijan–Iran relations =

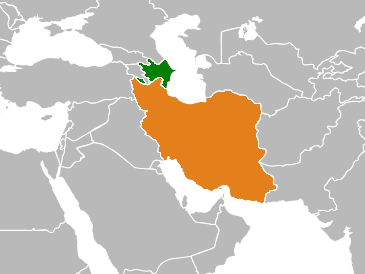

- Azerbaijan: Iran

Diplomatic mission
- Embassy of Azerbaijan, Tehran: Embassy of Iran, Baku

Envoy
- Ambassador Ali Alizade: Ambassador Mojtaba Demirchilou

Official diplomatic relations between the Republic of Azerbaijan and the Islamic Republic of Iran were established following the dissolution of the Soviet Union (1991). Iran and Azerbaijan share, to a large extent, the same history, religion, and culture. The territory of what is now the Republic of Azerbaijan was separated from Iran in the first half of the 19th century, through the Russo-Persian Wars. In the area to the north of the river Aras, the territory of the contemporary Republic of Azerbaijan was part of Iran until it was occupied by Russia. Iran and Azerbaijan are both majority Shia Muslim nations. They have respectively the highest and second highest Shia population percentage in the world, as well as the history of Shi'ism which is rooted in both nations from exactly the same moment in history, whereas the majority of the population of both their neighboring nations are either predominantly Christians or Sunni Muslims.

In recent decades there have been tensions between the two countries as their political alignments vary by degree. The Republic of Azerbaijan has become increasingly pro-Western and is an ally of Israel, Turkey and the United States (the latter two being NATO members), whereas the Islamic Republic of Iran is largely anti-Western and is an ally of China, Palestine and Russia. Iranian rhetoric has periodically portrayed Azerbaijan’s ties with Israel as a security threat.

In May 1918, the Musavat government adopted the name "Azerbaijan" for the newly established Azerbaijan Democratic Republic for political reasons, even though the name of "Azerbaijan" had always been used to refer to the adjacent region of contemporary northwest Iran. As the Soviet Union dissolved in 1991, a relatively downwards spiral started in the modern relations between Iran and Azerbaijan. In May 2015, the Ambassador of Iran to Azerbaijan announced that it did not recognize the Nagorno-Karabakh Republic.

Iran recognized Azerbaijan's independence in 1991, and diplomatic relations between the two countries were established in 1992. Iran has an embassy in Baku and a consulate-general in Nakhchivan City. Azerbaijan has an embassy in Tehran and a consulate-general in Tabriz. Both countries are full members of the Economic Cooperation Organization (ECO) and the Organisation of Islamic Cooperation (OIC).

== Context ==
For almost all of its history, the territory of the present-day Republic of Azerbaijan was a part of the various Iranian/Persian empires or Persianate empires, specifically during the reign of dynasties such as Median, Achaemenid, Parthians, Sassanid, the Shirvanshah, various dynasties of the Iranian Intermezzo, the Kara Koyunlu, the Ak Koyunlu, the Safavids, the Afsharids, the Zands, and the Qajars. The South Caucasus, in general, has been influenced by Iranian culture for thousands of years. In the course of the 19th century, following the occupation of the Caucasus by Russian troops during the Russo-Persian War (1804-1813) and Russo-Persian War (1826-1828), Qajar Iran was forced to cede what is now Azerbaijan, alongside Georgia, Dagestan, and Armenia to Imperial Russia under the terms of the treaties of Gulistan and Turkmenchay.

According to Pierre Thorez: "Although throughout history the Caucasus has usually been incorporated in political entities belonging to the Iranian world, at the beginning of the 19th century Russia took it, along with the Transcaucasus, from the Qajars (1133–1342/1779–1924), severing those historical ties. Since the establishment of Soviet power on Caucasian territory, relations with Persia have been reduced to an insignificant level.". According to Tadeusz Swietochowski, the territories of Iran and the republic of Azerbaijan usually shared the same history from the time of ancient Media (ninth to seventh centuries b.c.) and the Persian Empire (sixth to fourth centuries b.c.).

During an official visit to Baku in October 2012, Iranian President Mahmoud Ahmadinejad described his country's relations with Azerbaijan as "brotherly and very deep," pointing to the countries’ shared ethnic and religious heritage. A large amount of ethnic Azerbaijanis populate the northwest region of Iran and are native to the region, which is also called Azerbaijan, and both countries are majority Shia, while they hold the 1st and 2nd largest Shia adherents by population percentages in the world. As with almost their entire history, which is fully intertwined, the history of Shi'ism as the majority religion is rooted from exactly the same moment in history, dating back to the Safavid era. Representing two of only four Shia majority countries in the world, Azerbaijan and Iran share religious ties and a common border. Far more ethnic Azerbaijanis live in Iran than in the Republic of Azerbaijan itself (approximately nine million), a result of the irrevocable forced cession by Qajar Iran of the territory that nowadays comprises Azerbaijan Republic to Imperial Russia in the course of Russo-Persian Wars from the 17th to the 19th centuries. Although Azerbaijan and Iran share strong historical and cultural connections, the countries are not natural allies. According to Alex Vatanka at the Middle East Institute in Washington, D.C., "Ahmadinejad’s statement blatantly misrepresented the current state of affairs; today, it is not historical affinity but rather intense suspicion and rivalry that shape ties between Baku and Tehran. The same month Ahmadinejad made the statement, a court in Baku gave lengthy prison sentences to 22 Azerbaijanis charged with spying for Iran’s Islamic Revolutionary Guards Corps (IRGC) and plotting to carry out attacks against U.S. and Israeli targets in Azerbaijan."

== 1918–1920 ==
In 1918, the Musavat government adopted the name "Azerbaijan" for the newly established Azerbaijan Democratic Republic, for political reasons, even though the name of "Azerbaijan" had always been used to refer to the adjacent region of contemporary northwest Iran.

Prior to the establishment of the Azerbaijan Democratic Republic, the name was only in use for the region of contemporary northwest Iran, namely Iranian Azerbaijan. Historically, the region of what is now the Azerbaijan Republic was known as Shirvan and Arran; two historically Iranian regions.

According to Hamid Ahmadi:

Though the weak Iranian state was in a transitional period, struggling with foreign domination, the Iranian political and intellectual elites in Tehran and Tabriz, the capital of Iranian Azerbaijan, soon protested against such naming. For almost a year, the printed media in Tehran, Tabriz, and other big Iranian cities on the one side, and the media in Baku, the capital of the newly independent Republic of Azerbaijan, on the other side, presented their arguments to prove that such naming was wrong or right. Iranians were generally suspicious of Baku's choice and regarded confiscating the historical name of Iran's north-western province as a pan-Turkist conspiracy planned by the Ottoman Young Turks, then active in Baku, for their ultimate goal of establishing a pan-Turk entity (Turan) from Central Asia to Europe. By calling the real historical Azerbaijan located in Iran "southern Azerbaijan", the pan-Turkists could claim the necessity of unifying the Republic of Azerbaijan and "southern Azerbaijan" in their future "Turan." Fearing such threats, Shaikh Mohammad Khiabani, a popular member of the political elite in Iranian Azerbaijan and the leader of the Democratic Party (Firqhe Democrat), changed the name of the province to Azadistan (land of freedom). According to Ahmad Kasravi, Khiabani's deputy at the time, the main reason for such a change was to prevent any future claim by the pan-Turkist Ottomans to Iranian Azerbaijan on the basis of the similarity of the names.

According to Tadeusz Swietochowski:

Although the proclamation restricted its claim to the territory north of the Araxes, the use of the name Azerbaijan would soon bring objections from Iran. In Tehran, suspicions were aroused that the Republic of Azerbaijan served as an Ottoman device for detaching the Tabriz province from Iran. Likewise, the national revolutionary Jangali movement in Gilan, while welcoming the independence of every Muslim land as a "source of joy," asked in its newspaper if the choice of the name Azerbaijan implied the new republic's desire to join Iran. If so, they said, it should be stated clearly, otherwise Iranians would be opposed to calling that republic Azerbaijan. Consequently, to allay Iranian fears, the Azerbaijani government would accommodatingly use the term Caucasian Azerbaijan in its documents for circulation abroad.

Although a naming dispute had arisen with Qajar Iran, with the latter protesting this decision, in tandem, the young Azerbaijan Republic also faced a threat from the nascent Soviets in Moscow and the Armenians. To escape the possibility of a Soviet invasion and an even greater imminent threat of an Armenian invasion, Muslim Nakhchivan proposed being annexed by Iran. The then pro-British government in Tehran led by Vossug ed Dowleh made endeavours among Baku's leadership to join Iran. To promote this idea, Vosugh ed Dowleh dispatched two separate Iranian delegations; one to Baku and one to the Paris Peace Conference in 1919. The delegation at Baku, at the behest of Zia ol Din Tabatabaee, held intensive negotiations with the leadership of the Musavat party during the increasing chaos and instability in the city. During the closing stages, an accord was reached between them; however, before the idea was presented to Vossug ed Dowleh in Tehran, the Communists took over Baku and terminated the Musavat-Ottoman rule. The Iranian delegation at Paris, which was headed by foreign minister Firouz Nosrat-ed-Dowleh III, reached a unity negotiation with the delegation from Baku and signed a confederation agreement.

On 16 July 1919, the Council of Ministers [of ADR] appointed Adil Khan Ziatkhan, who had up to that time served as Assistant Minister of Foreign Affairs, diplomatic representative of the republic of Azerbaijan to the court of the Iranian King of Kings.

In the end, these efforts proved to be of no avail. In 1920, the Bolshevik 11th Red Army conquered the Caucasus and the Azerbaijan Democratic Republic became Azerbaijan SSR. In 1922, Azerbaijan SSR was incorporated into the Soviet Union, and from that point till 1991, the relations between Iran and Azerbaijan continued in the context of the Soviet-Iranian relations. However, after World War II, the Azerbaijani Ministry of Foreign Affairs could issue limited visas for travel to Iran only and Iran also maintained a consulate in Baku.

== Modern history ==
=== Membership of OIC, relations with Israel and alienation of Iran ===
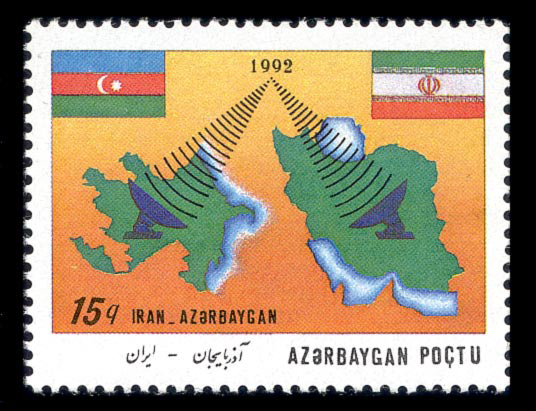
Stamp of Azerbaijan, 1992

Iran was one of the first countries to establish full diplomatic relations with Azerbaijan. Following the declaration of the Parliament of Azerbaijan to restore independence of Azerbaijan Republic on 18 October 1991, and in early December 1991, Iranian Foreign Minister Ali Akbar Velayati visited Baku, where he signed a number of agreements on political, economic, and cultural cooperation and pledged to support Azerbaijan's membership in the Organisation of the Islamic Conference (now the Organisation of Islamic Cooperation). Within the few days after the visit, Iran recognized Azerbaijan on 4 January 1992, upgraded its consulate in Baku to establish full diplomatic relations.

Tehran was quick to recognize Azerbaijan as an independent state and set out to create amicable relations with a country similar to its own. Iran saw Azerbaijan as fertile ground for spreading its Islamic Revolution further. Azerbaijan was skeptical of Iran's theocratic government and looked instead to Turkey as a strategic partner. "Iran’s initial euphoria at the prospect of a new Shia state quickly turned into dread, as Baku expressed irredentist sentiments and promoted the idea of a ‘Greater Azerbaijan,’ which would unite Azerbaijan (the country) and Azerbaijan (the region in northwest Iran). Fearing Baku's intentions to fuel secessionism inside its borders, Iran provided vital backing to Armenia in its war against Azerbaijan over the disputed region of Nagorno-Karabakh, which dragged on from 1988 to 1994 and ended in an inconclusive cease-fire." Iran's siding with Armenia during the First Nagorno-Karabakh War has not been forgotten in Azerbaijan, and Tehran's support of Armenia—especially in light of Azerbaijan's recent growth in power projection—has not abated.

Azerbaijan's power is growing primarily because of the influx of oil and gas revenues emanating from the Caspian Sea. Recognizing this, Iran has sought to reengage its northern neighbor and nudge Baku to reconsider its foreign relations—principally its close ties with Israel—because nowhere in the region does Iran see a more unambiguous Israeli footprint than it does in Azerbaijan. "Israel and Azerbaijan share the common goal of containing Iranian influence. In this joint front, Azerbaijan provides proximity to Iran—with much ion about Azerbaijani soil being used as a staging ground for Israeli military operations—while Israel possesses superior weapons technologies and other resources." In February 2012, Azerbaijan signed a $1.6 billion defense deal with Israel that included air defense systems, intelligence hardware, and unmanned aerial vehicles (UAVs). Azerbaijan is aware that its overtures and agreements with Israel anger Iran, but its response is that Iran's strong ties with Armenia anger Azerbaijan. "When Tehran has appealed to Azerbaijan’s Islamic identity, the Azerbaijanis quickly point out that Tehran’s relations with Armenia have been trouble-free compared with its ties with its Muslim neighbors."

=== Abulfaz Elchibey ===
After the rise of Popular Front of Azerbaijan to power in June 1992, the newly elected President Abulfaz Elchibey endorsed the unification of the Azerbaijani populations of his country and Iranian Azerbaijan, and to that end, autonomy for the Iranian Azerbaijanis, a stance which alienated the Iranian government.

Elchibey was against the breakup of his own nation based on ethnic lines, stating "Armenians have been living in Azerbaijan for centuries, and as full citizens of the state – just like the Lezgins, Tats, and Talyish...let them continue to live here as equal citizens before the law – but they must obey the laws of the state, no country would demand any less." He also denounced Iran's peace efforts during the First Nagorno-Karabakh War, claiming Iran was attempting to give Armenia the advantage. However, during the war, Iran pressured Armenia and Karabakh Armenians to halt the offensive. Veiled threats first appeared in the English-language Kayhan International:

If our peace and border security is going to be threatened... our leaders cannot afford to let the situation take care of itself

This statement was followed by official warnings from the Iranian Foreign Ministry, accompanied by military reinforcements along Iran's borders with Azerbaijan and Armenia. Iran also gave financial aid to Nakhchivan and pressured Armenia to refrain from attacking the enclave.

In 1992, Elchibey, during a visit to Turkey, described himself as a soldier of Atatürk and called for the downfall of Iran, which prompted a member of the Iranian parliament to threaten retaliation.

Since then however, the two nations have had better relations, although tensions have sometimes been high, cooperating in areas including trade, security, and the energy sector. However, some tensions include the growing relationship between the United States, Israel, and Azerbaijan, Caspian Sea territorial issues, and Iran's support for Armenia. President Ilham Aliyev of Azerbaijan had said that he did not support a United States attack against Iran. Novruz Mamedov, Azerbaijani presidential international affairs department head in 2005, has also said that Azerbaijan would not allow the United States to build bases within Azerbaijani territory and would not help in an attack against Iran.

There were incidents involving of the use of force or its demonstration on the part of Iranian military forces. On 23 July 2001, an Iranian warship and two jets forced a research vessel working on behalf of BP-Amoco in the Araz-Alov-Sharg field in the sector of the Caspian Sea which is claimed by Iran. On 22 February 2007, Azerbaijani media outlets reported that Iranian helicopters had violated the air space of Azerbaijan by flying over the southern town of Astara for over 20 minutes. Reportedly, the flight took place right over the city administration building and caused considerable panic among the local residents. But for the most part Azerbaijan and Iran avoided any serious military clashes. In May 2005 Baku and Tehran signed a non-aggression pact barring third countries from using their territories for offensive operations against each other.

In March 2006, during the World Congress of Azerbaijanis convention in Baku, a number of participants addressed both the concept of a "unified Azerbaijan" and "human rights abuses" against Azeris in Iran. A diplomatic controversy occurred when Iran's ambassador to Azerbaijan, Afshar Suleymani, an Azeri himself, expressed indignation concerning the views of some speakers who advocated the union of "southern" and "northern" Azerbaijan. Certain anti-Iran claims during an official seminar in Baku were harmful to relations between the two countries and were especially against the interests of the Republic of Azerbaijan.

According to Karl Rahder, "Most analysts agree that the Iranian government has attempted to infiltrate Azerbaijan with agents and fifth column sleeper cells to weaken Azerbaijan from within for many years." Opposite views stress on Azerbaijan's territorial claims over Iran.

President Ilham Aliyev's attitude of calling Iranian Azeris "Azerbaijanis who live in Iran" has angered some in the Iranian Azeri community. The last time that a minister of the Azerbaijan republic referred to Iranian Azeri's in that manner, the representative of Ardabil province in the Iranian parliament protested.

=== Collaborative-conflicting energy issues ===
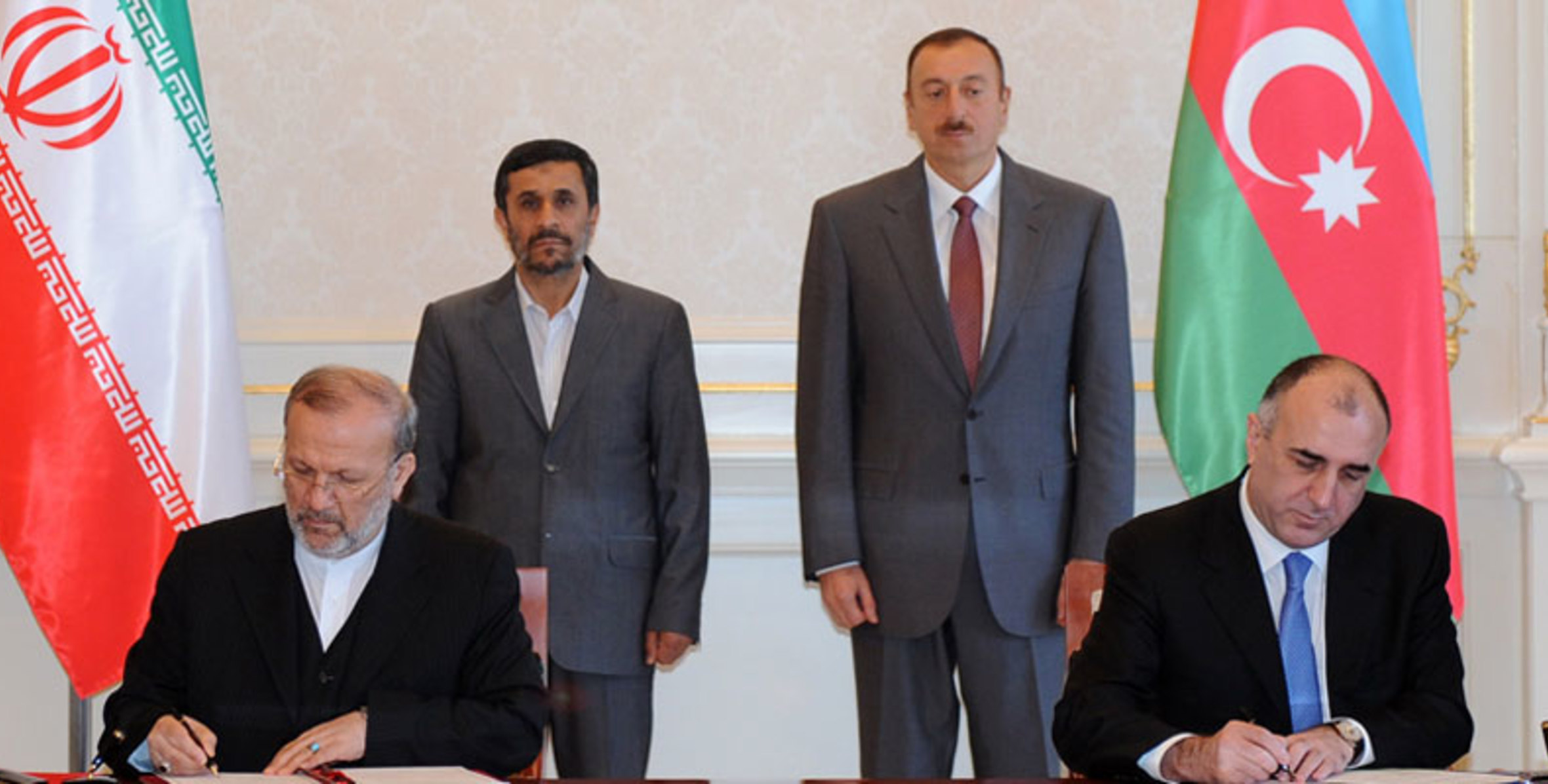
In 2010, a memorandum of understanding and co-operation in the field of energy and transport was signed in Baku.

On December 20, 2005, Azerbaijani President Ilham Aliev and Iranian President Mahmoud Ahmadinejad attended the opening ceremony of a new gas pipeline from Iran to Azerbaijan's landlocked Nakhchivan Autonomous Region, which is separated from the mainland of Azerbaijan by a strip of Armenian territory. Nakhchivan has been cut off from gas supplies as a result of the Armenia-Azerbaijan conflict over Nagorno-Karabakh. Under a 25-year swap contract signed between the two countries in August 2004, the new pipeline will supply the region with Iranian natural gas. Azerbaijan will also deliver its gas to Iran's northeastern provinces. The volume of gas imports to Nakhchivan is expected to reach 250 million cubic meters in 2006 and 350 million cubic meters in 2007.

On March 19, 2007, President Mahmoud Ahmadinejad of Iran joined President Robert Kocharyan of Armenia to inaugurate a gas pipeline to pump Iranian natural gas to Armenia. Armenia is Azerbaijan's arch-foe.

=== Cockroach cartoon controversies ===
In 2006, an Iranian newspaper published a cartoon describing nine methods to deal with cockroaches. As the cockroach speaks the Azerbaijani language, it had sparked protests by Azerbaijanis in Azerbaijan and in Iran as well for its alleged comparison of Azerbaijanis to cockroaches. The cartoonist was an Iranian Azerbaijani man.

=== Iran's anti-Azerbaijani media broadcasts ===
On February 3, 2007, Azerbaijan's minister of communications and information technology, Ali Abbasov, and the head of the Iranian State Broadcasting Agency, Ezzatollah Zarghami, signed a Memorandum of Understanding (MoU) on bilateral media cooperation. Previously, Azerbaijan urged Iran to cease its "broadcasting and unauthorized transmission of Iranian Sahar-2 television into Azerbaijan" and "criticized the Azeri-language broadcasts beamed into southern Azerbaijan for containing "anti-Azerbaijani propaganda" aimed at destabilizing the southern regions of the country", and faulted the "Iranian government" for "interference in Azerbaijan's internal affairs". Iranian officials have claimed that the broadcasts are beyond their control, as Sahar-2 is a privately owned station and merely expresses "its own position" in its programs.

=== Israeli anti-Iran listening posts in Azerbaijan ===
In a Washington Institute for Near East Policy analysis, analysts Soner Cagaptay and Alexander Murinson alluded to reports that Israeli intelligence maintains listening posts along the Azerbaijani border with Iran.

=== Bilateral tension with Iran ===
On the 12th of April 2007, Azerbaijan handed Hadi Sid Javad Musavi, an Iranian citizen affiliated with the Southern Azerbaijan National Awakening Movement, to the Iranian authorities.

In October 2007, according to Human Rights Watch, an eight-and-a-half-year prison sentence was handed down to Eynulla Fatullayev, editor of Azerbaijan's two largest independent newspapers, for terrorism and other charges. The terrorism and inciting ethnic hatred charges derive from an article Fatullayev wrote in Realni Azerbaijan, in which he argued that the government's support of the United States’ position on Iran makes Azerbaijan vulnerable to attack from Iran, and he speculated on likely targets of such an attack.

In December 2007, Court consideration on the cases of Novruzeli Mammadov, Azerbaijan National Academy of Sciences Linguistics department chief, editor-in-chief of Tolishi sado newspaper and linguist Elman Guliyev, official of was started in the Court of Grave Crimes. The two were accused of receiving 1000 US dollars from Talish organizations in Iran after their newspaper published articles showing Persian poet Nizami and Iranian historical hero Babak Khoramdin as Talysh. Also in another incident in December 2007, the Court for Grave Crimes on sentenced 15 members of so-called Said group and its alleged leader, Said Dadashbeyli to lengthy prison sentences convicting them of treason and passing information on Israeli, U.S., and British activities in Azerbaijan Republic to Iranian intelligence. The Iranian government summoned the Azeri ambassador to Tehran to protest the claims and called them "baseless" accusations.

Azerbaijan's reel of Eurovision Song Contest 2009 depicted the Maqbaratoshoara, a famous monument and a symbol of the Iranian city of Tabriz and the northwest region of Iran, shown among Azerbaijani national monuments. This has been perceived by many Iranians as a violation of Iranian territorial integrity and as an evidence that Azerbaijan Republic has claims on Iranian territory.

On 11 November 2009, Iran unilaterally lifted its visa regime for Azerbaijani citizens.

Azerbaijan's president Aliyev has stated that he supports the U.S. sanctions against Iran. In a meeting with U.S. officials in Baku in February 2010 Aliyev expressed his support and also criticized European oil and gas companies for sabotaging the international sanctions regime. This information came out in one of the released diplomatic cables of the United States diplomatic cables leak in November 2010.

According to STRATFOR Iran has politically and financially supported the Islamic Party of Azerbaijan (AIP), a pro-Iranian and religious Shiite opposition party officially banned by Baku. The leader of the AIP, Movsum Samadov, has called for the overthrow of the Azerbaijani government.

=== Hezbollah's activities in Azerbaijan ===
Despite Azerbaijan being a majority Shi'a country, decades of conflict with Iran has also led a huge legacy of this tension, and it is also expanded to other Iran-backed groups' attitude toward Azerbaijan, notably Hezbollah, a Lebanese Shi'a militant group. Hezbollah members had been arrested in 2009 following a failed attempt by Hezbollah members to blow up the Israeli embassy in Baku, Azerbaijan.

=== Iran-Azerbaijan visa free regime ===
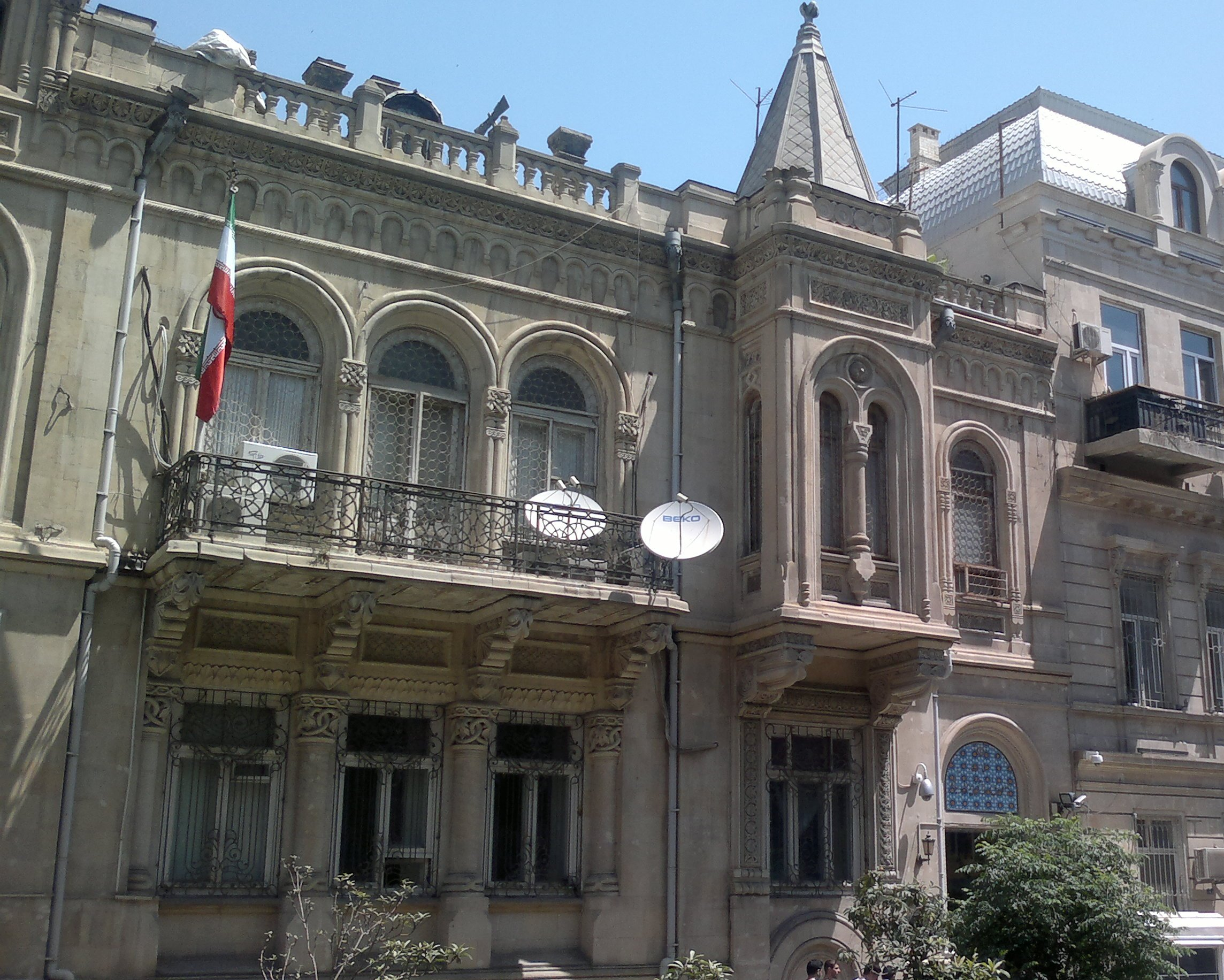
Building of the Iranian embassy in Baku

Azerbaijan agreed to a visa free regime with Turkey while Iran also demanded a visa free regime with Azerbaijan. Iran had threatened to cut off the critical supply line between Azerbaijan and the Nakhchivan Autonomous Republic if Azerbaijan lifts the visa requirements for the Turks, but does not extend the same privilege to Iranian citizens.

=== Deterioration of relations in 2012 ===
In 2012, three men were detained by the Azerbaijan Ministry of National Security for planning to attack Israelis employed by a Jewish school in Baku. Security officials in Baku linked Iran to the planned terror operation. The men allegedly received smuggled arms and equipment from Iranian agents, possibly in retaliation to the assassination of Iranian nuclear scientists. Wafa Guluzade, a political commentator close to the Azerbaijani President Ilham Aliyev, warned Iran that "planning the murder of prominent foreign citizens in Azerbaijan by a band of terrorists, one of whom [Dadashov] resides in Iran, amounts to 'hostile activity' against our country."

Iranian-Azeri relations deteriorated further after the Azeri Communication Minister, Ali Abbasov accused Iran of carrying out cyber attacks against the country.

In March 2012 Azerbaijan arrested 22 people on suspicion of plotting attacks on the U.S. and Israeli embassies in Baku on behalf of neighboring Iran. The ministry said that the suspects were recruited from 1999 onwards and trained in the use of weapons and spy techniques at military camps in Iran to enable them to gather information on foreign embassies, organizations and companies in Azerbaijan and stage attacks. All 22 were found guilty and given jail terms of at least a decade.

Azerbaijani Foreign Minister Elmar Mammadyarov has denied reports that Israel has been given permission to use Azerbaijan bases for an attack on Iran. Top Israeli security officials blamed the leak of the plan on Obama administration officials who were trying to prevent the strike on Iran. The plan apparently involves using an Israeli tanker aircraft painted in the colors of a third country airline company that would land and refuel in Azerbaijan and then refuel the Israeli strike aircraft.

Iranian officials objected to Azerbaijan hosting the Eurovision Song Contest 2012, claiming that Azerbaijan was going to host "a homosexual parade". Ali Hasanov, head of the public and political issues department in Azeribaijani President's administration, said that gay parade claims were untrue, and advised Iran not to meddle in Azerbaijan's internal affairs. In response, Iran recalled its ambassador from Baku, while Azerbaijan demanded a formal apology from Iran for its statements in connection with Baku's hosting of the Eurovision song contest, and later also recalled its ambassador from Iran.

=== Improvement of relations in 2014–2016 ===
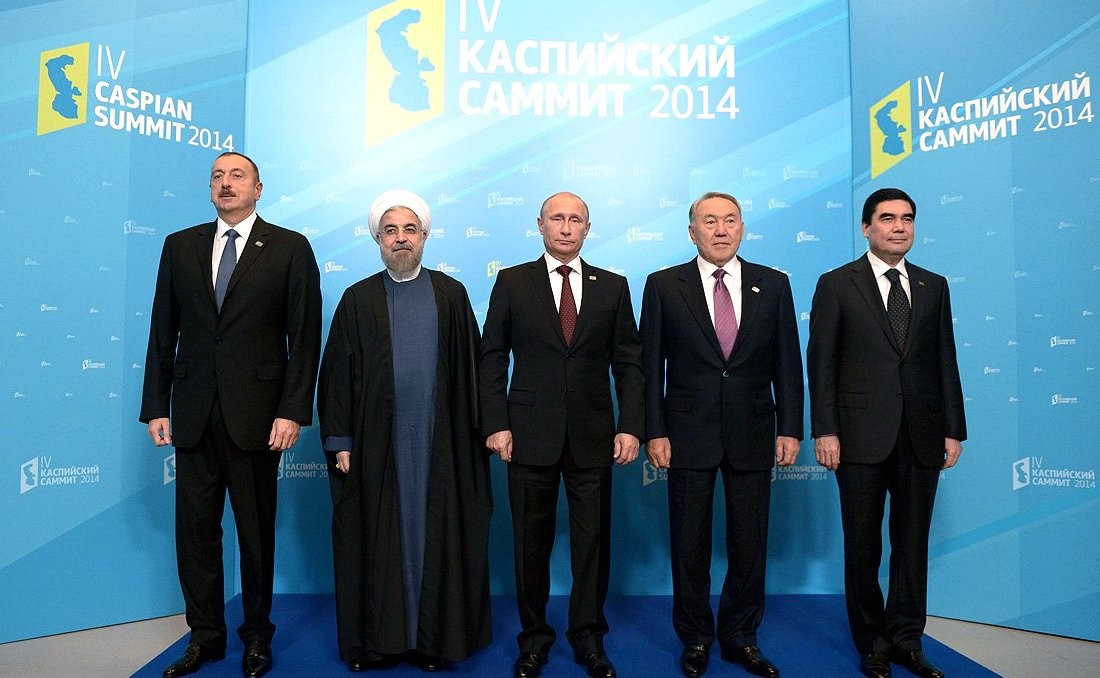
Presidents of Azerbaijan and Iran, Aliyev and Rouhani, seen here at the 4th Caspian Sea Summit in 2014.

With the advent of Hassan Rouhani as president of Iran in late 2013, relations between the two neighbouring countries have gradually but significantly improved.

In December 2014, Iran announced it would launch a bus service between the cities of Ardabil and Baku. The Iranian spokesman of the Ardabil provincial department of Transport and Terminals called launching the service a necessity, saying every year over 600,000 passengers visit Ardabil from the Azerbaijan Republic and Iranian provinces.

In April 2015, Iran and Azerbaijan announced their decision to form a joint defense commission; a move that may indicate a conspicuous geopolitical shift in the South Caucasus. In May 2015, deputy chief of foreign relations at the Secretariat of the Supreme Leader of Iran's Islamic Revolution Mohsen Qomi has expressed his country's readiness to support Azerbaijan. He told chairman of Azerbaijan's State Committee for Work with Religious Organizations Mubariz Gurbanli who visited Tehran, "We are ready to support Azerbaijan at any time".

Mr Qomi described Azerbaijan as "a friendly and fraternal" country for Iran. He said Iran's Supreme Leader attaches great importance to expanding relationship with Muslim countries, especially Azerbaijan. In May 2015, the two countries also discussed the prospects for cooperation between Azerbaijan and Iran in the petrochemical sector. The two nations also have planned to expand their cooperation in tourism. The sides are expected to sign a document on tourism cooperation, the Iranian tourism organization reported. Several more treaties and accords related to the expansion of cultural, economical, strategical, and cooperations on joint defense were signed as of 2015, or were announced to be signed in the near future.

Speaking about relations with Iran in May 2015, President Ilham Aliyev said the Iranian-Azerbaijani friendship is unbreakable and no extraneous force can split it.

Aliyev further states that:

"These relations have risen to a new level in recent months," (...) "Regular contacts, mutual visits of high-ranking officials, the support rendered to each other in international organizations clearly shows the high level of our political relations," (...) "An intergovernmental joint commission actively works, producing excellent results," Aliyev said. "There are tremendous opportunities in the field of oil and gas, electric power engineering, and gas exchange. Several projects have been already implemented. New projects are expected to be implemented."

Iran has also announced several times that it might join the TANAP project which will carry Azerbaijani gas to Turkey, statements which Azerbaijan has supported.

In May 2015, the Ambassador of Iran to Azerbaijan announced that it doesn't recognize the self-proclaimed "Nagorno-Karabakh Republic". He further stated that: "There is no country called Nagorno-Karabakh Republic, and the Islamic Republic of Iran does not recognize such "a country". Of course, we don't recognize the "elections held there".

Nearly one million Azerbaijani tourists visit Iran every year, a number which is continuing to increase steadily. Iran has abolished its visa regime for the neighboring Republic of Azerbaijan since 2010, and increased the number of visa free days from 15 to 30 days as of November 2015. Regarding Azerbaijan–Iran relations, President Aliyev stated that: "Our relations are being built on this solid basis and today, the Iranian-Azerbaijan relations have grown into the strategic cooperation and have never been in a such high level."

=== Since 2016: return of tensions and confrontation ===
Shortly after president Trump announced the United States recognition of Jerusalem as the capital of Israel and ordered the planning of the relocation of the U.S. Embassy in Israel from Tel Aviv to Jerusalem, Azerbaijan voiced its recognition of Israel's position in Jerusalem, which had a negative impact on Azeri–Iranian relations. Furthermore, in spite of Iran's action not recognizing Artsakh, Azerbaijan was accused for continuing to sponsor pan-Turkist separatists within the country.

Iran was accused of waging a steady irregular warfare campaign against Baku using an ethnic Azerbaijani proxy known as the Islamic Resistance Movement of Azerbaijan that was created in 2015. Since then, the Azerbaijani government has accused the Hussainiyoun of having been behind multiple assassination attempts against Azerbaijani officials, including the mayor of Ganja, Elmar Valiyev, and outspoken anti-Iranian parliamentarian Fazil Mustafa.

In 2018, Azerbaijan suspended oil and gas trade with Iran in support to the United States' reintroduced sanctions on Iran, which prompted hostility on the part of Iran's government towards Azerbaijan.

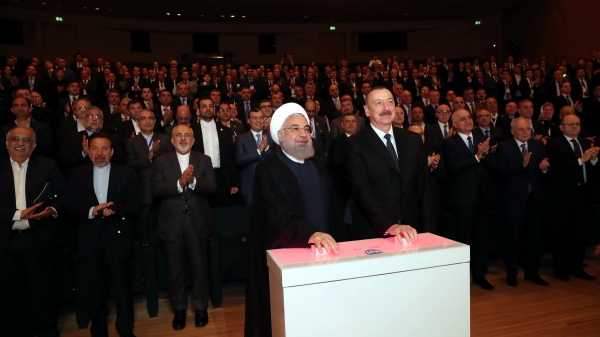
President Rouhani and his Azeri counterpart Aliyev at the inauguration of the Khazar Car Factory and Astara railway in Baku on March 29, 2018

In March 2018, Iranian President Hassan Rouhani and Azerbaijani President Ilham Aliyev attended the opening of the Khazar joint car manufacturing factory in Neftçala, Azerbaijan. Two sedan models designed by Iran Khodro namely Dena and Dena+ are being manufactured at the plant. The plant has an annual production capacity of 10,000 units. There are plans to raise output to 15,000 units and also undertake exports to neighbouring countries such as the Russian Federation. The move was seen as an attempt to reduce tensions between the two countries.

In 2019, Azerbaijan sent a delegation to participate on the February 2019 Warsaw Conference. The conference accused Iran of financing terrorist activities in the region. This event further strained the once-already tensions between both countries.

In April 2020, Iran was accused of supplying fuel to Armenian-held Nagorno-Karabakh, provoking sharp reaction from Azerbaijan, with Baku summoning Iranian diplomats and accusing Tehran of exacerbating the conflict over the territory. The Iranian foreign ministry denied the allegations, calling them "utterly false" and blamed unnamed provocateurs. The Armenian authorities in Nagorno-Karabakh declined to confirm the presence of Iranian fuel trucks in the area, and stated that "(...) there are no official relations between our countries. As for business ties between private companies, we believe that they should not be a matter for political speculations." Eurasianet's own assessment: "In general, Iran has not taken sides in the conflict and seeks to maintain good relations with both Armenia and Azerbaijan. It’s not clear that the Iranian government would even necessarily know if private Iranian fuel trucks were traveling to Karabakh, which can only be entered via Armenia". Although most Azerbaijani news outlets repeated the diplomatic narrative of the Azerbaijani foreign ministry, some Azerbaijani news websites who are allowed a bit more leeway worked themselves into deep resentment, such as minval.az, which named the episode as "the beginning of a ‘reset’ of relations with Iran" in which Azerbaijan would be gaining the upper hand. Website Haqqin "unloaded with a lengthy recounting of Iran’s many sins against Azerbaijan over the past 30 years".

During the July 2020 Armenian–Azerbaijani clashes, Azerbaijan and Armenia were called on by Iran to show restraint. When hostility resumed between Azerbaijan and Armenia in the Second Nagorno-Karabakh War, Azerbaijani media outlets accused Iran of tacit support for Armenia, while Iran denied these accusations and stated its act to make peace in Karabakh. Iran also reaffirmed its support for the "territorial integrity" of Azerbaijan. According to TRT, a Turkish state-run media outlet, despite Iran's rhetoric supportive claims for Azerbaijan, Iran was actually believed to be secretly backing Armenia, as Iran is concerned over the threat from uprisings by its Azerbaijani minority, and Iran might have sought for intervention if Azerbaijan gained upper hand.

On 21 September 2021, Iran began military drills near the Azerbaijani districts of Fizuli, Jebrayil and Zangilan, which Azerbaijan had taken control of during the Second Nagorno-Karabakh War, marking the first time in history that Tehran conducted military exercises along its border with Azerbaijan. On 1 October, Iran launched the second phase of the exercises, codenamed Fatehan-e Khaybar ("Conquerors of Khaybar"), the moniker referring to the 628 Battle of Khaybar, in which Muslim fighters defeated a Jewish force. Iranian general Kioumars Heydari explained the meaning of the war games by citing "the overt and covert presence of the Zionist regime’s proxies and the possibility of a significant number of Daesh terrorists in regional countries." This was condemned by Azerbaijan as a provocative act, damaging the already uneasy relations between Azerbaijan and Iran. The reasons of the crisis was attributed to: Azerbaijani media blaming Iran for tacitly backing Armenia in the 2020 Karabakh War, which Iran denied; Azerbaijani restriction and detention of two Iranian truck drivers, in fear of Iranian trucks providing weapons for Armenia; and finally Israeli presence in Azerbaijan near Iranian borders. Shortly after the unannounced military drill by Iran, Azerbaijan, along with its ally Turkey, planned for an upcoming military exercise as a response to Iran.

On 27 January 2023 a gunman attacked the Azerbaijani embassy in Tehran. The head of security staff was killed and two others were injured. In response, the government of Azerbaijan evacuated staff from the country's embassy in Iran and reportedly suspended all diplomatic operations at the facility.

=== Diplomatic thaw from 2023 onwards ===
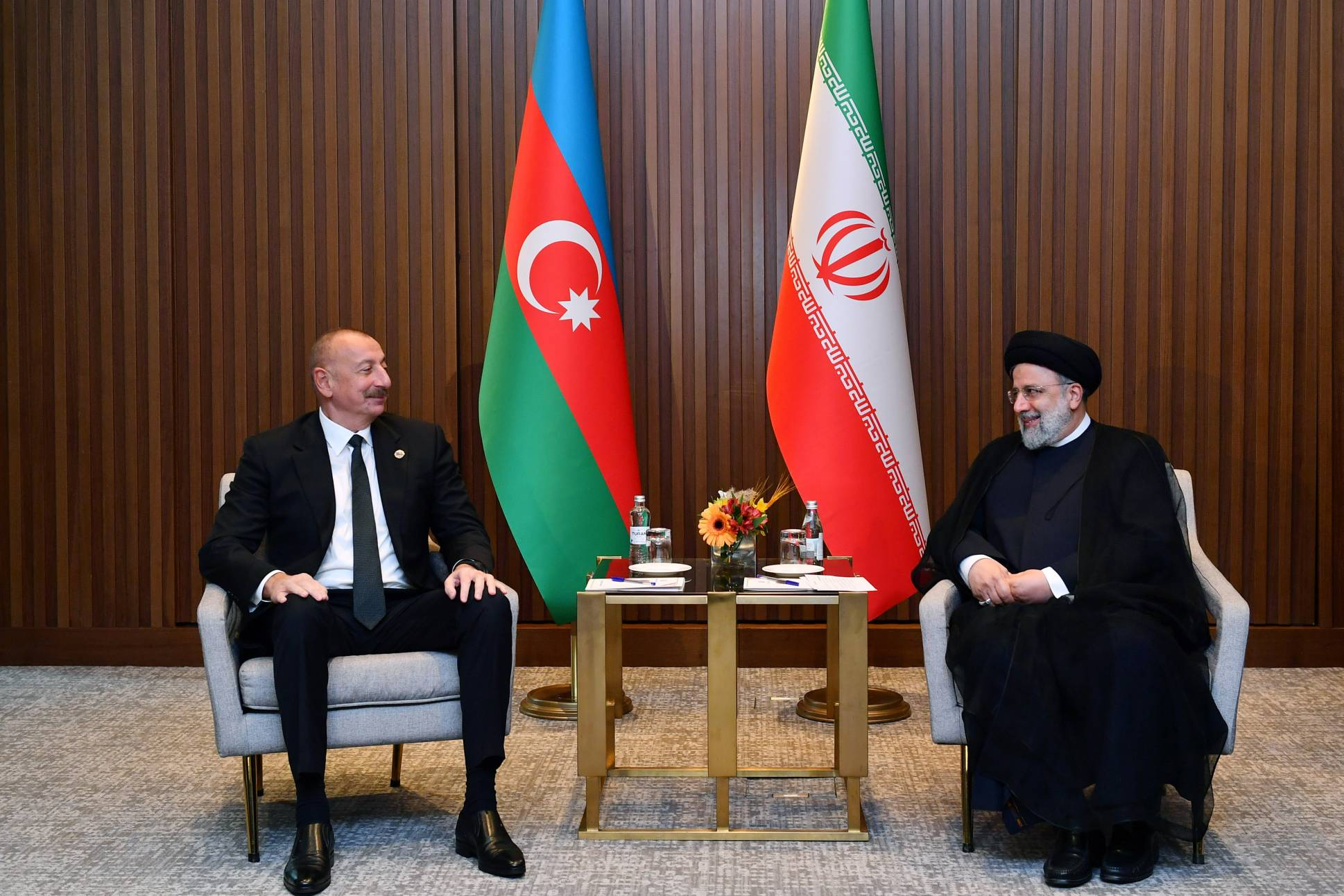
Azerbaijani President Ilham Aliyev with Iranian President Ebrahim Raisi

In July 2023, Iranian Foreign Minister Hossein Amir-Abdollahian hailed growing relations between the two countries during a meeting with President Aliyev. Since then, relations between the two countries have improved substantially.

In October 2023, Azerbaijan stated it would discuss the issue of a land corridor to the Nakhchivan Autonomous Republic with Iran. Iranian prosecutors have also sought the death penalty for the perpetrator of the attack on the Azerbaijani Embassy.

Iranian president Raisi and foreign minister Amir-Abdollahian were killed in the 2024 Varzaqan helicopter crash after a state visit to Azerbaijan.

On 11 February 2025, Aliyev ratified a 2024 agreement to expand the North-South corridor, modernizing road and rail links between Iran, Azerbaijan, and Russia. 7 days later a plan was finalized to build the Rasht-Astara railway in Iran, announced at the 3rd Caspian Forum. Azerbaijani Prime Minister Ali Asadov expressed commitment to funding the North-South and East-West trade projects.

On 23 May 2026, Ramil Rza oglu Imranov, an Azerbaijani diplomat serving official duties in Iran, was killed in a car accident on the Julfa-Tabriz highway. A career diplomat who had worked for the Ministry of Foreign Affairs of Azerbaijan since 2000, Imranov held the post of consul to the Consulate General of the Republic of Azerbaijan in Tabriz. Prior to his appointment to Iran in 2024, Imranov had served as a counselor at the Azerbaijani Embassy in Saudi Arabia.

=== 2026 Iran conflict ===
On 4 March 2026, after the assassination of Ali Khamenei, president Ilham Aliyev visited the Iranian embassy in Baku to reiterate condolences after previously offering them to Iranian president Masoud Pezeshkian. Despite this, four Iranian drones were flown into Azerbaijan the following day. The drones struck in the Nakhchivan exclave, injuring four civilians. The Azerbaijani government condemned the incident as a terrorist attack, with Aliyev instructing the military to "prepare and implement response measures", declaring "We will not tolerate this unprovoked act of terror and aggression against Azerbaijan". The Iranian envoy was summoned, and Azerbaijan recalled its diplomats from Iran on 6 March. That same day, Azerbaijan announced it managed to foil an Iranian linked terror and sabotage group, that was planning to execute attacks on critical infrastructure and prominent figures in Azerbaijan. The group of 4 men also conducted intelligence-gathering activities orchestrated by Iran’s Islamic Revolutionary Guard Corps (IRGC). According to The Caspian Post among the targets it had in sight were the Baku-Tbilisi-Ceyhan oil pipeline, the Israeli Embassy in Baku, a leader of the Mountain Jewish community, and an synagogue.

== Economic relations ==
=== Imports and exports ===
Imports of Azerbaijan
Year	Amount Thousands of USD
2020	300 615,39
2021	397 523,54 ▲
2022	476 438,40 ▲
2023	473 087,35 ▼
2024	633 058,13 ▲
2025	624 071,61 ▼

Exports of Azerbaijan
Year	Amount Thousands of USD
2020	38 485,71
2021	43 287,15 ▲
2022	29 831,05 ▼
2023	14 307,39 ▼
2024	14 008,29 ▼
2025	20 025,52 ▲

== Resident diplomatic missions ==
- Azerbaijan has an embassy in Tehran and consulate-general in Tabriz.
- Iran has an embassy in Baku and consulate-general in Nakhchivan.

== See also ==
- Armenia–Iran relations
- Azerbaijan–Iran border
- Azerbaijan–Turkey relations
- Iran–Turkey relations
- Iranian Azerbaijanis
