= Ganja case (2018) =

- Date: July 2018 – 2019
- Location: Ganja, Azerbaijan
- Caused by: Attempt on mayor's life, public grievances over corruption and local governance
- Methods: Protests, police operations, mass arrests
- Status: Ongoing legal appeals; ECtHR applications pending
- Result: Dozens of arrests and convictions; international criticism over alleged torture and unfair trials

Parties
Government of Azerbaijan	Protesters and defendants

Casualties and losses
2 police officers killed (10 July 2018)	Several protesters injured (reports vary)

Casualties
- Detained: Over 70 detainees

The Ganja case (2018) or Ganja events of 2018 (Azerbaijani: Gəncə iğtişaşları (2018)) refers to mass arrests and prosecutions that followed an assassination attempt of the mayor of Ganja, Elmar Valiyev, which caused unrest in the city of Ganja, Azerbaijan, in July 2018.

A local man by the name of Yunis Safarov, shot and wounded the mayor of the city on 3 July 2018 and a week later, protesters in the city clashed with police, during which two police officers were killed. In the aftermath, Azerbaijani authorities arrested dozens of people and brought multiple criminal charges against them for organizing the violence. Human-rights organisations have expressed concerns over torture and mistreatment allegations related to the case and an application has been filed with ECtHR.

== Background ==
The authorities classified the shooting by Safarov as a premeditated "terror act" alleging he received military training abroad and intended "to cause chaos and panic in the republic and forcibly seize power."

Safarov reportedly stated that he attacked the mayor because of grievances and complaints about alleged abuses and misconduct that had been repeatedly ignored. After his arrest, rallies and protests took place under slogans criticizing the mayor's leadership and calling out "official impunity."

Following the failed assassination of the mayor and the protests that ensued, prosecutors charged a large number of suspects with offences including organising mass disorder, possession of weapons and other serious crimes, while identifying the crowd as "supporters of a radical religious movement seeking to incite riots". Safarov was sentenced to life imprisonment. In the period from 2018 to 2019 the courts in Azerbaijan convicted and gave lengthy prison sentences to several of the defendants.

== Allegations of torture and unfair trial ==
Several human-rights groups, defence lawyers and international NGOs documented allegations of torture of detainees and that some trials failed to meet international fair-trial standards. The International Partnership for Human Rights (IPHR) published a detailed report describing arbitrary arrests, forced confessions and inadequate access to lawyers.

The European Human Rights Advocacy Centre (EHRAC) submitted an application to the European Court of Human Rights (ECtHR) on behalf of five people, alleging torture, denial of medical care, and the use of forced confessions during their trials. Independent human-rights monitors also reported widespread allegations of ill-treatment of detainees and other violations in the investigation and trials related to this case.

Azerbaijani authorities have rejected claims that the prosecutions were politically motivated and maintain that the arrests and convictions were lawful responses to violent events. Domestic courts reportedly refused to investigate torture allegations.

== Reactions ==
Several international and domestic human-rights organisations expressed concerns about the treatment of detainees. Human Rights Watch, Amensty International, Freedom House, Institute for War & Peace Reporting (IWPR) documented systemic patterns of arbitrary detention, torture, and forced confessions in Azerbaijan, noting that concerns in the Ganja case were consistent with broader problems in the country’s criminal-justice system.

The US Department of State 2020 country report also mentions credible allegations of torture, arbitrary detentions and forced confessions, and notes that human-rights defender Oktay Gulaliyev, who publicly defended some of the detainees in the Ganja case, had a car accident in 2019 and remained in a coma under circumstances that raised concerns of a possible reprisal.

Relatives of those convicted held protests in Baku in 2019, alleging torture and unfair trials and calling for independent investigations.

== See also ==
- Nardaran case
- Human rights in Azerbaijan
