= Ogtay Gulaliyev =

Azerbaijani human rights activist

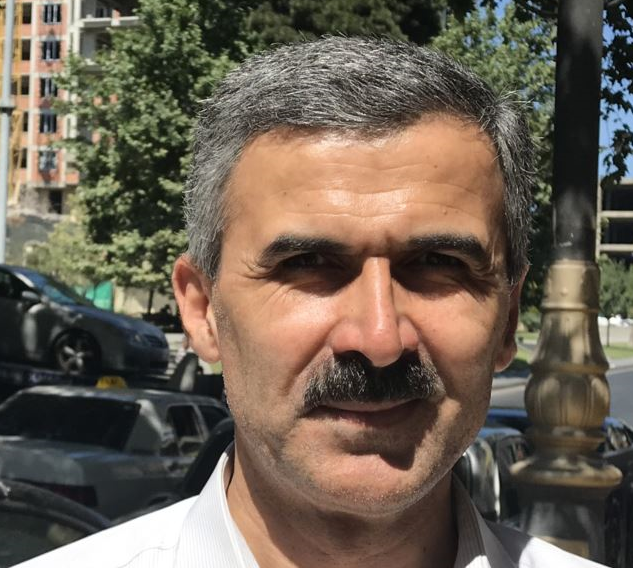
- Born: June 27, 1970 (age 55)
- Died: Baku, Azerbaijan SSR, USSR
- Occupation: human rights activist
- Organization: Kur Civic Society
- Known for: 2012 imprisonment

Ogtay Gulaliyev (Azerbaijani: Oktay Gülaliyev; born June 27, 1970) is an Azerbaijani human rights activist. His organization, Kur Civic Society, provides assistance for people affected by environmental disasters.

Oqtay Gulaliyev was born in 1975 in Baku, Azerbaijan, USSR. In 1998 he graduated from the Academy of State Service under the Presidential Administration, worked as lawyer. In 2010 he went into human rights protection activity when he came into contact with flood-hit residents of Sabirabad region. In 2010 Gulaliyev headed headquarters of civil society «Kura» that dealt with human rights protection of flood- hit population on rivers Kura and Arax in May–June 2010.

In April 2012, he was arrested during a meeting in Sabirabad Rayon. Initially charged with "swearing in a public place", the charges were later upgraded to "active resistance to authorities' legal orders" and "incitement to mass riots and to violence against citizens". Gulaliyev later stated that while in custody, he was beaten by police officers. On 2 May, a prison doctor recommended surgery for a problem with Gulaliyev's intestines; when Gulaliyev requested that his personal doctor be allowed to be present, prison officials refused permission for the surgery.

In 2013, Gulaliyev took on leadership of the press-center of opposition candidate from the National Council of Democratic Forces, Jamil Hasanli.

The Parliamentary Assembly of the Council of Europe called his case "arbitrary detention and judicial harassment". The International Federation for Human Rights and World Organisation Against Torture began a letter-writing campaign on his behalf, calling on authorities to immediately release Gulaliyev and impartially investigate his allegations of torture. Front Line Defenders also condemned the charges against him. Amnesty International designated him a prisoner of conscience, "targeted in response to his work as a human rights defender". Human Rights Watch dismissed the charges against him as "spurious".

Gulaliyev was released on 13 June 2012. In June 2016 Ogtay was banned from leaving the country. He reported this to the Institute for Reporters’ Freedom and Safety and that he was told he was wanted by Sabirabad Regional Police.

Ogtay Gyulalyev was the first to expose the Terter case of mass torture and continued to investigate and expose it, despite the threats he received. He also publicly defended some of the detainees in the Ganja events of 2018. On October 29, 2019 when Ogtay Gulaliyev was crossing a street after anti- torture campaign press-conference he was hit by a car. The human rights protection activist had skull fracture and brain injury. After he was brought to the hospital, he did not receive medical assistance for 17 hours and fell into coma. His family later tried to file a lawsuit against the doctors treating Gyulalyev for "negligence", but the Azerbaijani prosecutor's office repeatedly refused to open a criminal case against the doctors, hence the family had to file a claim against the actions of the prosecutor's office, which was subsequently dismissed by the court of appeals.

On recommendation of Turkish physicians, on November 6 Gulaliyev was taken to the Istanbul clinic. The Heydar Aliyev Fund undertook to pay for Gulaliyev's treatment.
