= Tartar Case =

Large scale torture in Azerbaijan

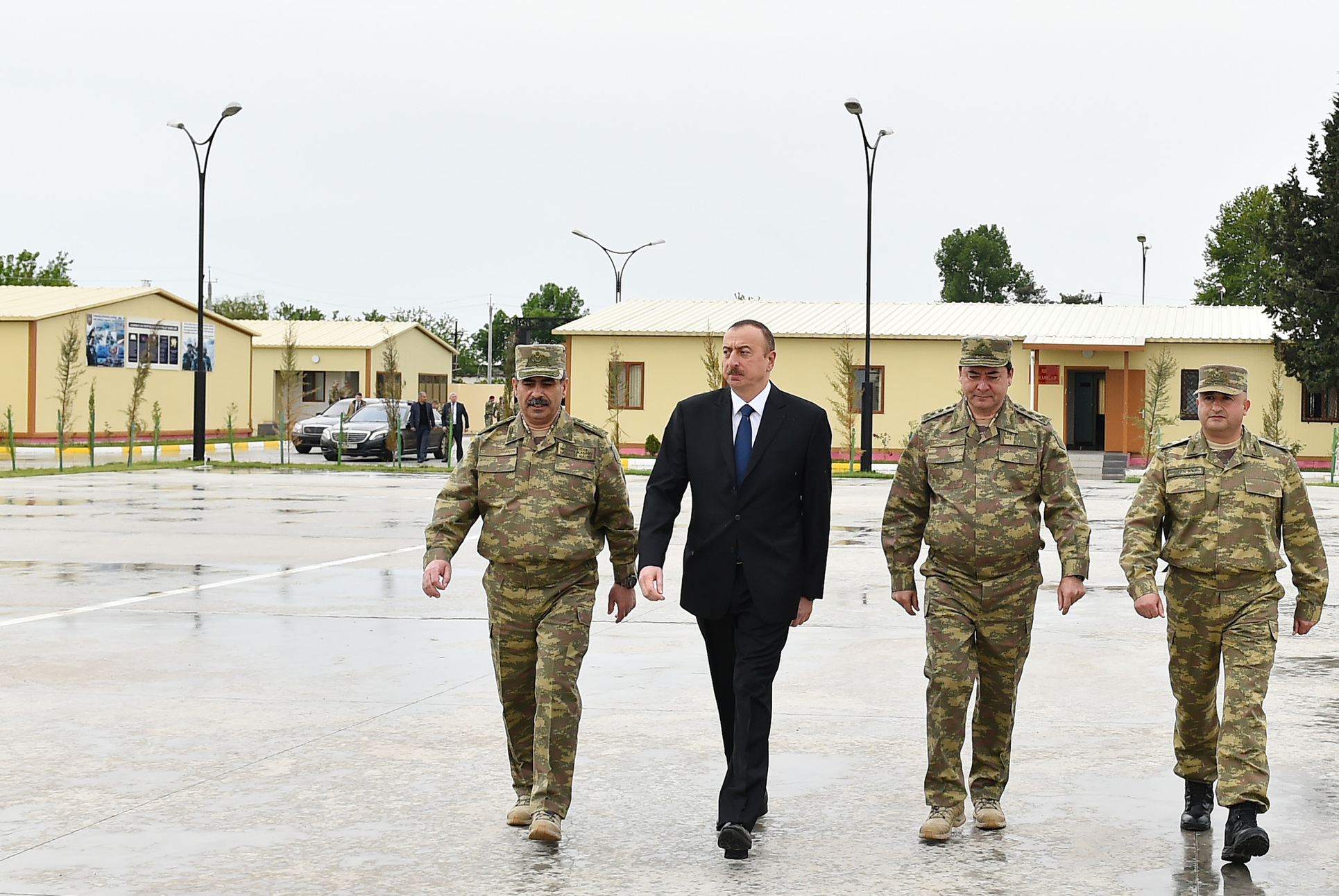
Ilham Aliyev visiting a military unit in Tartar district in 2016

The Tartar Case (Azerbaijani: Tərtər işi, also known as the Terter Case) is a case of large scale torture that took place in Azerbaijan, dealing with Azerbaijani military personnel accused of treason in 2017 in the aftermath of the Nagorno-Karabakh war in April 2016. According to the authorities and human rights defenders, more than 400 people were subjected to torture in the course of the case. The Azerbaijani authorities claim one person was killed as a result, while human rights defenders say the number is about 13, and many were wrongfully convicted and given hefty prison sentences.

After 4 years of total denial of any wrongdoing by the government, in 2021 Azerbaijani authorities started investigating the case. Several trials were held and some of the perpetrators received various prison terms. However there has not yet been a complex investigation of the entire case. It has been described as the largest case of mass torture in Azerbaijan's post-soviet history.

The case got its name after the Tartar district, where servicemen were taken and tortured during interrogations.

== Background ==
In May 2017 in the aftermath of renewed clashes in Nagorno-Karabakh several Azerbaijani law enforcement bodies released a statement claiming that “a group of military officers and civilians of weak will betrayed the nation, the homeland and the state, lost the spirit of citizenship and devotion to the motherland and engaged in secret cooperation with enemy intelligence by repeatedly giving them information of military secrecy for the sake of their financial interests.” The statement also claimed that some took part in: "sabotage and terrorist activities, which were planned to be carried out by the intelligence and special services of the enemy in public places in Baku".

The statement was followed by massive arrests of military personnel in Azerbaijan. They were taken to the old administrative building in the Tartar district of Azerbaijan, interrogated and forced to confess to espionage for Armenia. None of the accused, however were convicted on specific charges for preparation, assistance or planning of any terrorist or other acts in Baku.

According to human rights defenders, at least 11 soldiers died as a result. Based on testimonies of the victims and their relatives, people were stripped naked, thrown out of windows, beaten with sticks, had their nails pulled out, subjected to electroshock and other form of extreme torture and humiliation. At least 25 people pleaded guilty to espionage and received harsh prison sentences.

The courts overlooked the fact that the testimonies were obtained under duress and issued sentences ranging from 12 years in prison to life imprisonment, based on confessions obtained under torture.

== Secrecy and subsequent exposure of the case ==
For four years, the government maintained complete secrecy about the case as it was classified as a State secret and there was no coverage about it in pro-state media outlets. However information began to leak as reports of widespread torture started circulating on social media. Detainees who were tortured and then released, along with families of the victims were also speaking out reiterating that all the accusations were completely false.

In 2019, in the city of Barda, relatives held a protest rally in front of a military unit of the Ministry of Defence of Azerbaijan, wearing shirts with portraits of their killed and arrested relatives, demanding rehabilitation for the deceased and release from prison for the people in jail. One of the human rights defenders involved in the case, Oktay Gulaliev, was hit by a car in the centre of Baku. After he was brought to the hospital. Oktay did not receive medical assistance for 17 hours and as a result remained in a coma.

At the end of 2019, the BBC published an expose about the case by reaching out to several people whose loved ones had been affected. These were the wives of soldiers who died from torture; as well as the parents of those who - allegedly under torture - incriminated themselves and received lengthy sentences on charges of treason.

In June 2021 a group of PACE deputies launched an initiative to appoint a special rapporteur to investigate the use of torture in Azerbaijan. In April 2021 the OMCT also condemned the Azerbaijani government and law enforcement of human rights violations, demanding to conduct inquiries into the torture cases and subsequent deaths and all the other allegations of torture and cruel treatment.

In November 2021, the Public Prosecutor General admitted at a press conference for the first time that mass torture did take place. He added that the case was deliberately inflated by "people with an Armenian essence", and in a "completely unreasonable way" they were trying to attract undue attention to it. In response to reactions in social media following his statement, the prosecutor described attention to the case as "ungrounded noise".

Several months later the case started getting more coverage also by local Azerbaijani media. In an interview given to BBC in June 2021, human rights activists Leyla Yunus, explained the attention to the case in local media by the internal political struggle in security forces, suggesting that President Ilham Aliyev may use the case to replace one of the groups among the security forces.

Ilham Aslanoglu Tahmazov, a human rights activist who was one of the first ones publicising the Tartar case was arrested in June 2022 after his interview on the AzerFreedom YouTube channel about mass torture. He was sentenced to six months in prison for “insult”. The Azerbaijan Human Rights Institute for Reporters’ Freedom and Safety called on Azerbaijani authorities to immediately release him while Azerbaijani political analyst Orujlu lamented that: "A month and a half has passed since the reopening of the criminal proceedings. However, no one has yet been arrested, although the perpetrators are known. On the contrary, the person who was the first to expose these crimes has been arrested."

== Investigations ==
In 2019 a group of 12 officers (a fraction of the number believed to be involved) were arrested, convicted and sentences from 3 to 3,5 years in prison, one being sentenced to 10 years. But that did not stop the victims, their families and their advocates from writing letters, holding protests and giving more interviews and demanding a proper and complete investigation.

In November 2021, the military prosecutor of Azerbaijan, Khanlar Veliyev, admitted for the first time at a press conference that mass torture took place in the Tartar case, while clarifying that it had taken place before the intervention of his department. He stated that only one person had died, and this also had happened before the prosecutor's office found out about it. He assured that authorities had started investigations, criminal cases had been initiated and perpetrators would be brought to justice. In total, according to him, there were 102-103 victims.

In December 2021, a joint statement by the Prosecutor General's Office, the Ministry of Internal Affairs and the State Security Service of Azerbaijan was released. It said that a new preliminary investigation of mass tortures had been launched and Elchin Mammadov, First Deputy Prosecutor General of the country took the preliminary investigation into the case of torture under his "special watch".

In 5 September 2022 the General Prosecutor of Azerbaijan revealed that 288 new victims in connection with the Tartar case were identified and interrogated on the circumstances of the case, which raised the total number of victims to 405 identified victims of the case.

On 6 October 2022, the Prosecutor General's Office of Azerbaijan reported that 19 victims of the case were released and 10 of them were acquitted, while the remaining cases were terminated with no acquittal.

The victims, their relatives and the human rights defenders have expressed dissatisfaction with small terms for those guilty of torture. They continue to demand a full investigation and express scepticism of the possibility of a complete and fair investigation.

== List of people who died under torture ==
According to human rights defenders 13 people are known to have died as a result of torture.

number	name	rank	date of arrest	date of death
1.	Saleh Şərif oğlu Qafarov	Lieutenant colonel	4 May 2017	13 May 2017
2.	Süleyman Kazımov	Captain	4 May 2017	
3.	Adil Sabirli	First lieutenant		5 May 2017
4.	Təmkin Nizami oğlu	Lieutenant	12 May 2017	
5.	Ruslan Ocaqverdiyev			15 June 2017
6.	Elxan Ağazadə	Junior sergeant	1 May 2017	10 May 2017
7.	Elçin Əhmədov		3 May 2017	6 May 2017
8.	Dayandur Əzizli		12 May 2017	
9.	Elçin Quliyev		11 may 2017	
10.	Elçin Mirzəliyev		7 May 2017	
11.	Mehman Hüseynov		1 May 2017	8 May 2017
12.	Səxavət İlyas oğlu Binnətov		7 May 2017	
13.	Rasim Heydər oğlu Rzayev	Colonel	4 May 2017	24 December 2020

== See also ==
- Human rights in Azerbaijan
- Nardaran case
