= Yunis Safarov =

Azerbaijani Islamist

- Yunus Səfərov
- Occupations: Dissident, Militant Shia Islamist
- Organization: Islamic Resistance Movement of Azerbaijan
- Known for: Attempted assassination of Elmar Valiyev

Yunis Safarov (Note: Azerbaijani: Yunus Səfərov) is an Azerbaijani political dissident and member of the Shia Islamist militant group called the Islamic Resistance Movement of Azerbaijan, a group which gained infamy after Ganja events of 2018, when he attempted to assassinate Elmar Valiyev, the leader of the executive authority of the city of Ganja.

== Biography ==
Yunis Safarov was born to Azerbaijani parents. His father is a businessman based in Russia.

He traveled to Iran around 2016 and lived in the city of Qom for eight months, and reportedly received military training in Syria, where he joined the ranks of the Azerbaijan Islamic Resistance Movement

During the Syrian Civil War, he is said to have fought alongside Iranian forces and the regime of Bashar al-Assad with several members of the Islamic Resistance Movement of Azerbaijan against the forces of the Salafist jihadist terrorist group ISIS.

Safarov is said to have participated in the Battle of Palmyra against ISIS forces.

In 2018, he shot the head of Ganja's executive authority and was convicted. Safarov's motivation is said to be the "struggle against oppression" and the "harassment of the local population". He was sentenced to life imprisonment. According to the indictment, Yunis Safarov and 11 others were charged with 30 counts, including attempted murder, terrorism and illegal possession of weapons

In 2018, while in prison, Sarafov was reportedly denied forensic examination for 21 days after alleged mistreatment by guards. The photos of the abuse circulated on social media soon after his arrest.

Some Azerbaijani newspapers have accused Iran and Armenia of planning the attack.

Safarov became an icon of part of the Azerbaijani opposition to Ilham Aliyev's regime.
