= Islamic Resistance Movement of Azerbaijan =

Shia Islamist group in Azerbaijan

- Azərbaycan İslam Müqavimət Hərəkatı
- Founder: Tawhid Ibrahim Begli
- Leader: Tawhid Ibrahim Begli
- Dates active: 2015–present
- Allegiance: Iran; IRGC
- Headquarters: Qom and Mashhad
- Active regions: Ba'athist Syria (Until 2024)
- Ideology: Shia Islamism; Khomeinism; Anti-Zionism; Anti-Western sentiment
- Political position: Syncretic
- Status: Active
- Part of: Axis of Resistance; Islamic Revolutionary Guard Corps

The Islamic Resistance Movement of Azerbaijan, (Note: Azerbaijani: Azərbaycan İslam Müqavimət Hərəkatı) also known as Husseiniyoun, (Note: Azerbaijani: Hüseynçilər, حسین‌چی‌لر) is a Shia Islamist Azerbaijani militant organization that is based in Iran.

== History ==
Tawhid Ibrahim Begli is known as the founder of this movement. He is a staunch critic of the regime of Ilham Aliyev and stated that the aim of the movement is "to create a discourse, to create a deterrent power among the Shia Muslims of Azerbaijan and to strengthen and empower them based on the model of resistance".

In late 2015 and early 2016, Tawhid Ibrahim Begli instructed 14 students from Azerbaijan who were studying religion in Qom and Mashhad to establish a "Husseiniyoun Brigade" consisting of students. Ibrahim Begli first gathered the 14 students at the workplace of Iskander Husseinov in Qom, and after a day of waiting, transferred them to a military unit near the capital of Syria, Damascus. All of the newly-recruited fighters had received brief basic military training before their deployment to Syria.

The movement was named by Qasem Soleimani.

On February 14, 2026, Iraqi militias telegram channels declared that Husseiniyoun had threatened to take action against US and Israeli interests in Azerbaijan.

== Role in Syria ==
The IRMA has only had a minimal presence and made a minimal impact in Syria due to its small size, especially when compared to bigger and stronger militias such as Lebanese Hezbollah, the Popular Mobilization Forces, Fatemiyoun, and Zainabiyoun.

When it comes to armed strength, the group had gained battlefield experience from its fighting in Syria. Members of the group had also received military training from Hezbollah on capabilities such as guerrilla warfare and unconventional warfare tactics. Furthermore, as the Syrian conflict began die down and the forces of Assad Regime became less dependent on Iranian-backed militias for support, a number of the IRMA's veterans, who had fought in the Syrian civil war, began to returning to their homes in Azerbaijan and also Iran. In Iran, some of those who had returned, continued training for the event of a future conflict or crisis.

Some members of the movement had volunteered at their own choice to participate in the 2020 Nagorno-Karabakh War and the 2023 Azerbaijani offensive in Nagorno-Karabakh in favour of Azerbaijan.

=== Role in 2024 Syria clashes ===
Reports indicated little to no resistance or support from Husseiniyoun in any engagements in Syria leading up to and during the 2024 Syrian opposition offensives and the Fall of the Assad regime.

== Stances on the Azerbaijani government ==
According to some media outlets in the Republic of Azerbaijan, Ibrahim Begli immediately stated in Damascus that their intention was not only to fight ISIS, but also to prepare for an uprising in Azerbaijan.

However, the movement has stated that its sole purpose is to confront extremists and has no plans to expand its activities in Azerbaijan. According to Tawhid Ibrahim Begli, he did not support Azerbaijan and did not directly order the deployment fighters to Nagorno-Karabakh because of Israel’s support for Azerbaijan. Some members of the group volunteered themselves to fight for Azerbaijan in the conflict, despite no specific orders on them to do so.

== Ties with Iran ==
Tawhid Ibrahim Begli's father, Alam Ibrahimli, and his mother, Soodabeh Ibrahimli, originally from Lankaran, later settled in Mashhad.

In 2013, Tawhid Ibrahim Begli met with Ali Khamenei, the supreme leader of Iran, during a meeting called "Ulema of the Ummah and the Islamic Awakening" as the chairman of the "Assembly of Fighting Clerics of the Republic of Azerbaijan". During the meeting, he spoke about the situation of Muslim prisoners in the Republic of Azerbaijan.

In 2017, Tawhid Ibrahim Begli attended the "Memorial of the Martyrs of Nardaran" in Zanjan and spoke about the incident of an attack by the special police forces of the Azerbaijani Ministry of Internal Affairs in 2015 on the Shiites of Nardaran, which killed four residents.

The movement visited the tomb of Qasem Soleimani in Kerman in 2020.

In a message, the Islamic Resistance Movement of Azerbaijan congratulated Ebrahim Raisi on his victory in the 2021 Iranian presidential election.

Hussainiyoun’s leader is currently reported to be residing in Iran.

== Crackdown and arrests of members ==
The members of this group who were fighting in Syria were mostly imprisoned or faced severe treatment by the government of Azerbaijan after returning.

Azerbaijani law enforcement agencies released information that Tawhid Ibrahim Begli, leader of the organization, who regularly made threats against Azerbaijan, called for the assassination of Elmar Valiyev, the then mayor of Ganja, in January 2017 through the extremist website "nur-az.com". A year later, Yunis Safarov attempted to assassinate Elmar Valiyev.

Tawhid Ibrahim Begli has been accused of continuous and radical efforts against the government of Azerbaijan and was previously detained by the police during a protest rally in front of the Israeli embassy in Baku and was detained for 7 days by a court decision.

In 2020, the residence of Faleq Valiyev, a member of the movement, was identified in Russia, and he was arrested as part of an international search and was extradited to Azerbaijan on August 27. He was charged with "being a member of a criminal group (organization)", "training outside the Republic of Azerbaijan for terrorist purposes" and "participating in the activities of armed groups outside the laws of the Republic of Azerbaijan". He was sentenced to eight years in prison by the Ganja Crimes Court.

"Elmir Zahedov", a high-ranking member of the organization who was present in Syria, was imprisoned in Shaki prison in 2021.

== Flag ==
The flag of the Islamic Resistance Movement of Azerbaijan has a yellow background, with their logo in green, featuring a globe with the map of Azerbaijan inside of it, as well as a hand holding a Dragunov sniper rifle. Above the logo it features Verse 39 from Sūrah Al-Hajj, saying "Permission to fight back is hereby granted to those being oppressed, for they have been wronged. And Allah is truly the Most Capable of helping them prevail" (أُذِنَ لِلَّذِينَ يُقَاتَلُونَ بِأَنَّهُمْ ظُلِمُوا ۚ وَإِنَّ اللَّهَ عَلَىٰ نَصْرِهِمْ لَقَدِيرٌ). Under the logo it features the Coat of Arms of Azerbaijan, and under the coat of arms it says "Hüseynçilər", meaning "Followers of Hussein" in the Azeri language. At the bottom, "Islamic Resistance Movement of Azerbaijan" is written in Azeri, as well as its Arabic translation under it.

Like the IRGC, its branches and proxies, Hezbollah, Harakat Al-Sabireen, Liwa Zainebiyoun, Liwa Fatemiyoun, and many other Shia militias allied to Iran, the flag of this group features a hand holding a rifle.
