= Elmar Valiyev =

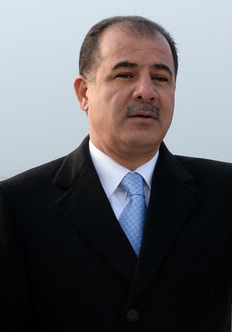
Elmar Valiyev

Elmar Valiyev (Note: Azerbaijani: Elmar Vəliyev) (born 3 October 1960) is the former mayor of Ganja, Azerbaijan. Born in Evlakh, Azerbaijan, he graduated from the Azerbaijan Technical University as a mechanical engineer, and later from Azerbaijan State Academy.

== Early life ==
Valiyev was born on 3 October 1960 in Yevlakh, which was then part of the Azerbaijani SSR in the Soviet Union. In 1978, he graduated from his secondary school with good grades, and then entered the Azerbaijan Technical University.

== Career ==
On February 18, 2011, Veliyev was appointed mayor of Ganja. He was previously Head of the Yevlakh City Executive, during which time Avaz Zeynallı and Vugar Gurdganli were arrested for libelling Valiyev. He held the post from 26 March 2004 to 18 February 2011.

=== Assassination attempt and dismissal ===
On July 3, 2018, Valiyev was seriously wounded in an assassination attempt. It was the first assassination attempt on a government official in Azerbaijan in 25 years. During the investigation of his assassination attempt, it was found out that Tawhid Ibrahim Begli, leader of the Islamic Resistance Movement of Azerbaijan, called for his assassination. Valiyev had a controversial reputation in Ganga for seizing citizens' homes and demolishing them to create new buildings. Ali Hasanov, an adviser to the President, stated that foreign media had been working to create an Islamophobic and anti-Shiite image of Valiyev, which led to the attack. Following the attempted assassination, protests broke out over the event, during which two police officers and 40 protestors were detained. He was relieved of his duties by President Ilham Aliyev in August 2018.

In March 2019, fourteen people were tried over the attempt, which was closed to the public.

== Awards and honours ==
On 27 November 2017 he was awarded the For Service to the Fatherland Order in II degree for "active participation in the socio-political life of the Republic of Azerbaijan."
